= Fatality statistics in the Western Australian mining industry =

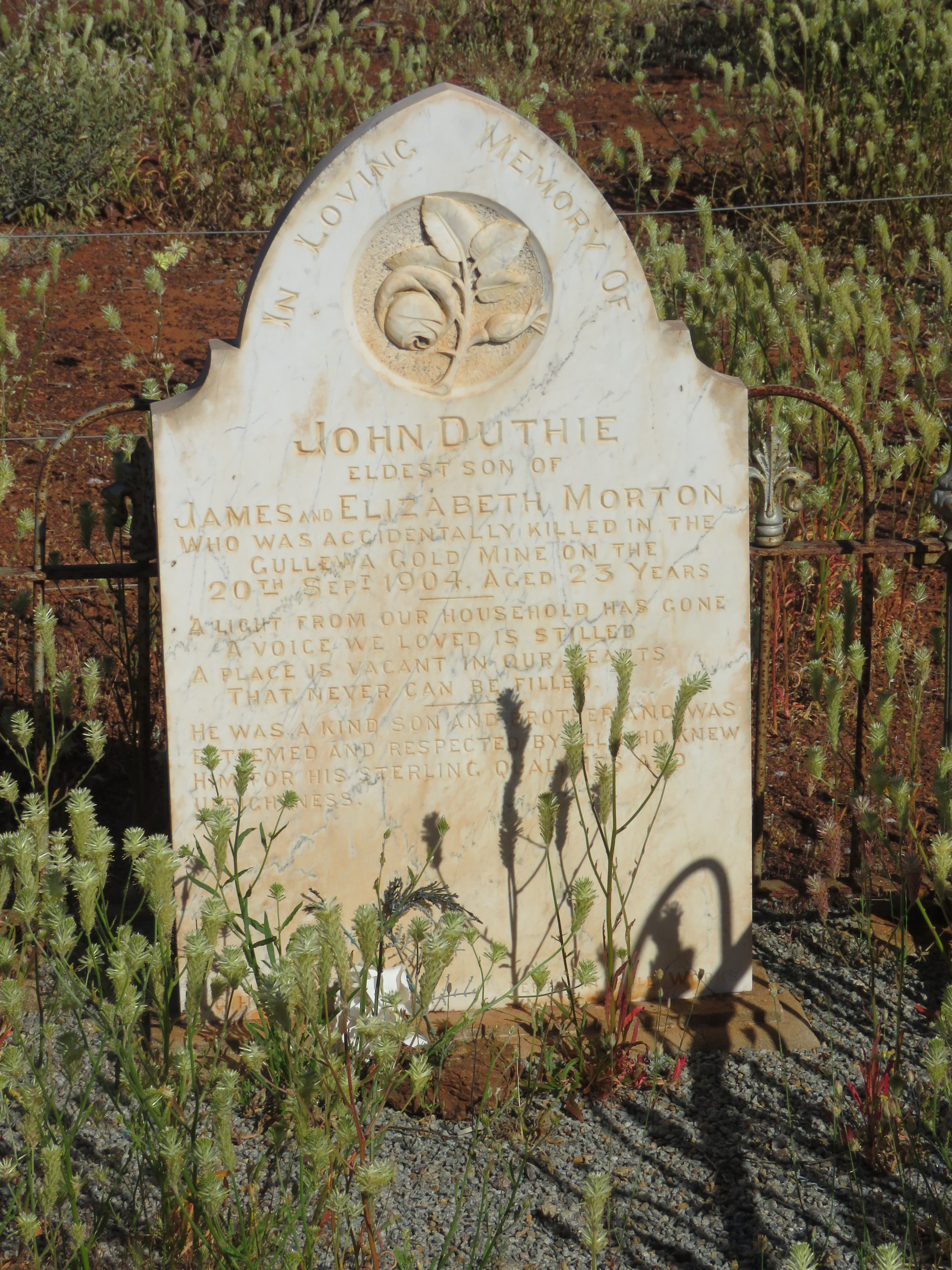
- Grave of John Duthie, killed in a mining accident at the Gullewa Gold Mine in 1904

Location
- State: Western Australia
- Country: Australia

Regulatory authority
- Authority: Department of Mines, Industry Regulation & Safety
- Website: www.dmp.wa.gov.au

Fatality statistics in the Western Australian mining industry captures the number of people killed in the industry in the Australian state of Western Australia. During the period 2000-2012 (inclusive), a total of 52 fatalities occurred. In 2006, the Chamber of Minerals and Energy of Western Australia commissioned a taxonomic study to analyse the 306 mining fatalities which occurred between 1970 and 2006. The Department of Mines & Petroleum, later renamed the Department of Mines, Industry Regulation & Safety, the governing authority for the industry in the state, has published statistics for fatalities in mining dating back to 1943 and intends to publish statistics dating back to 1886, though early records are not expected to be exhaustive.

== Categorisation ==
The department lists the fatality statistics categorised by commodity, date, fiscal year, occupation, causes, report status and type of mining (underground or surface). Records up until 1967 are not categorised by commodity and instead appear as "not categorised" in the listing. Categorisation began in 1967 and almost all fatalities are categorised after 1968.

=== Omissions ===
The statistics do not include the 2000 Australia Beechcraft King Air crash, when a flight to the Gwalia Gold Mine, with seven Sons of Gwalia employees onboard failed to land, instead continuing on to Burketown, where it eventually crashed, having run out of fuel. The pilot and the plane's seven passengers were all killed.

== Recent fatalities ==
The most recent fatalities in the Western Australian mining industry are:

- 8 April 2026: a 38 year old man died after a vehicle in which he was a passenger rolled over on an access road at the King of the Hills Gold Mine.
- 21 August 2025: Kyle Stanley (32), a mechanical fitter died while working on a bogged truck at the Wiluna West iron ore operation in the Goldfields. He had worked for Premium Mechanical Group.
- 6 December 2024: Peter Groves (29), a drilling contractor died at a remote mineral exploration site in the state. He had worked for Challenge Drilling as a contractor on the Apollo Hill Gold Project.
- 23 April 2024: Eli Kelly (21) died from crush injuries sustained in a tailings paste plant at Gold Fields' St Ives Gold Mine, near Kambalda.
- 12 June 2023: Kieren McDowall (20), an employee of AAA Asphalt Surfaces, was killed at Mineral Resources Ken's Bore site of its Onslow Iron project.
- 7 February 2023: Jody Byrne (51) was killed at BHP's Boodarie rail yard, near Port Hedland, having been struck by a locomotive.
- 13 October 2022: Gary Mitchell (59), a machine operator at Capricorn Metals' Karlawinda Gold Mine, was killed when his vehicle was crushed by a large dump truck.
- 11 October 2022: Airleg miner Terry Hogan (37) was killed by a rock fall near a vent rise in Gold Fields' Hamlet underground mine at St Ives, near Kambalda.
- 30 September 2021: David Armstrong (25), a shotfirer, was killed in a ground collapse during open pit mine blasting operations at Fortescue's Solomon iron ore hub.
- 17 September 2021: Scaffolder Eugene Tata (52) fell to his death from a conveyor walkway at CITIC Pacific Mining's Cape Preston project.
- 10 June 2021: Paul Tamati Ereka Martin (36) died after becoming unconscious through heat exhaustion in Silver Lake Resources' Daisy Milano Gold Mine at Mount Monger.
- 9 December 2020: Paige Counsell (25), underground truck driver, was struck by a haul truck in the decline of the Big Bell Gold Mine, but died while being transported to a Perth hospital by the Royal Flying Doctor Service.
- 13 July 2020: Michael Johnson (38), bogger operator at Saracen Minerals' Dervish underground mine at Carosue Dam, died when his machine fell 25 metres down an open stope.
- 7 January 2020: Howard Prosser (64), died from injuries sustained in the accident at the Roy Hill iron ore mine.
- 18 September 2019: Ricky Hanson (57), a truck driver, received fatal head injuries on 11 September while operating the trailer covering system on the second trailer of a road train at Independence Group's Nova nickel-copper mine, 160 km east of Norseman.
- 20 June 2019: Andrew Herd (44), haul truck driver, was killed at the Red Hill granite quarry, operated by Hanson Australia, near Perth, when his truck fell from the haul road into the pit.
- 15 August 2018: Daniel Patterson (28), haul truck driver, was killed at Rio Tinto's Channar mine near Paraburdoo when his truck veered off the road.
- 26 April 2018: Neville Bentley (42), a face shovel operator, was crushed between the excavator's ladder and handrail at Griffin Coal’s Ewington coal mine, Collie.
- 27 February 2018: Glenn Morton (34), an engineering surveyor, suffered an allergic reaction to a bee sting at Iluka Resources' Cataby mineral sands mine and subsequently died on 12 March 2018.
- 14 October 2017: Steve Fogarty (49), a Rio Tinto Exploration field technician, died at Mount Windell, near Karijini National Park, from dehydration and renal failure, while conducting reconnaissance mapping.
- 4 July 2017: David John Keen (51), a drill and blast crew worker, was fatally injured at Rio Tinto's Yandicoogina mine due to a non-work related explosives detonation inside a light vehicle.
- 26 July 2016: Lindsay Bridges (60), a boilermaker, working at the Central Norseman gold mine plant inside a thickener tank during a shutdown, was crushed when a corroded gantry above him failed and collapsed.
- 20 June 2016: Lee Buzzard (32), a fitter, died while performing maintenance on a drilling rig at Rio's Channar mine, near Paraburdoo.
- 16 November 2015: Adam Perttula (28), jumbo drilling offsider, collapsed underground in hot conditions at the Paulsens Gold Mine, south of Pannawonica, and died the next day.
- 7 September 2015: Hira Rewita (56) killed when his haul truck rolled over at Cornishman gold mine, Southern Cross.
- 15 May 2015: Joshua Martin (24) crushed between the charge up basket and the roof of a cross-cut, at Telfer gold mine.
- 11 May 2015: Adam Hardaker (46), an underground bogger operator, was struck by a rock falling from a rill during bogging operations at Aditya Birla Minerals’ Nifty Copper Mine.
- 20 January 2015: Philip Kitching (62) was fatally crushed during maintenance work on a bulldozer at Palmary Enterprises' Woodie Woodie manganese mine.
- 26 May 2014: Lance Farber (63) killed operating a forklift at Mikado Mine, Laverton.
- 15 February 2014: Wayne Fowlie (59) killed by a rock fall in the Harlequin Mine, Norseman.
- 29 December 2013: Allen Zuvella (33) was killed in the heavy vehicle workshop at Fortescue's Christmas Creek mine. The second fatality at the mine in four months.
- 4 December 2013: Stephen Hampton (43), a contractor at the Newcrest owned Telfer mine was killed while working on the tailings dam.
- 14 August 2013: Kurt Williams (26), an electrician at Foerescue's Christmas Creek mine was killed when he sustained fatal crush injuries in the crushing plant.
- 16 August 2011: Brent Glew (27) was killed at Rio Tinto's Brockman 2 mine, being crushed by a hydraulic cylinder of a front-end loader.
- 24 December 2010: Paul Torre (39), killed while carrying out maintenance on a haul truck, at the Cloud Break mine in the Pilbara, an iron ore mine operated by Fortescue.
- 5 August 2010: Rene Ponce (60), miner at the Norseman Gold Mine in the Eastern Goldfields fell while removing ladders in an escape rise.
- 11 April 2010: Wayne Lance Ross (45), an underground loader operator at the Perseverance nickel mine at Leinster, operated by BHP, drove into an open stope void and fell 25 metres.
- 6 August 2009: Daniel Owen Williams (26), bogger operator, died after falling 25m onto broken rock in an ore pass at Barrick's underground Kanowna Belle Gold Mine.
- 30 May 2009: A 34-year old workshop fitter died when a bulldozer belly plate fell on him during maintenance work at CITIC Pacific Mining's Sino iron project at Cape Preston.
- 7 January 2009: Karen Mitchell (54), haul truck driver, died from injuries after falling 3.1 metres to the ground while cleaning the windscreen of her truck, at KCGM's Fimiston Open Pit.
- 25 August 2008: Paul Sparkes (29), was fatally injured while assembling and inflating a heavy earth mover tyre at BHP's Yandi iron ore mine.
- 4 September 2008: Apprentice Adam Sargeant (19), was killed when his light vehicle was crushed by a haul truck at BHP's Yandi iron ore mine.
- 24 June 2008: A 61-year old haul truck driver was fatally injured in a collision with a bulldozer at Mercator Gold's Bluebird Gold Mine near Meekatharra.
- 11 January 2008: Nigel Taylor, a 26-year old rigger died after he became jammed between the boom lift he was operating and the steel structure he was working on at Fortescue Metals' Cloud Break iron ore mine.

== Multiple fatalities ==
Multiple fatalities in the Western Australian mining industry are very rare nowadays and none have occurred since June 2000. Here a list of all multiple fatalities in the industry since 1939:

- 2000, 26 June: Three men died as a result of the failure of a sandfill bulkhead at Normandy Mining's Bronzewing Gold Mine, located in the North Eastern Goldfields.
- 1997, 1 September: Two men died from a rockfall in a stope at Western Mining's Victor Decline underground nickel mine, Kambalda.
- 1990, 7 February: Two men, a mining engineer and the managing director of a contracting company, died when a concrete block fell down the raise in the Edwards Find underground gold mine, near Marvel Loch.
- 1989, 13 June: Six men died when a decline at Western Mining's underground Emu Mine, now the Agnew Gold Mine, flooded after heavy rain.
- 1985, 11 December: Two men died in a stope of BP's Perseverance underground nickel mine, Leinster, due to lack of oxygen.
- 1978, 9 June: Two men asphyxiated by nitrogen gas while cleaning a cobalt converter vessel at Western Mining's Kwinana Nickel Refinery.
- 1977, 14 July: Two men died when struck by a Hamersley Iron ore train while doing track maintenance.
- 1977, 27 April: Five men died when a kibble fell down the Agnew No. 1 shaft of Seltrust-MIM's Perseverance underground nickel mine, Leinster, due to a winder malfunction.
- 1975, 28 May: Two men were killed by a rock fall in Poseidon's Windarra underground nickel mine.
- 1974, 13 August: Two men died in a head-on collision of two in an iron ore mine.
- 1960, 12 October: Two men were killed in an underground explosives accident at Ravensthorpe Copper Mines' Elverdton Shaft.
- 1960, 24 August: Two men were killed when they fell from the winder cage in Lake View and Star's Horseshoe No. 2 Shaft, Boulder.
- 1954, 18 November 1954: Two men were killed in an explosion in a magazine at White Rock Quarries, Gosnells.
- 1953, 5 January: Two men died when they were buried by a ground fall in the Baddera Lead Mine, near Northampton.
- 1952, 19 September: Two men died when they were buried by a slime dump at the Ivanhoe gold mine, Boulder.
- 1951, 30 November: Two diamond drillers were killed on the 2,650 ft level of the Hamilton shaft of the Great Boulder mine when they drilled into a pocket of gas that exploded.
- 1951, 5 October: Two men were killed in an explosives accident on the 1600 ft level of the Associated shaft, Lake View and Star mine, Boulder.
- 1951, 1 June: Three men were crushed when a trolley fell to the bottom of the main shaft where they were working, in the Sons of Gwalia underground mine, Leonora.
- 1950, 10 March: Two timbermen were struck by a descending counterweight and fell down the shaft of Asarco's Big Bell mine.
- 1950, 13 January: Two men were killed by the air blast from a massive rock fall falling down the shaft of the Big Bell mine.
- 1946, 1 March: Three men were killed in an underground rock fall at the Hill 50 gold mine, Mt Magnet.
- 1946, 23 January: Two men were killed in a blast at the Ora Banda Amalgamated gold mine, Ora Banda.
- 1943, 17 July: Three men died of suffocation underground, two of them while attempting to rescue the third, at the Great Boulder gold mine, Boulder.
- 1940, 19 March: Two miners were crushed by a fall of earth in a stope of the Hannans Star shaft, Boulder.
- 1939, 22 February: Three miners were overcome by fumes in a winze at the Maybell gold mine, Norseman.

== Fatalities statistics ==
These are the statistics of fatalities by year, type of mining and commodity, subdivided into decades:

=== 2021 to 2030 ===
Fatalities in the current decade, as of December 2024:

Year	GD	IO	NI	BM	CL	DI	DS	SM	UM	All
2021	1	2	–	–	–	–	–	1	2	3
2022	2	–	–	–	–	–	–	1	1	2
2023	–	2	–	–	–	–	–	2	–	2
2024	2	–	–	–	–	–	–	2	–	2
2021–2030	5	4	–	–	–	–	–	6	3	9

=== 2011 to 2020 ===
Fatalities in the decade 2011 - 2020:

Year	GD	IO	NI	BM	CL	OT	SM	UM	All
2011	–	3	–	–	–	–	3	–	3
2012	–	–	–	–	–	–	–	–	0
2013	1	2	–	–	–	–	3	–	3
2014	1	–	–	–	–	–	–	1	1
2015	3	–	–	2	–	–	2	3	5
2016	–	1	–	–	–	–	1	–	1
2017	–	1	–	–	–	1	2	–	2
2018	–	1	–	–	1	1	3	–	3
2019	–	–	1	–	–	1	2	–	2
2020	1	2	–	–	–	–	1	2	3
2011–2020	6	10	1	2	1	3	17	6	23

=== 2001 to 2010 ===
Fatalities in the decade 2001 - 2010:

Year	GD	IO	NI	BM	BA	DI	DS	SM	UM	All
2001	–	1	3	–	–	–	2	6	–	6
2002	1	–	1	–	–	–	–	1	1	2
2003	2	1	–	–	1	1	–	4	1	5
2004	2	3	–	–	–	–	–	3	2	5
2005	2	1	1	–	–	–	–	2	2	4
2006	1	–	2	–	–	–	–	1	2	3
2007	2	1	1	–	–	–	–	2	2	4
2008	1	3	–	–	–	–	–	4	–	4
2009	2	3	–	1	–	–	–	5	1	6
2010	1	1	1	–	–	–	–	1	2	3
2001–2010	14	14	9	1	1	1	2	29	13	42

- Only the commodities with fatalities during this decade are listed.

=== 1943 to present ===
Fatalities by decade:

Year	GD	IO	NI	BM	BA	CY	CL	CM	DI	DS	MS	SA	TT	OT	NC ^{‡}	All
1943–1950	–	–	–	–	–	–	–	–	–	–	–	–	–	–	107	107
1951–1960	–	–	–	–	–	–	–	–	–	–	–	–	–	–	142	142
1961–1970	12	12	6	1	1	1	1	–	–	–	–	–	–	3	55	92
1971–1980	15	44	31	–	4	–	1	6	–	–	5	3	–	4	1	114
1981–1990	44	8	19	–	4	–	1	1	1	–	2	–	4	4	1	89
1991–2000	42	8	10	1	2	–	2	1	1	1	1	1	–	–	1	71
2001–2010	14	14	9	1	1	–	–	–	1	2	–	–	–	–	–	42
2011–2020	6	10	1	2	–	–	1	–	–	–	–	–	–	3	–	23
2021–2030	5	4	–	–	–	–	–	–	–	–	–	–	–	–	–	9
1943–2020	138	100	76	5	12	1	6	8	3	3	8	4	4	14	307	689

- ^{‡} Up until the late 1960s, all fatalities are listed under "not categorised" in the DMP database.

=== Key ===
- GD: Gold
- IO: Iron ore
- NI: Nickel
- BM: Base metals
- BA: Bauxite and Alumina
- CY: Clay
- CL: Coal
- CM: Construction materials
- DI: Diamonds
- DS: Dimension stone
- MS: Mineral sands
- SA: Salt
- TT: Tin, Tantalum and Lithium
- OT: Other
- NC: Not categorised
- SM: Surface mining
- UM: Underground mining
- All: Overall

=== Museum of the Goldfields ===
The Kalgoorlie branch of the Western Australian Museum, known as the Museum of the Goldfields, hosts a series of panels that name every mining fatality in the Kalgoorlie area since establishment of the mines.
