= Nickel mining in Western Australia =

Mining activity in Western Australia

- Position of Western Australia within Australia highlighted

Location
- State: Western Australia
- Country: Australia

Regulatory authority
- Authority: Department of Mines, Industry Regulation and Safety
- Website: http://www.dmp.wa.gov.au/index.aspx

Production
- Commodity: Nickel
- Production: ▲160,371 tonnes
- Value: ▲$5.743 billion
- Employees: ▲9,839 (FTE)^{[1]}
- Year: 2022–23

Nickel mining in Western Australia has been an industry that has had many fluctuations of fortune in its history. Large fluctuations in the world nickel price have seen mines close and reopen on several occasions.

Nickel mining is the sixth largest commodity sector in Western Australia with a value of $4.946 billion in 2021–22. The 147,190 tonnes sold during this time period accounted for 5.5 percent of the world's Nickel production and 100 percent of all nickel produced in Australia. The 2021–22 value of nickel sales was the highest in 15 years while the amount produced was the lowest in 20 years.

From 1997 to 2022, Western Australia was the only state or territory in Australia to produce nickel. With the restart of nickel concentrate production at the Avebury nickel project in Tasmania in October 2022, this status changed.

Australia (predominantly Western Australia) holds one-third of the world's known reserves of nickel-producing laterites and sulfide deposits. As of 2011, Australia was the world's fifth largest nickel producer. The only other significant Australian nickel production outside Western Australia is a refinery at Yabulu, Queensland which processes ore from New Caledonia, Indonesia and the Philippines.

Cobalt is produced as a by-product in Western Australia nickel mines, producing 5,314 tonnes at a value of $522 million was produced in 2021–22.

== Early mines ==
Major nickel mining locations in Western Australia with Perth as a reference. Red dots indicate mines, green dots indicate process facilities.

The first Nickel mines in Western Australia were developed in the late 1960s in Kambalda, Laverton and the Kimberley region of Western Australia.

The price of nickel peaked at about £7,000 per pound in late 1969, driven by demand from the Vietnam War and the major Canadian producer, Inco (now Vale Canada), being embroiled in industrial action, creating a supply shortage. In November 1969, a prospector working for Poseidon NL made a promising nickel discovery at Mount Windara near Laverton. The discovery created a spectacular investment bubble when its shares moved from $0.50 to $280 in February 1970.

During the early 1970s, an exploration boom fueled by speculators followed, with new companies searching for new deposits. Western Mining Corporation (WMC) purchased Poseidon and developed the find into a major mining and processing operation which continued until 1989. WMC had initially identified a total resource of 8.5 million tonnes of ore @ 2.02% Ni for 172,000 tonnes of nickel metal. The first shipment of nickel concentrate was made in 1974, but by this time the nickel price had fallen significantly. By 1990 the company had mined 5 million tonnes of ore at an average grade of 1.59% Ni and had produced 80,000 tonnes of the metal. Operations at Windara re-commenced several times during the 1990s. Several of the Kambalda mines have since been sold and the remainder are known the Windarra Nickel Mine which, as of 2012 is under care and maintenance.

WMC was taken over by BHP and the company was delisted from the Australian Securities Exchange in 2005.

The 1971 movie Nickel Queen reflected upon the Poseidon bubble.

== Nickel West ==
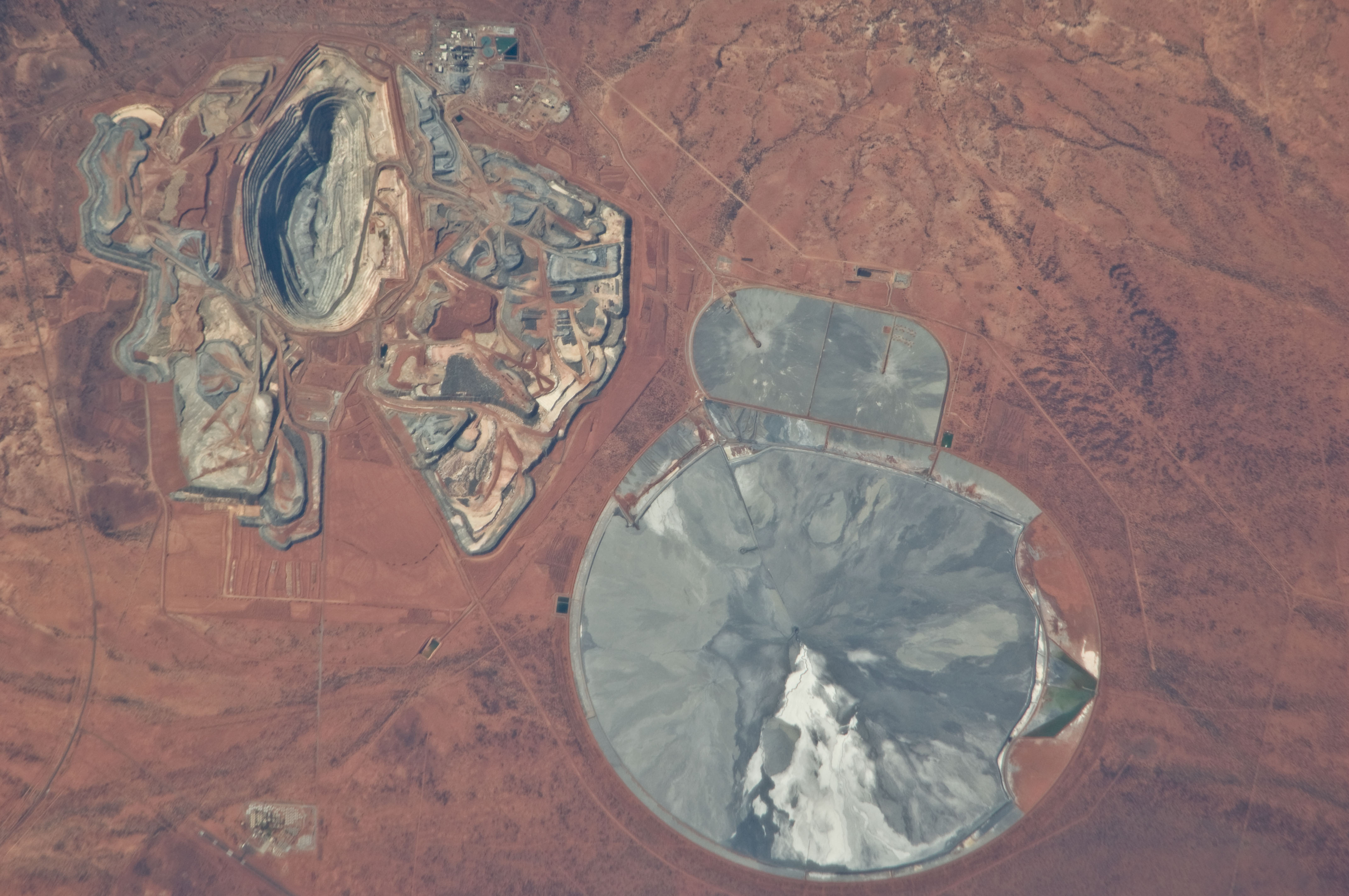
Satellite image of the Mount Keith Mine in 2010

Nickel West is a division of BHP. In Western Australia, BHP's nickel operations are combined under the Nickel West Operation which includes Mount Keith Nickel Mine, Leinster Nickel Mine, Kambalda Nickel Concentrator, Kalgoorlie Nickel Smelter and Kwinana Nickel Refinery.

Production figures published by the company at the end of 2008 are for the whole Nickel West Operations and not broken down to individual mines. In the calendar year 2008 Nickel West produced 85,800 tonnes of nickel. At the time, Nickel West also included the Ravensthorpe Nickel Mine.

In 2012 there were press reports suggesting the operations may be divested.

Due to an oversupply of nickel and a consequent drop in nickel prices, BHP announced on 11 July 2024 that it would temporarily close all of its Nickel West operations in October 2024 and place them in care and maintenance. This decision is scheduled to be reviewed in February 2027 but BHP would continue to spend $450 million annually on its nickel operations to facilitate a potential restart. The decision was estimated to affect 1,600 workers and the mines and smelters but BHP committed to offer all employees affected a redeployment or redundancy.

== Current mining operations ==
The following companies operated Nickel mines in Western Australia in 2022–23, according to the Department of Mines, Industry Regulation and Safety. To qualify for the department's official list of principal mining projects an operation has to either had mineral sales valued at more than $5 million, or, for operations where such figures are not reported, had a minimum of 50 employees:

Mine	Owner	Location	Production (tonnes)	Period	Source
Leinster Nickel Mine	BHP	Shire of Leonora	80,000^{[2]}	2022–23	
Mount Keith Mine	BHP	Shire of Wiluna	80,000^{[2]}	2022–23	
Ravensthorpe Nickel Mine	First Quantum Minerals	Shire of Ravensthorpe	21,725	2023	
Forrestania Operations	IGO	Shire of Kondinin	11,931	2022–23	
Nova Operations	IGO	Shire of Dundas	22,915^{[1]}	2022–23	
Murrin Murrin Mine	Minara Resources	Shire of Laverton	31,100^{[3]}	2023	
Kambalda Nickel Operations	Wyloo Metals	Shire of Coolgardie	1,404^{[4]}	2021–22	
Savannah Mine	Panoramic Resources	Shire of Halls Creek	5,402^{[5]}	2022–23	

- ^[1] The Nova Operations also produced 10,266 tonnes of cooper and 803 of cobalt in 2022–23
- ^[2] Production figure is for the combined Nickel West Operations
- ^[3] The Murrin Murrin Mine also produced 2,100 tonnes of cobalt in 2023
- ^[4] Production at the Kambalda Nickel Operations commenced in 2022, was sold to private company Wyloo Metals in 2023, and is scheduled to be placed into care and maintenance in May 2024
- ^[5] The Savannah mine also produced 3,129 tonnes of cooper and 368 of cobalt in 2022–23. It was subsequently placed into care and maintenance in January 2024

=== Nickel processing facilities ===
In 2020–21, BHP operates three processing facilities for Nickel in Western Australia, the Kalgoorlie Nickel Smelter, the Kambalda Nickel Concentrator and the Kwinana Nickel Refinery while Minara Resources operates the Murrin Murrin nickel refinery.

=== Former operations ===
Former operations include:

Mine	Owner	Location	Production period	Production (tonnes)	Source
Beta Hunt Mine	Karora Resources	Shire of Coolgardie	1973–2008 2014–2018		
Black Swan Nickel Mine	Poseidon Nickel	City of Kalgoorlie–Boulder	1997–2008	179,000	
Bulong Nickel Mine	Wingstar Investments	City of Kalgoorlie–Boulder	1998–2003		
Cawse mine	Wingstar Investments	City of Kalgoorlie–Boulder	1999–2008		
Cosmos Nickel Mine	IGO	Shire of Leonora	2000–2012	127,000	
Emily Ann and Maggie Hays nickel mines	Poseidon Nickel	Shire of Dundas	2001–2009		
Lanfranchi Tramways Nickel Mine	Black Mountain Metals	Shire of Coolgardie	2005–2015		
Radio Hill Nickel Mine	Artemis Resources	City of Karratha	2004–2008		
Waterloo Nickel Mine	Northern Star Resources	Shire of Leonora	2006–2008		
Windarra Nickel Mine	Poseidon Nickel	Shire of Laverton	1974–1978 1981–1991	93,446	

== Controversies ==
=== Fatalities ===
Fatalities in Western Australian nickel mining include:

- During the development of the Leinster Nickel Mine, on 27 April 1977, five employees died at the mine's Perseverance shaft after falling 35 metres in an ore bucket.
- In 1981, an employee was killed in an underground cave-in at the Leinster mine. On 11 December 1985, two men died of asphyxiation in the underground operation of the mine, the second one dying while attempting to rescue the first. On 11 April 2010, a miner fell to his death at the mines underground operation.
- On 9 June 1978, two employees were killed at the Kwinana Nickel Refinery, J. W. Bell and S. J. Haywood. Bell collapsed in a hazardous environment in a converter vessel due to what is presumed to have been a faulty seal on his face mask. Haywood attempted to assist him and both died of asphyxiation, inhaling nitrogen gas.

=== Environmental pollution ===
Despite only operating for five years from 1998 to 2003, clean-up at the Bulong Nickel Mine was reported in April 2016 to cost as much as $6.8 million. At this point, $6 million in clean-up cost had already been accumulated by the mine. A$1.1 million bond had been collected from the former owners of the mine, which proved insufficient to cover the cost. Introduced in 2013, mining companies were required to pay around one percent of their profits into a mining rehabilitation fund, which was only accessible once it reached a sum of $500 million. In 2016, this was estimated to be 20 years away and therefore not able to cover the estimated state-wide cost of $60 million to rehabilitate mines like Bulong.

Because of local concern over the state of the abandoned tailings storage facility and evaporation ponds at Bulong, the mining lease having expired in 2013, and its impact on near-by Lake Yindarlgooda, the Western Australian Department of Mines, Industry Regulation and Safety commissioned an investigation which resulted in a 900-page report published in 2021.

== Statistics ==
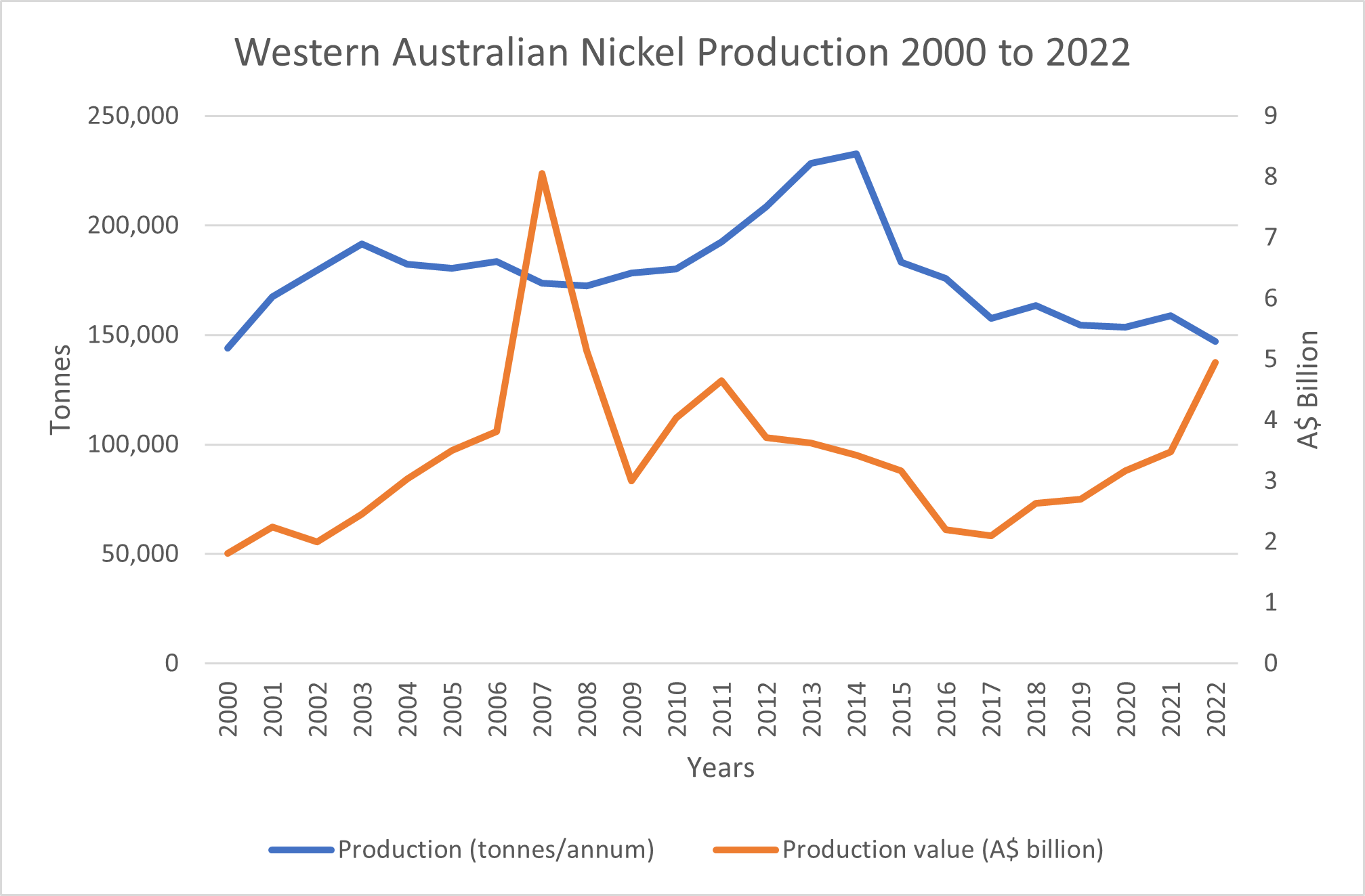
Western Australian Nickel production and value from 2000 to 2022

Annual statistics for the Western Australian nickel mining industry:

Subject	1990	1991	1992	1993	1994	1995	1996	1997	1998	1999
Production (tonnes/annum)	47,830	54,490	50,170	53,270	61,110	92,990	103,300	114,100	135,190	125,770
Production value ($A billion)	0.586	0.596	0.490	0.472	0.459	0.897	1.097	1.051	1.146	0.877

Subject	2000	2001	2002	2003	2004	2005	2006	2007	2008	2009
Production (tonnes/annum)	143,930	167,450	179,460	191,680	182,210	180,420	183,560	173,660	172,360	178,390
Production value (A$ billion)	1.806	2.239	2.002	2.458	3.031	3.503	3.815	8.059	5.142	2.997
Employees	5,038	5,160	4,699	5,714	6,704	9,423	10,583	12,736	13,307	7,561

Subject	2010	2011	2012	2013	2014	2015	2016	2017	2018	2019
Production (tonnes/annum)	180,150	192,450	208,540	228,300	232,673	183,320	175,752	157,564	163,374	154,383
Production value (A$ billion)	4.041	4.649	3.712	3.625	3.419	3.17	2.203	2.095	2.636	2.700
Employees	7,266	9,168	8,798	7,664	6,447	6,096	5,645	5,900	5,474	6,062

Subject	2020	2021	2022	2023
Production (tonnes/annum)	153,516	158,710	147,190	160,371
Production value (A$ billion)	3.168	3.480	4.946	5.743
Employees (Full time)	7,500	7,553	8,301	9,839
Employees (all personnel on site)	7,285	7,345	8,294	^{[1]}

== Notes ==
- ^[1] Full time employees only. Up until 2022, the Western Australian Mineral and Petroleum Statistics Digest listed a combined figure of both full-time employees and on-site personnel but the latter was not included in the 2022–23 edition, which only listed full-time employees.
