= Nickel mine =

Mine that produces nickel

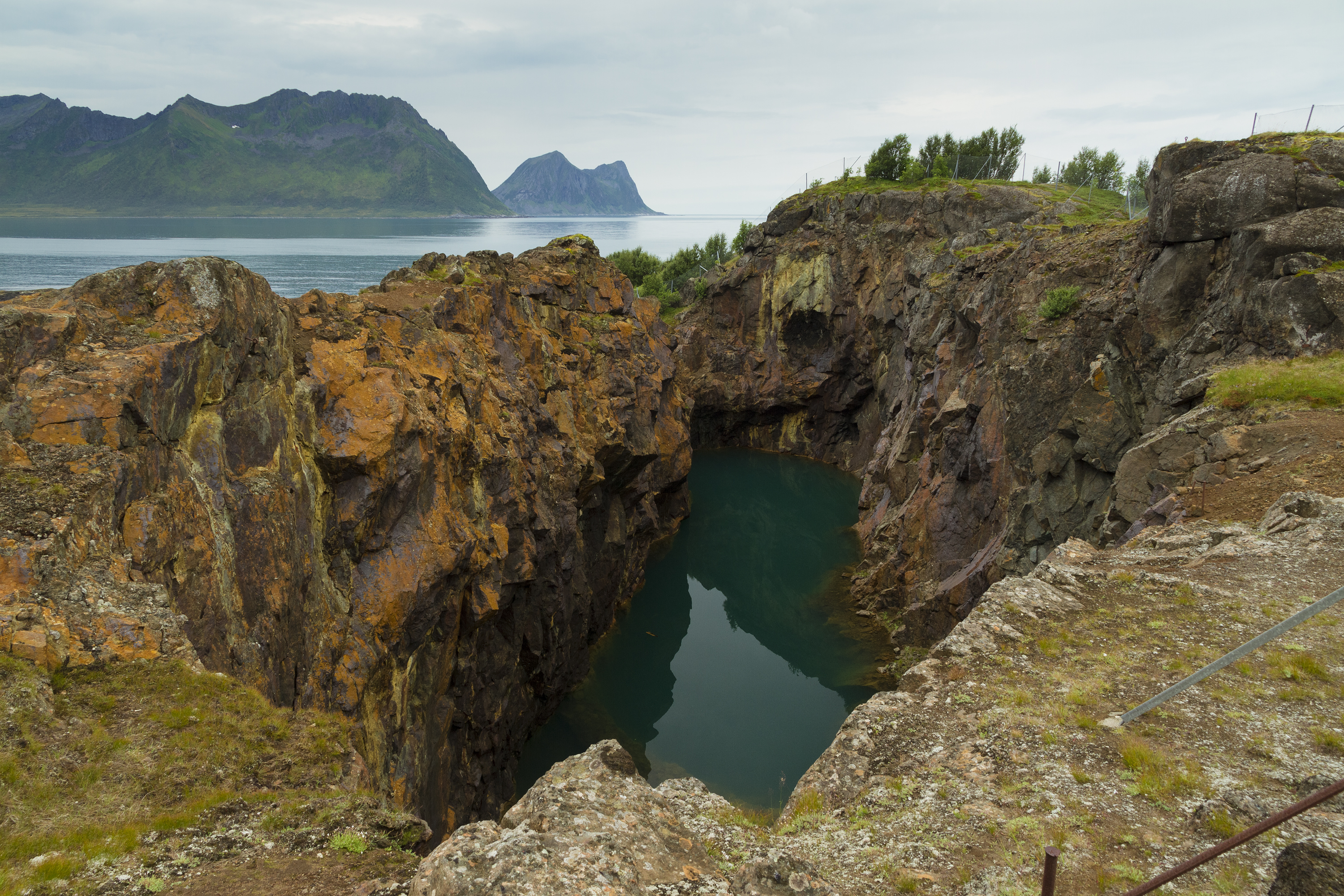
Nickel mine in Senja, Norway

A nickel mine is a mine that produces nickel. Some mines produce nickel primarily, while some mines produce nickel as a side-product of some other metal that has a higher concentration in the ore.

== Geology ==
Nickel occurs in two general types of ores, sulfides and oxides. The most important sulfide ore is pentlandite (Ni_{9}S_{8}) although many other nickel sulfides are known. Furthermore, nickel is often a constituent of iron sulfides such as pyrrhotite. The principal (i.e. economically most important) nickel oxides are nickeliferous limonite ((Fe_{1−x}Ni_{x})O(OH)·nH_{2}O). Pentlandite supplies an estimated 65% of the world's nickel but nickel laterites constitute the largest reserves.

== Extraction ==
Nickel content of its ores is often only a few percent by weight.

Sulfide ores are subjected to comminution followed by froth flotation. Pentlandite and related minerals separate with sulfides of copper, cobalt, and iron.

Two hydrometallurgical methods have been developed to extract nickel and cobalt from nickel laterites, these processes are called sulphuric acid leaching and reduction roast-ammonia leaching. For high-magnesium silicates in lower profiles laterites the exploitation method used is smelting.

== Reserves and operations ==
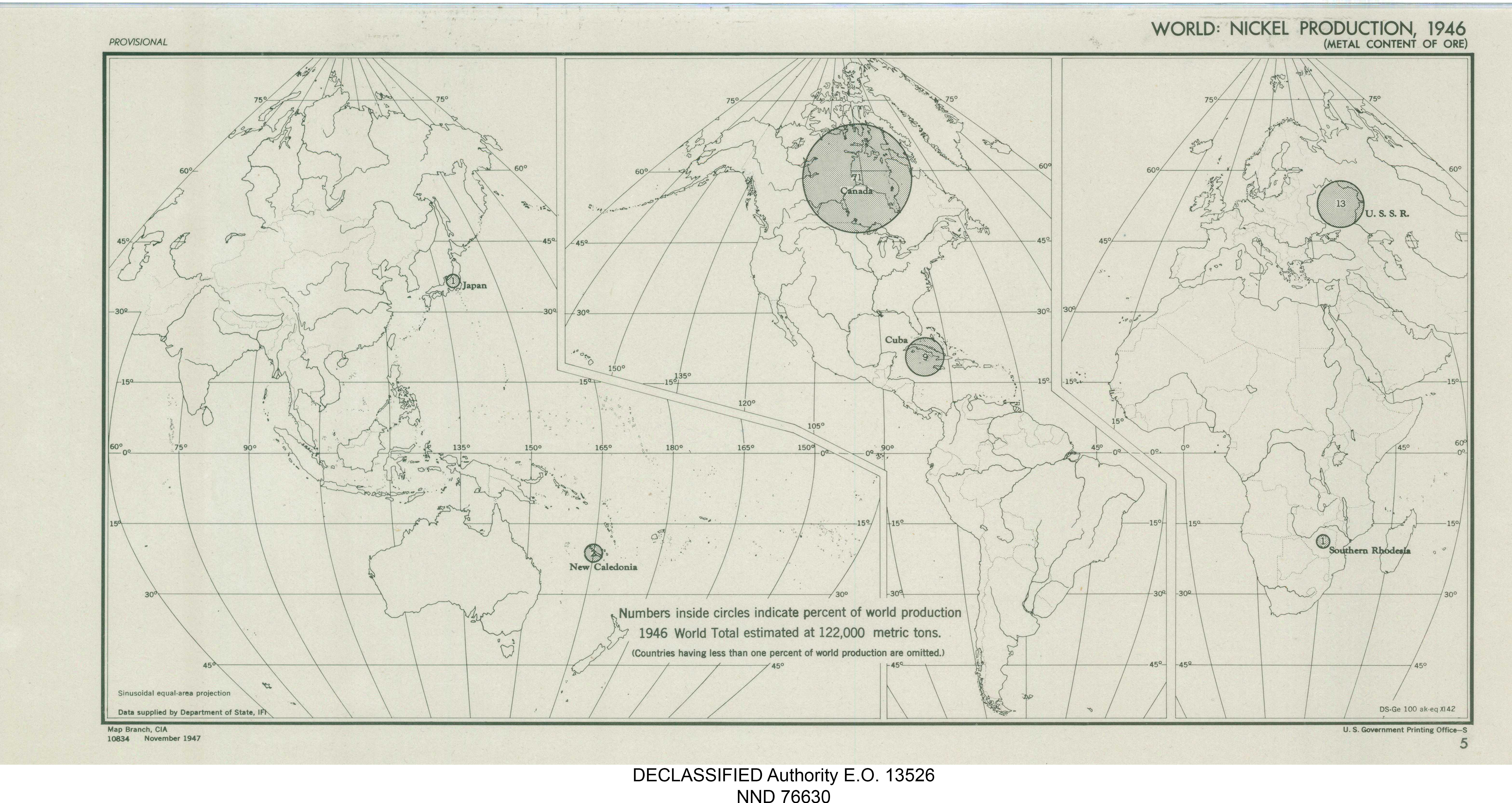
World nickel production, 1946

=== Reserves production ===
According to the intergovernmental International Nickel Study Group, in 2017 the countries with the largest volume of nickel ore reserves are Australia (19.5 million metric tons), Brazil (10.5 million metric tons), Russia (7.5 million metric tons), New Caledonia (6.5 million metric tons), Cuba (5.5 million metric tons), and the Philippines (just under 5 million metric tons). As of 2017, 33 countries produced nickel ore. Nickel production increased from 2000 to 2013 (when it peaked), decreased from 2014 to 2016, and recovered from 2017 to 2018.

=== Largest mines and operators ===
As of 2017, the largest nickel mine operators are (in descending order of kilotonnes mined):

- Vale SA, which operates Sudbury Mine (Canada), Voisey's Bay Mine (Canada), Sorowako mine (Indonesia), VNC Goro mine (New Caledonia), Onca Puma mine (Brazil) and Thompson (Canada).
- Norilsk Nickel, which operates Kola Division (Russia) and Nkomati mine (South Africa).
- Glencore, which operates Integrated Nickel Operations (Canada), Murrin Murrin (Australia), and Koniambo mine (New Caledonia).
- BHP, which operates Nickel West (Australia). BHP formerly owned Ravensthorpe Nickel Mine in Ravensthorpe, Western Australia; the mine closed in January 2009.
- Anglo American plc, which operates Barro Alto (Brazil) and Codemin (Brazil).
- South32, which operates Cerro Matoso mine (Colombia).
- Sumitomo Metal Mining Co. (SMM), which operates Sorowako (Indonesia) and Ambatovy mine (Madagascar). The company is a subsidiary of the keiretsu Sumitomo Group.
- Western Areas, which operates Spotted Quoll mine (Australia) and Flying mine (Australia).
- Lundin Mining, which operates Eagle Mine (United States).
- Terrafame Ltd., which operates Talvivaara mine in Sotkamo (Finland).

Other large nickel producers include Jinchuan Group Ltd., the largest nickel producer in China, and Sherritt, a Canadian company from Canada that refines nickel from lateritic ores and has operations in Canada, Cuba, Indonesia and Madagascar.

=== Usage ===
According to the intergovernmental International Nickel Study Group, as of 2017, an estimated 75% of primary nickel usage went to stainless steel; 3.7% went to the battery industry; and the remainder went to other applications. By 2023, approximately 65% of primary nickel usage went to stainless steel and 15% to the battery industry.

== Hazards ==
A study was conducted by scientists Dan et al on the effects of Nickel smelting fumes, to do this they did the study on NIH/3T3 cells and in the lung tissue of rats. They found that the fumes that the NIH/3T3 cells were transforming into malignant cells meaning that high exposure to Ni-smelting fumes may be harmful as Ni-smelting fumes may be a potential carcinogen in mammalian cells.

== In the Philippines ==
In the 2000s, a nickel boom began centered around Claver, Surigao del Norte in the Philippines; in 2017, the government of the Philippines (then the world's largest exporter of nickel ore) engaged in a crackdown against mine operators accused of violating environmental laws; the government closed the operations of 28 of the Philippine's 41 mining companies. In 2020, the Philippines became the world's largest producer of nickel ore, after Indonesia halted nickel ore exports; both countries had extensively supplied China, the world's largest purchaser of nickel ore. The two largest Philippine nickel companies are Nickel Asia Corp. and Global Ferronickel Holdings Inc.; both operate in the Surigao del Norte region.

Nickel mines in the Philippines, while beneficial to the economy, have been harmful to both human health and well-being as well as to the environment. One example of this is in the Mindoro Oriental region, where nickel mines have left behind toxic mine tailings. This has polluted the water, which is necessary for both humans to drink as well as for them to use for agricultural practices. The nickel mines have also destroyed lands that indigenous tribes have lived on for generations.

== Nickel mine pollution ==
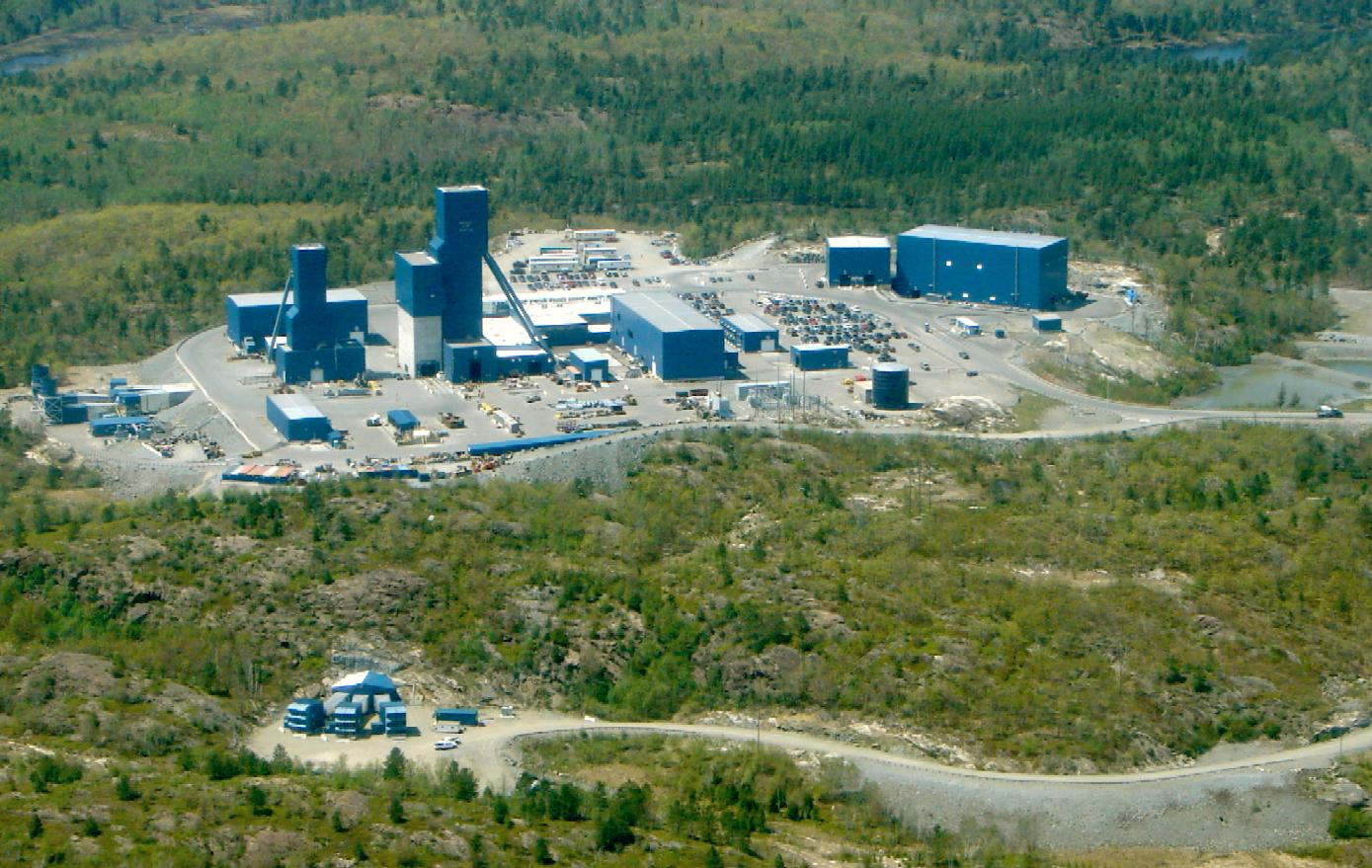
Nickel Rim mine in Sudbury, Ontario

From 1953 to 1958 Nickel Rim mines operating around Sudbury, Ontario deposited their mine tailings in an impoundment near the mine. The water in the impoundment was later tested and found to have low pH and high concentrations of iron, sulphur and dissolved metals such as aluminum and nickel. This is due to the oxidation of the tailings (usually sulfide minerals like pyrrhotite).

The limited oxygen diffusing into the layers causes the tailings to oxidize over a longer period of time, for this reason the water at the impoundment is going to discharge water with high concentrations of iron and sulphate for at least the next 50 years.

A study found that the Mount Keith Nickel Mine which is an open pit mine in Western Australia is sequestering and storing large amounts of carbon dioxide through enhanced weathering of mineral waste, this means that this mine is offsetting approximately 11% of the annual greenhouse gas emissions released by this mine.

Nickel, copper as well as cobalt deposits became the most sought-after mineral exploration sites worldwide by private companies and national governments, when nickel prices more than doubled from 2017 to 2021. In the US, the only lucrative nickel mine in Riddle, Oregon ceased operation in 1987 due to pollution concerns, but some sites are now actively re-explored as the federal government considers these deposits of strategic importance due to the increased domestic demand for electric vehicles. In 2020, highly valuable nickel, copper and cobalt occurrences were discovered near Tamarack, Minnesota. Environmental groups have expressed concerns over the potential pollution of the Kettle River headwaters, and the Mississippi watershed. The Environmental Protection Agency considers hardrock mining the top polluting industry in the US, and there is a long history of toxic emission problems at such operations around the world. Exploratory drilling near Tamarack occurred in 2022.
