= Bulong Nickel Mine =

Former nickel mine in Western Australia

- Location in Western Australia
- Interactive map of Bulong Nickel Mine
- Location: Bulong, Western Australia, Australia; 30°41′14″S 121°48′57″E
- Products: Nickel Cobalt
- Opened: 1998
- Active: 1998–2003
- Closed: 2003
- Company: Wingstar Investments
- Acquired: 2014

Bulong Nickel Mine was a surface nickel and cobalt mine near Bulong, Western Australia, 40 kilometres (25 mi) east of Kalgoorlie, adjacent to Lake Yindarlgooda.

The mine operated for only four years and was a financial failure. Despite its short operation period, it left a legacy of environmental pollution. Additionally, the mine used up to 500 kilograms (1,100 lb) of sulphuric acid per tonne of ore to remove impurities in the ore.

== History ==
The area around Bulong originally was a gold mining location, with gold being discovered there in 1893 and mined until 1908. The nickel and cobalt laterite deposit at Bulong were discovered by the exploration department of WMC Resources in 1978 but not considered viable to be mined. WMC sold the deposit to Resolution Mining in 1987. At the start of its development in the 1990s, the Bulong nickel deposit was hailed as the potential starting point of another nickel boom in Western Australia, similar to the late 1960s and early 1970s.

WMC re-acquired a 70 percent interest in the project in October 1990, forming a joint-venture with Resolute Resources by investing A$1 million in cash and a commitment to carry out a feasibility study and to manage the proposed project as well as covering the first A$10 million of it. WMC had a test pit excavated in 1992 to gather data for the potential project, at a cost of A$450,000. Resolute transferred a further 15 percent of the project to Energy Oil and Gas Ltd in 1992–93. In early 1994, WMC withdrew from the joint-venture again, after assessing the cost and the risks involved.

When commenting on the laying of the foundation stone of the project in August 1997, then-Resources Development Minister Colin Barnett praised the project and its owner, Resolute Resources, and stated that it "the project was typical of the new generation of nickel mines in WA". Bulong was one of three similar projects under development at the time, together with the Cawse Nickel Mine and the Murrin Murrin Nickel Mine, with all three suffering similar difficulties and similar delays.

In 1998, Resolute Resources sold the Bulong deposit for A$319 million to Preston Resources. The transaction was not seen as favorable for Preston, who had committed to a A$10 million penalty should the deal not go ahead, despite having only A$2 million in funds available. While Resolute Resources faced the same penalty should their board reject the sale, it had A$64 million available, leaving Preston Resources in the weaker position in the transaction.

Preston envisioned the cost to develop the mine to be A$320 million, which was to be raised through debt and equity raising, but the project received only limited interest, forcing Resolute Resources, as the underwriter, to make a substantial financial contribution. The mine subsequently underperformed in production and finances, reaching a low point of an almost A$250 million loss in 2000–01. Losses were greatly reduced the following year at just under A$10 million but, despite this, in August 2002, Preston Resources was forced to sell its complete stake in the project, which was taken over by the bondholders and Barclays, which suffered an estimated A$300 million loss in the process.

At the point of sale, Preston had accumulated A$700 million in debt, which it cleared through the sale. Despite this, the company's two-year suspension from the Australian securities exchange remained in place because of a lack of funds. Preston Resources survived its financial difficulties and suspension and, after a number of name changes, became Pantoro Limited in 2015.

One of the key reasons for the mine's failure was that the process plant of the mine was designed to extract nickel through a pressure acid leach process, developed in Cuba in the 1950s, which turned out to be unsuitable for Western Australian conditions. Addition of sulphuric acid was required to make the process work, to a degree that the mine exhausted the available supply in the state. This, combined with a grade as low as one percent and the excessive use of acid damaging the process plant eventually forced Preston Resources into near-financial collapse. The same process was also used at the Cawse Nickel Mine, which suffered a similar fate, and the Murrin Murrin Nickel Mine, which survived because of its much larger size of deposit. Reasons for the mine's lack of operational success were Bulong's nickel grade, which was comparatively low at one percent average while, at the same time, the deposit suffered from magnesium impurities of approximately five percent. As such, up to 500 kilograms (1,100 lb) of sulphuric acid were required per tonne of ore to remove the magnesium impurities, considerably higher than the comparable Cawse operation, which used 350 kilograms (770 lb) per tonne. The nickel deposit itself was located in clay, which had a tendency to bog up the process plant. Additionally, gypsum found in the clay caused calcium build-up in the pipes of the process circuits which had to be removed, causing partial plant shutdowns.

Less than a year after the sale by Preston, the operation went into receivership in May 2003, and mining operations were suspended. In 2005, the mining infrastructure was purchased by Lionore, which did not intend to use it for laterite nickel production but for the more commonplace sulphide deposits instead, while the mining tenements went to Heron Resources.

The process plant passed into the ownership of Norilsk Nickel by 2008–09, now under the name of Avalon-Bulong with just 13 people employed there. In 2014, the mine was purchased at an undisclosed sum by privately owned Wingstar Investments, alongside the Cawse mine.

Clean-up of the mining legacy at Bulong was reported in April 2016 to cost as much as A$6.8 million. At this point, A$6 million in clean-up cost had already been accumulated by the mine. A A$1.12 million bond had been collected from the former owners of the mine, which proved insufficient to cover the cost. Introduced in 2013, mining companies were required to pay around one percent of their profits into a mining rehabilitation fund, which was only accessible once it reached a sum of A$500 million. In 2016, this was estimated to be 20 years away and therefore not able to cover the estimated state-wide cost of A$60 million to rehabilitate mines like Bulong.

Because of local concern over the state of the abandoned tailings storage facility and evaporation ponds, the mining lease having expired in 2013, and its impact on near-by Lake Yindarlgooda, the Western Australian Department of Mines, Industry Regulation and Safety commissioned an investigation which resulted in a 900-page report published in 2021.

== See also ==
- List of mines in Australia
- Nickel mining in Western Australia
