= Kwinana Refinery =

Kwinana Refinery may refer to:

- Kwinana Nickel Refinery
- Kwinana Oil Refinery
