= List of acts of the Parliament of Western Australia from 1972 =

This is a list of acts of the Parliament of Western Australia for the year 1972.

== 1972 ==
Short title, or popular name	Citation	Royal assent
Long title
Western Australian Marine Act Amendment Act 1972	No. 1 of 1972	8 May 1972
An Act to amend section sixty-eight and section seventy-two of the Western Australian Marine Act, 1948-1970. (Note: Western Australian Marine Act 1948 (No. 72))
West Kambalda Railway Act 1972	No. 26 of 1972	9 June 1972
AN ACT to authorise the construction of a spur railway from the West Kalgoorlie–Lake Lefroy Railway to the Western Mining Corporation Limited mine site at West Kambalda.
Aboriginal Heritage Act 1972	No. 53 of 1972	2 October 1972
An Act to make provision for the preservation on behalf of the community of places and objects customarily used by or traditional to the original inhabitants of Australia or their descendants, or associated therewith, and for other purposes incidental thereto.
Law Reform Commission Act 1972	No. 59 of 1972	31 October 1972
An Act to establish the Law Reform Commission of Western Australia and for purposes incidental thereto.
	No. X of 1972	
Appropriation Act (Consolidated Revenue Fund) 1972-1973	No. 110 of 1972	6 December 1972
An Act to appropriate and apply out of the Consolidated Revenue Fund and from the Public Account certain sums to make good the supplies granted for the service of the year ending the 30th day of June, 1973, and to supplement grants made by the present Parliament during its first Session in adjustment of the Vote "Advance to Treasurer, 1971-72", for charges during the year ended the 30th day of June, 1972; and to approve of certain expenditure under section forty-one of the Forests Act, 1918-1969. (Note: Forests Act 1918 (No. 8 of 1919))

== Sources ==
- "legislation.wa.gov.au".
