= Windarra Nickel Mine =

Former nickel mine in Western Australia

- Location in Western Australia
- Interactive map of Windarra Nickel Mine
- Location: Laverton,Western Australia,Australia; Mount Windarra 28°29′13″S 122°14′18″E South Windarra28°36′45″S 122°14′28″E
- Products: Nickel
- Opened: 1974
- Active: 1974–1978 1981–1991
- Company: Poseidon Nickel
- Website: Poseidon Nickel website
- Acquired: 2005

The Windarra Nickel Mine was a surface and underground nickel mine near Laverton, Western Australia. The deposit was discovered in 1969 with the mine opened in 1974 by WMC Resources. Mining ceased in 1991.

Mining was carried out at two locations, South Windarra, 16 km west of Laverton, and Mount Windarra, 22 km north-west of Laverton. The process plant for the ore was located at Mount Windarra but has since been dismantled.

The discovery of nickel at Windarra triggered the 1969–70 Poseidon bubble.

== History ==
The Windarra nickel deposit was discovered in April 1969 and a high-grade nickel deposit was subsequently confirmed through drilling and announced to the stock market by Poseidon Limited. Poseidon's shares rose dramatically on this announcement, from below one Australian dollar to a height of A$280 per share. Poseidon however found it difficult to finance and develop the project. It purchased two smaller mining companies and thereby acquired a process plant and work force in Kalgoorlie but found it impractical to transport the ore from Laverton to there.

Apart from the transportation issue, Poseidon also faced a falling nickel price during 1970, a less than expected grade and amount of nickel deposit at Windarra and increasing difficulties in securing finance. A second nickel discovery in the area, at South Windarra, was made by an American consortium, which entered in an agreement with Poseidon to develop the two projects jointly. In October 1972, the chairman of Poseidon announced that the joint project had been abandoned. Instead, in December 1972, WMC acquired a 50 percent interest in the project for approximately $25 million. Poseidon would manage the project under the new ownership agreement with WMC providing assistance with some aspects of the project.

The cost to develop the project and associated infrastructure, including roads and a rail link to Kalgoorlie, proved higher than expected at $56 million. Poseidon attempted to finance this exclusively through loans. Originally, the concentrator was to be designed to process 700,000 tonnes of ore per year but this was subsequently upgraded to one million tonnes to make the project more financially viable. Nickel production at Windarra commenced in September 1974. A subsequent flood however prevented Poseidon from transporting the nickel from site and led to the company's financial position deteriorating. Eventually, in June 1975, WMC took over the management of the project.

Poseidon entered receivership in September 1976, unable to meet its loan repayments. Its 50 percent interest in Windarra was sold to the Shell in August 1977 for $31 million, which was $2 million short of what the company owed the Australian Industries Development Commission in project finance for Windarra. Poseidon did survive its time in receivership and was relisted on the stock exchange in December 1978. Poseidon eventually merged with Normandy Resources in 1991, with Poseidon being delisted on 8 May 1991 and the name company taking the name of Normandy Poseidon Limited.

WMC was forced to suspend mining at Windarra in 1978 because of low nickel but resumed in May 1981. From 1980, the facilities of the operation were used for the Lancefield Gold Mine. In May 1983, WMC acquired Shell's 50 percent interest in the project, for $500,000 per annum for the next 10 years and a production royalty.

In May 1990, the Mount Windarra mine was closed as all economically accessible ore had been extracted. South Windarra continued to be mined on a small scale and the process plant was primarily used to extract gold from the Lancefield mine. Additionally, the plant also treated some ore from the Leinster Nickel Mine. Mining at South Windarra stopped in July 1991 and, by August, all ore from the Windarra mines had been treated. The plant, until 1994, continued to process ore from Leinster and Lancefield and was removed in the following year.

Throughout its operation, the two Windarra mining locations produced 8,088,000 tonnes of ore at a grade of 1.16 percent nickel, producing 93,446 tonnes of nickel. The concentrated nickel from Windarra had been treated at WMC's Kalgoorlie Nickel Smelter.

In 2005, WMC Resources was acquired by BHP, which bundled WMC's nickel assets under its Nickel West brand.

In December 2005, Niagara Mining Limited purchased the inactive Windarra Nickel Project from BHP. Niagara Mining Limited was renamed to Poseidon Nickel Company in July 2007.

The state heritage-listed Windarra Heritage Trail was established from 1996 and opened in 1998, commemorating the history of the mine.
