= Sierra Leone Selection Trust =

Former Sierra Leone mining business

- Industry: Mining
- Founded: 1934; 92 years ago
- Defunct: 1971

The Sierra Leone Selection Trust (SLST) was formed in 1934 following an agreement between the government of British Sierra Leone and the Consolidated African Selection Trust Ltd (CAST). CAST was formed in 1924 and was part of a much larger mining finance house Selection Trust Ltd which had been founded in 1913 by Alfred Chester Beatty (an American mining magnate). Although the Oppenheimers (De Beers) invested in CAST and its subsidiaries from the 1920s and had boardroom representation, CAST was independent of the Oppenheimer empire. SLST corporation which had exclusive mineral mining rights in Sierra Leone beginning in 1935 was scheduled to last for 99 years. In 1955, the SLST abandoned mineral mining and settled on mining the Yengema and Tongo Fields. However, with the creation of the Sierra Leonean parastatal National Diamond Mining Company in 1971, the diamond company was effectively nationalized, ending the SLST in Sierra Leone.

== Sources ==
- Peter Greenhlagh - West African Diamonds - An economic history 1919–83. ISBN 0-7190-1763-7
- The Heart of the Matter: Sierra Leone, Diamonds & Human Security
