= Leinster Nickel Mine =

Nickel mine in Western Australia

- Location in Western Australia
- Interactive map of Leinster Nickel Mine
- Location: Leinster, Western Australia, Australia; 27°48′50″S 120°41′57″E
- Products: Nickel
- Production: 80,000 tonnes^{[1]}
- Financial year: 2022–23
- Opened: 1978
- Active: 1978–1986 1989–2024
- Company: BHP
- Website: BHP website
- Acquired: June 2005

Leinster Nickel Mine is a surface and underground nickel mine, 5 km north of Leinster, Western Australia. The deposit was discovered in 1971 and the mine opened in 1978, operated by the Agnew Mining Company. It was purchased by WMC Resources in 1988 which, in turn, was taken over by BHP in 2005.

The mine has suffered a number of fatalities throughout its operation, most notably on 27 April 1977, when five employees were killed in one incident.

== History ==
The nickel deposit at Leinster was discovered in 1971 by Western Selcast. To develop this asset, the Agnew Mining Company was formed in 1974, of which 60 percent was owned by Western Selcast and 40 percent by MIM Holdings, and development of the mine started in 1976, with underground mining commencing in 1978 in what was then referred to as the Agnew Mine.

In May 1978, a conventional concentrator with an annual capacity of 350,000 tonnes was commissioned at the mine, with the concentrate processed at WMC Resources's Kalgoorlie Nickel Smelter. The concentrate was transported by road to Leonora, and from there by rail to Kalgoorlie. The mine was officially opened on 5 November 1978 by Premier of Western Australia Charles Court. The concentrator of the mine was subsequently enlarged to 500,000 tonnes in 1980 and 750,000 tonnes in 1984. In 1985, BP acquired the parent company of Western Selcast, Selection Trust, and therefore a 60 percent interest in the mine.

On 15 August 1986, operations at the Agnew Mine ceased because of declining nickel prices, with the mine being placed in care and maintenance. The closure of the mine affected WMC Resources negatively as it reduced the throughput in its Kalgoorlie smelter. With BP Australia and MIM Holdings willing to sell the mine and WMC being able through its other state assets to take a long-term approach to nickel mining in Western Australia, the mine was sold in late 1988, with BP's interest sold for an undisclosed amount while MIM Holdings sold theirs for A$120 million. WMC subsequently reopened the mine, resuming operations in May 1989.

WMC renamed the mine to Leinster Nickel Operations while it renamed its local gold mine, the Emu mine, to Leinster Gold Operations, now the Agnew Gold Mine. WMC upgraded the concentrator to a capacity of one million tonnes within its first year of operations, to be doubled in the following two years. At the time of the closure in 1986, the nickel price had fallen to U$1.70 per pound while, on reopening it in 1989, prices had recovered to U$8.30 per pound.

In 2005, WMC Resources was acquired by BHP, which bundled WMC's nickel assets under its Nickel West brand, which became the largest nickel producer in the state, producing a combined 67,000 tonnes out of the 180,000 tonnes produced in Western Australia in 2004–05. At the time of the WMC acquisition by BHP, the mine employed over 1,100 people.

Due to an oversupply of nickel and a consequent drop in nickel prices, BHP announced on 11 July 2024 that it would temporarily close all of its Nickel West operations in October 2024 and place them in care and maintenance. This decision is scheduled to be reviewed in February 2027 but BHP would continue to spend $450 million annually on its nickel operations to facilitate a potential restart. The decision was estimated to affect 1,600 workers and the mines and smelters but BHP committed to offer all employees affected a redeployment or redundancy.

== Production ==
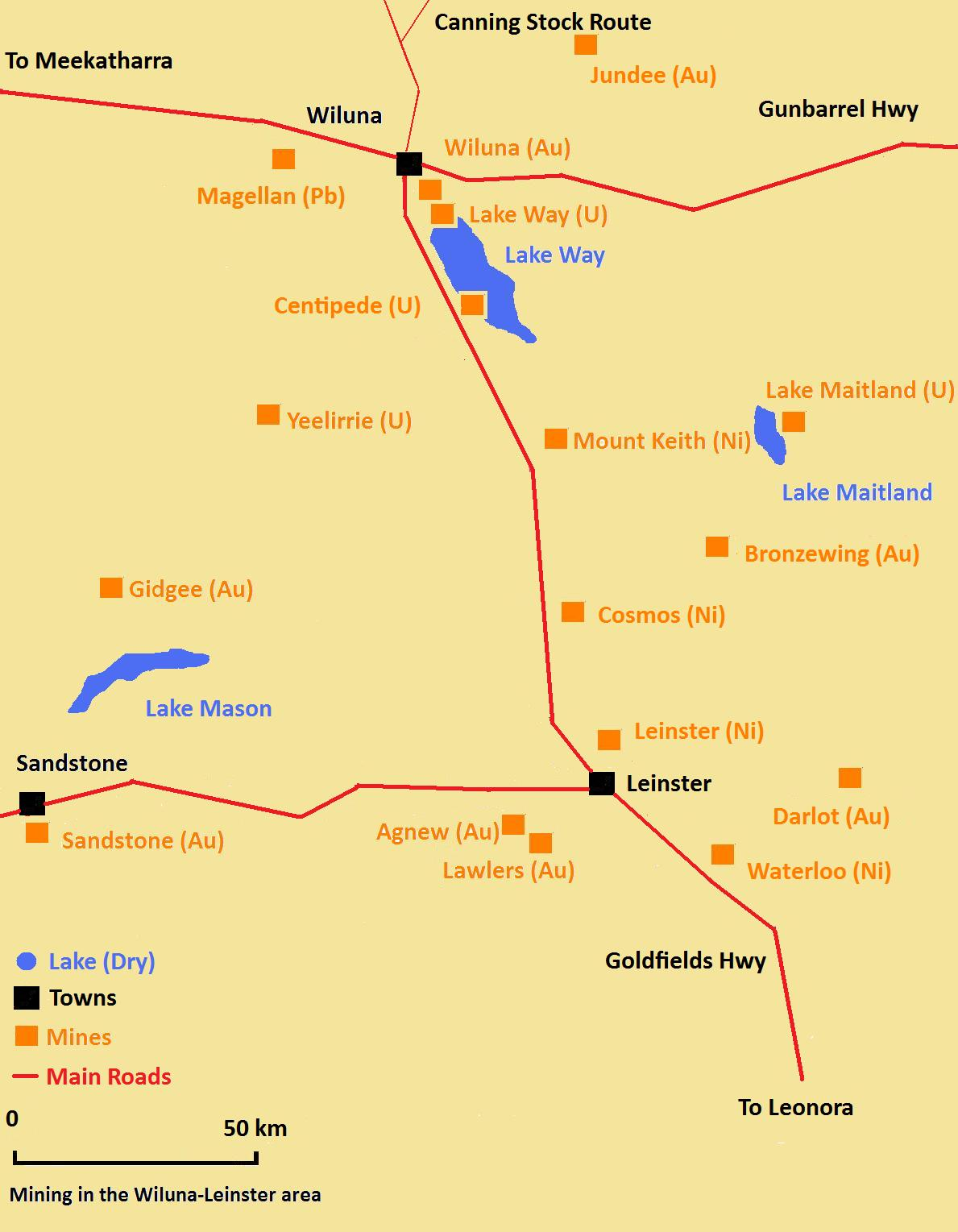
Mining in the Wiluna-Leinster area.

Leinster is part of BHP's Nickel West operations, which includes, apart from Leinster, the Mount Keith Nickel Mine, the Kambalda Nickel Concentrator, the Kalgoorlie Nickel Smelter and the Kwinana Nickel Refinery.

BHP, through its Nickel West operations, mines Nickel sulphide in open-cut and underground operations in the northern part of the Goldfields region of Western Australia. Nickel concentrate is then dried and transported by rail to the Kalgoorlie Nickel Smelter. The resulting product, containing approximately 68 percent nickel, is then once more transported by rail, now to the Kwinana Nickel Refinery. At Kwinana, it is converted to nickel metal at a grade of 99.8 percent. This product is then shipped via the Port of Fremantle.

Production figures published by the company for the whole Nickel West Operations and not broken down to individual mines. In 2020–21, Nickel West produced 89,000 tonnes of nickel, an eleven percent increase of production in comparison to the previous year. The average sale price for the produced nickel was US$16,250 per tonne. In 2021–22, Nickel West's nickel production fell to 77,000 tonnes.

As of 2022, mining occurs at the Camelot open-pit and the Venus and B11 underground operations, while mining at the Rocky’s Reward open pit ceased in 2021. Underground mining at Leinster was suspended between 2013 and 2016. Ore for the mine is also sourced from the Cliffs mine, which opened in 2008 and is located south of the Mount Keith mine, supplying ore to both.

== Fatalities ==
During the development of the mine, on 27 April 1977, five employees died at the mine's Perseverance shaft after falling 35 metres in an ore bucket. In 1981, an employee was killed in an underground cave-in. On 11 December 1985, two men died of asphyxiation in the underground operation of the mine, the second one dying while attempting to rescue the first. On 11 April 2010, a miner fell to his death at the mines underground operation.

The fatality of the five miners in 1977 resulted in a trial for manslaughter in the Kalgoorlie Supreme Court of four employees at the mine, the registered manager, the master shaft-sinker, an electrical engineer and a winder-driver.

== Notes ==
- ^[1]Production figure is for the combined Nickel West Operations, which consists of the Mount Keith Mine, Leinster Mine and Cliffs Mine.
