= Mount Keith Mine =

Nickel mine in Western Australia

Mount Keith
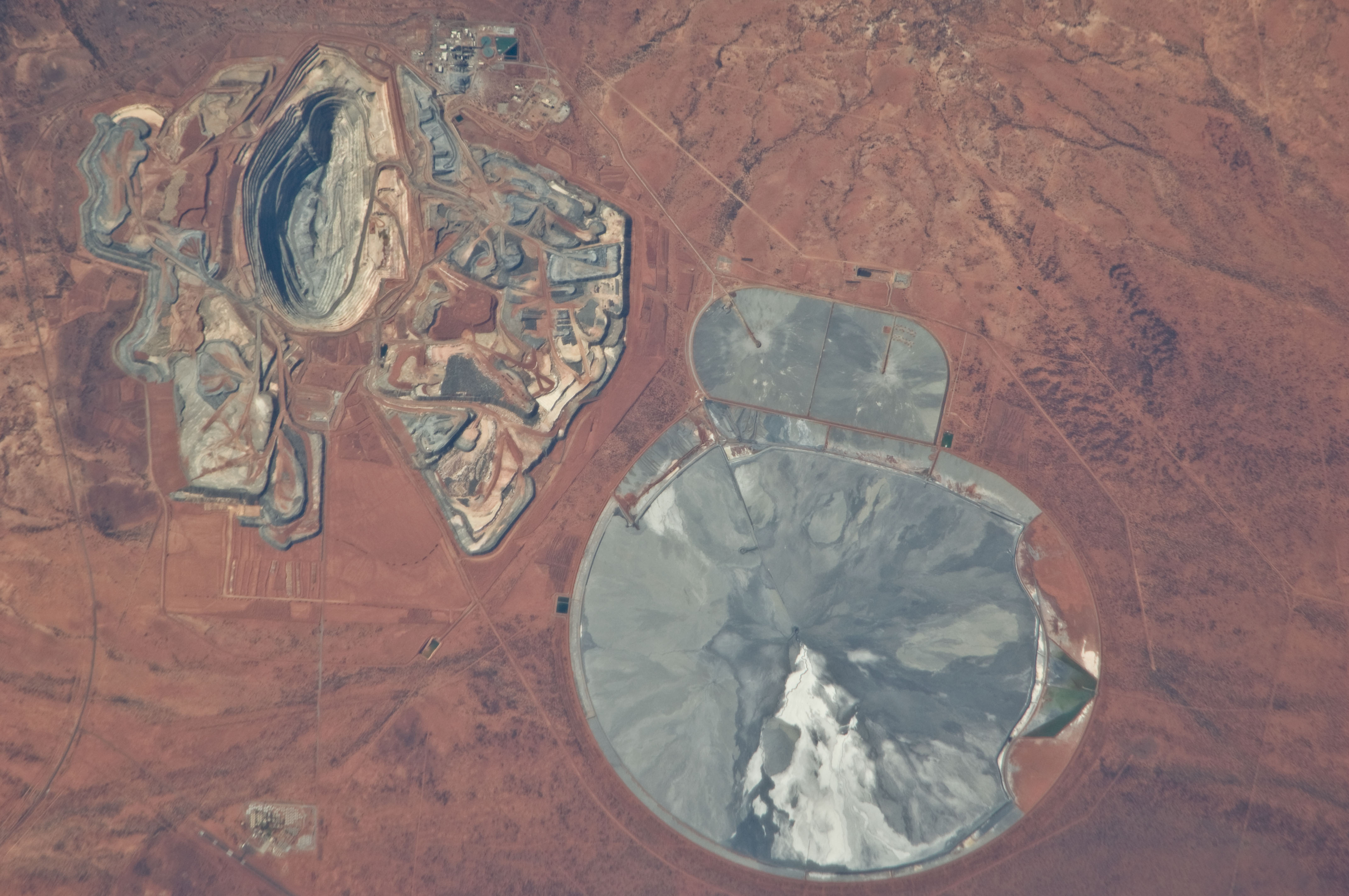
- Satellite image of the mine in 2010

- Location in Western Australia
- Interactive map of Mount Keith
- Location: Wiluna,Western Australia,Australia; 27°12′48″S 120°33′06″E
- Products: Nickel
- Production: 80,000 tonnes^{[1]}
- Financial year: 2022–23
- Opened: 1995
- Closed: 2024
- Company: BHP
- Website: BHP website
- Acquired: June 2005

Mount Keith Mine is an open pit nickel mine in Western Australia. It is operated by BHP. The site's closest landmark is the town of Wiluna, 85 km (53 mi) to the north.

The mine, originally opened in 1995, is operated by BHP and part of its Nickel West operations. Having originally been built by WMC Resources, it changed ownership in 2005 when BHP acquired WMC.

== Overview ==
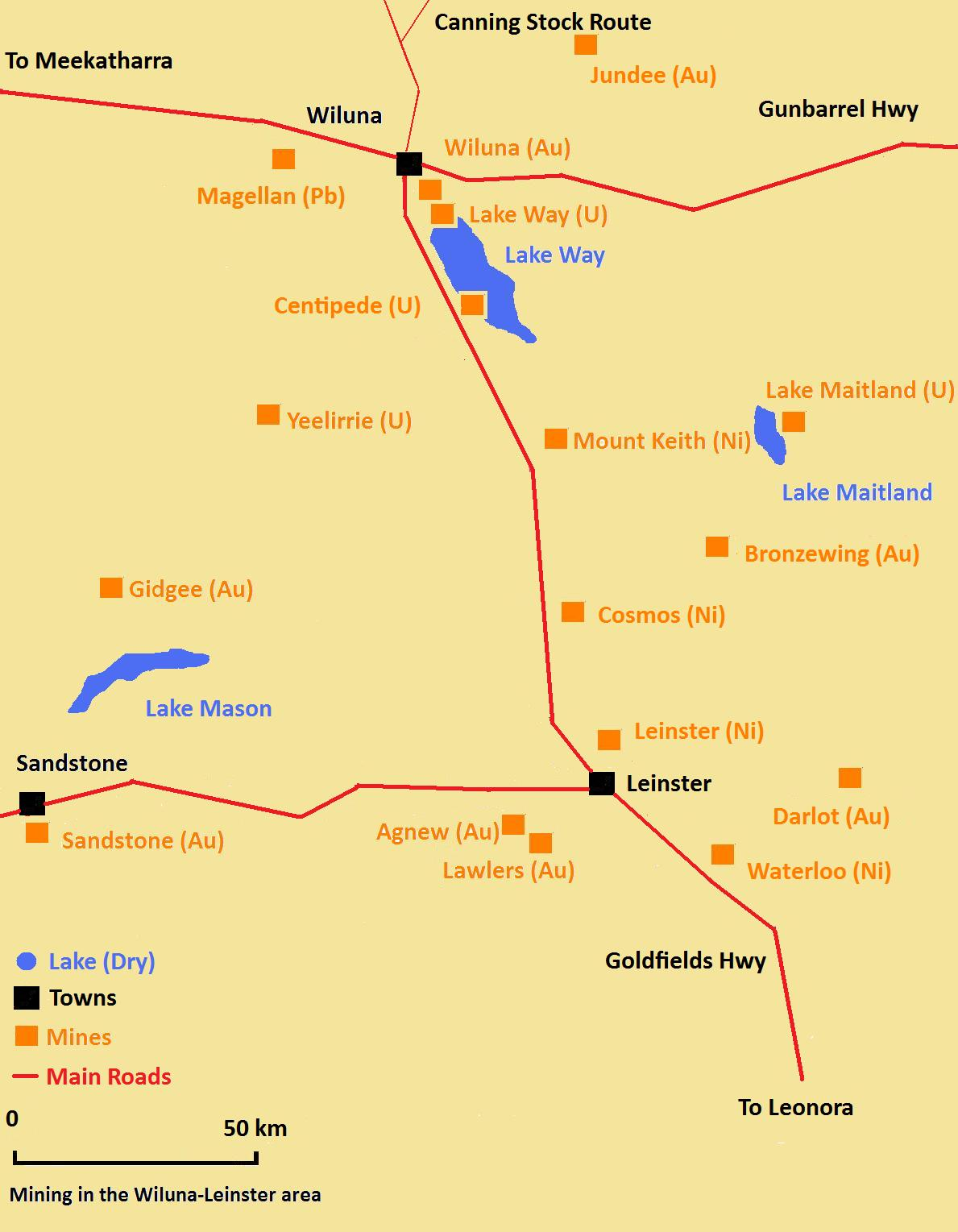
Mining in the Wiluna-Leinster area.

The mine is located on the north end of the 800 km (500 mi) long Norseman-Wiluna Greenstone belt, with nickel sulphide deposits of the dyke-like or sill deposit type. The important known nickel deposits are in the ultramafic rocks of the lower cycle, around 2700 Ma old. In 1971, the mine was thought to be able to provide 10% of the world's demand for nickel; in 1992 it was estimated as containing 270 million tons of sulphide ore, grading 0.6% nickel, enough for about twenty years.

== History ==
The deposits was originally discovered through exploration drilling by Metals Exploration Limited in 1969. Australian Consolidated Minerals (ACM) initially held a 16 percent stake in the venture, something the company gradually increased to 100 percent by 1988. Despite the early discovery, the mine was not developed at the time because of low nickel prices in the 1970s and the project's large infrastructure costs. Changes to Western Australian mining in the 1980s, the move towards fly-in fly-out operations rather than the workforce residing in fully developed towns reduced the potential cost of the project and ACM started to review the project again in 1988.

ACM entered an equal joint venture with Outokumpu to develop Mount Keith at a projected cost of $417 million and a start-up date of May 1992. WMC Resources (WMC) for a time, held a substantial interest in ACM, owning 20 percent of the company's shares in 1987, but soon sold these again for a profit. In May 1991, ACM's managing director approached WMC as well as a few other mining companies with the request of taking over the former. WMC Resources concluded that it wasn't interested in the takeover but wanted to acquire the Mount Keith project. Among the companies approached, Normandy Poseidon, led by Robert Champion de Crespigny, was interested in ACM's gold projects, and WMC and Normandy agreed to make a joint bid for the company and to split the assets afterwards, with WMC receiving the nickel assets and Normandy the gold ones. The joint offer was eventually successful, with the final transactions completed in June 1992. The final deal saw Outokumpu re-involved in the project, with WMC selling 50 percent of the Mount Keith project to the Finnish company.

WMC declared that it was ready to proceed with the project on 11 February 1993, now at an estimated cost of A$450 million, but Outokumpu was unwilling to commit to the mine and, 11 days later, sold its stake back to WMC for cash and considerations. Construction of the mine commenced soon after and activities at the mine peaked in 1994 with a construction work force of 1,000 people on site at the time. Commissioning of the plant began in November 1994 and shipment of first ore took place in 1995.

In 2005, WMC Resources was acquired by BHP, which bundled WMC's nickel assets under its Nickel West brand, which became the largest nickel producer in the state, producing a combined 67,000 tonnes out of the 180,000 tonnes produced in Western Australia in 2004–05. At the time of the WMC acquisition by BHP, the mine employed 950 people.

In 2009, BHP reduced the mine's activity, laying off 300 employees.

Due to an oversupply of nickel and a consequent drop in nickel prices, BHP announced on 11 July 2024 that it would temporarily close all of its Nickel West operations in October 2024 and place them in care and maintenance. This decision is scheduled to be reviewed in February 2027 but BHP would continue to spend $450 million annually on its nickel operations to facilitate a potential restart. The decision was estimated to affect 1,600 workers and the mines and smelters but BHP committed to offer all employees affected a redeployment or redundancy.

== Production ==
Mount Keith is part of BHP's Nickel West operations, which includes, apart from Mount Keith, the Leinster Nickel Mine, the Kambalda Nickel Concentrator, the Kalgoorlie Nickel Smelter and the Kwinana Nickel Refinery.

After crushing and processing the ore on site, nickel concentrate is transported by road from the mine to Leinster for drying and subsequent on-shipping.

Production figures published by the company for the whole Nickel West Operations and not broken down to individual mines. In 2020–21, Nickel West produced 89,000 tonnes of nickel, an eleven percent increase of production in comparison to the previous year. The average sale price for the produced nickel was US$16,250 per tonne. In 2021–22, Nickel West's nickel production fell to 77,000 tonnes.

== Notes ==
- ^[1]Production figure is for the combined Nickel West Operations, which consists of the Mount Keith Mine, Leinster Mine and Cliffs Mine.
