= List of heritage places in the Shire of Laverton =

List of heritage sites in Western Australia

The State Register of Heritage Places is maintained by the Heritage Council of Western Australia. As of 2026, 39 places are heritage-listed in the Shire of Laverton, of which two are on the State Register of Heritage Places, the former Hotel Australia and the Mount Margaret Mission Hospital ruin.

== List ==
=== State Register of Heritage Places ===
The Western Australian State Register of Heritage Places, as of 2026, lists the following state registered places within the Shire of Laverton:

Place name	Place #	Street number	Street name	Suburb or town	Co-ordinates	Notes & former names	Photo
Hotel Australia (former)	1453	10	Laver Place	Laverton	28.62653°S 122.403932°E	Cobb & Co Depot, Australia Hotel, The Coach House Cafe, Australia Hostel	
Mt Margaret Mission Hospital (ruin)	3130			Mount Margaret Aboriginal Community	28.796025°S 122.186392°E		

=== Shire of Laverton heritage-listed places ===
The following places are heritage listed in the Shire of Laverton but are not State registered:

Place name	Place #	Street #	Street name	Suburb or town	Notes & former names	Photo
Residence	502		Euro Street	Laverton		
Railway Crane	585			Laverton		
Old Court House Complex	1449			Laverton	Laverton Warden's Court (former)	
Old Police Complex	1450	14	Erlistoun Street	Laverton		
Lancefield Minesite: Brick Stack and Roaster	1451			Laverton		
Hall	1452			Laverton		
Roads Board Office (former)	1454			Laverton	Residence	
Palace Hotel (former)	1455		Laver Place	Laverton	Desert Inn Hotel	
Laverton Post Office (Unofficial)	1456		Laver Place	Laverton		
Laverton School (former)	1457		Gladiator Street	Laverton		
Mount Morgan Municipal Chambers (former)	1458	On former	Malcolm-Leonora Road 40 km South-West of Laverton	Mount Morgans		
Mt Crawford Post Office (former)	2038		Weld Drive	Laverton	Station Building, Laverton Sports Club	
Windarra Heritage Trail	2696	Off	Leonora-Laverton Rd, 28 k North of	Laverton	Windarra Nickel Project	
Anaconda Mine	3774			Mount Margaret		
Yundamindera Mine	3775			Mount Margaret		
Burtville Hotel	4171			Burtville via Laverton	Burtville Arch	
Thaduna Mine	4753			Peak Hill		
Lancefield Mine	8726			Mount Margaret		
Ricci Mine	9254			Peak Hill		
Laverton War Memorial & Don Leahy Memorial Plaque	13008		McPhearson Place	Laverton		
Laverton Fire Station	14539	Corner	Euro & Gladiator Streets	Laverton		
Police Station (former)	16183			Laverton		
Gaol (former)	16184			Laverton		
Residence	16185			Laverton	Police Sergeant's House	
Station Master's House (former), Laverton	16186		Spence Street	Laverton	Residence	
Kumarina Mine Group	16327			Peak Hill		
Mount Morgans Townsite	16603			Mount Morgans		
Cox Find Mine	16672			Mount Margaret		
Murrin Murrin Mine	16673			Mount Margaret		
Harbour Lights Mine	16674			Mount Margaret		
Ida H Mine	16675			Mount Margaret		
Cosmopolitan Mine	16676			Mount Margaret	Champion Mine, Lubra Queen Mine	
Lancefield (WA) Gold Mine	16677			Mount Margaret		
Nangeroo Mine	16678			Mount Margaret		
Laverton Police Station, Courthouse & Quarters	17332		Augusta Street	Laverton	Laverton Police Station & Courthouse	
Baker Lake Area, Laverton	18594		Warburton Road	Warburton		
Laverton State Battery	27309	13	Cox Street	Laverton		
