= Poseidon bubble =

Australian stock market bubble

Poseidon Bubble
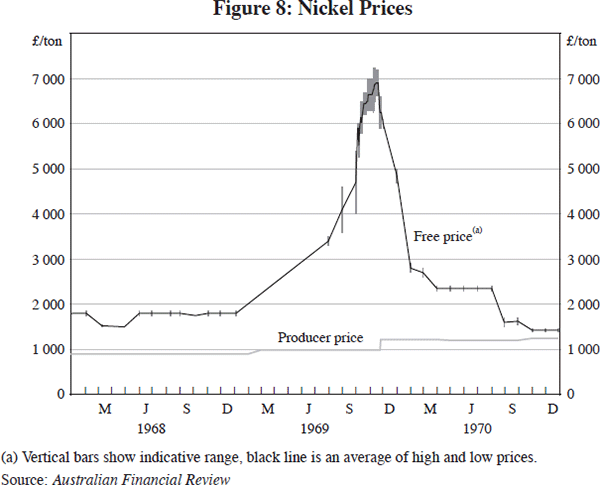
- A graph of nickel prices during the bubble
- Date: September 1, 1969 – January 1, 1970
- Duration: 4 months
- Location: Australia
- Type: Stock market bubble
- Cause: Discovery of nickel during a shortage

Poseidon NL
- Type: Public
- Traded as: ASX: POS
- Industry: Mining
- Founded: 1969; 57 years ago
- Defunct: 1991; 35 years ago
- Successor: Normandy Resources
- Headquarters: Australia

The Poseidon bubble was a stock market bubble in which the price of Australian mining shares soared in late 1969, then crashed in early 1970. It was triggered by the discovery by Poseidon NL of the early indications of a promising nickel deposit in September 1969.

In the late 1960s, nickel was in high demand due to the Vietnam War, but there was a shortage of supply due to industrial action against the major Canadian supplier Inco. These factors pushed the price of nickel to record levels, peaking at around £7,000/ton (£113,000 in 2018 adjusted for inflation) on the London market early in November 1969. In September 1969, the mineral exploration company Poseidon NL made a major nickel discovery at Mount Windarra 22 kilometres (14 mi) northwest of Laverton, Western Australia. In early September its shares, which had been trading at $0.80, began rising on insider trading (which was not illegal at the time). On 1 October, Poseidon announced that drilling had struck 40 metres of ore averaging 3.56% nickel and the share price immediately rose until Poseidon shares were trading at $12.30. After that, very little further information came to light but the price continued to climb on speculation. At one point, a UK broker suggested a value of up to $382 a share.

The price of Poseidon shares quickly became too high for many investors, so some turned to stocks in other companies exploring near Windarra, and eventually other nickel mining stocks in general. As the price of mining shares grew, new companies were listed by promoters hoping to cash in. From October to December 1969 the ASX All Mining index rose by 44%. Mining stocks peaked in January 1970, then immediately crashed. Poseidon shares peaked at an intraday high of $280 in February 1970, and fell rapidly thereafter.

By the time Poseidon actually started producing nickel, the price of nickel had fallen. Also, the nickel ore was of a lower grade than originally thought and extraction costs were higher. Profits from the mine were not sufficient to keep Poseidon afloat and it went into receivership in 1974. The company was delisted from the stock exchange in 1976. Western Mining then took over management of the mine, operating it until 1991. Mining ceased at Mount Windarra in 1989, and at South Windarra in 1991. Mount Windarra produced 5.3 million tonnes of ore grading 1.5% nickel during the life of the mine.

In 1974, the Rae Committee handed down its report on the Poseidon bubble, which documented numerous cases of improper trade practices. It recommended a number of changes to the regulation of stock markets, which ultimately led to Australia's national companies and securities legislation.

Poseidon Limited entered receivership in September 1976, unable to meet its loan repayments but did survive its time in receivership and was relisted on the Australian stock market in December 1978. Poseidon eventually merged with Robert Champion de Crespigny-led Normandy Resources in 1991, with Poseidon being delisted on 8 May 1991 and the name company taking the name of Normandy Poseidon Limited.
