= Minara Resources =

Mining company in Western Australia

- Type: Subsidiary
- Traded as: ASX: MRE
- Industry: Mining
- Founded: 1994
- Defunct: October 2011
- Headquarters: Perth, Western Australia
- Website: www.minara.com.au

Minara Resources was a mining company in Western Australia, specialising in the mining of cobalt and nickel. Minara operated the Murrin Murrin Mine located in the north-east Western Australian Goldfields.

Based in Perth, Minara Resources was founded in 1994 as the successor to Anaconda Nickel which was founded by Fortescue chief Andrew Forrest. In 2006, it had a market capitalisation of approximately $1.3 billion. At the time of takeover, it was valued at $1.02 billion.

In August 2011, Glencore launched a successful takeover offer for the 27% of shares it didn't own. Minara Resources was delisted from the Australian Securities Exchange in October 2011.
