= Selection Trust =

British mining finance house

Selection Trust was a British mining finance house. It was started in 1913 by A. Chester Beatty, a mining engineer from the United States. After the end of the First World War, Beatty built up a substantial portfolio of mining interests, many of them in Africa, but others in Serbia and in Siberia. Initially the company began operations by sharing an office at Number One London Wall in the City of London with the consulting firm of Herbert Hoover, a fellow American mining engineer.

The company was chiefly known for its investments in mining for base metals, diamonds and oil. The countries in which it operated included the US, Canada, Mexico, Nicaragua, Guatemala, Chile, Brazil, Peru, Burma, Australia, South Africa, Angola, Tanzania, Northern Rhodesia, Sierra Leone, the Gold Coast, French Guinea, Botswana, Hungary, Russia, Yugoslavia and the USSR. It was pioneer in the early days of the North Sea oil and gasfields.

== Structure ==
Mining finance houses were principally holding companies that create subsidiaries in which they either partly or wholly owned the capital of the mining companies in the group, but mostly maintained control. Many of these subsidiaries were listed on the same as the master company or on other stock exchanges. In the case of Selection Trust, many of these entities were clearly group companies due to their naming. Examples of this were Consolidated African Selection Trust, Rhodesian Selection Trust, Gold Coast Selection Trust and Sierra Leone Selection Trust.

== Rhodesian Selection Trust ==
One of the key early building blocks of the mining finance house was its interests in the copper belt of Central Africa. The Rhodesian Selection Trust Limited (RST) was a copper mining corporation which operated in the Copperbelt region of Northern Rhodesia. In 1926, RST took over the Roan Antelope and Rietbok claims from the Bwana Mkubwa Company and the Rhodesia Copper and General Exploration and Finance Company, with the RST dominating the company shareholdings. Rhodesian Selection Trust was formed in 1928. The company was renamed Roan Selection Trust in 1964 after the break-up of the Central African Federation and the independence of Northern Rhodesia as the new state of Zambia.

== Other ventures ==
=== In the USSR ===
One of the company's least successful ventures was a partnership with Calouste Gulbenkian in which the new Leninist regime of the Soviet Union awarded the Lena Goldfields and the Tetiuhe Mining Company to the partners. Factional fighting within the USSR ultimately made operations impossible.

=== In Kosovo ===
A more successful between-the-wars venture was the development of the Trepča Mines in Kosovo, then part of the Kingdom of the Serbs, Croats, and Slovenes (later Yugoslavia). In 1925 an exploration program was launched to assess the potential of the lead-zinc deposit there. The 50-year concession was obtained in 1926 by Selection Trust from Rade Pašić, son of Nikola Pašić, Yugoslav prime minister until the same year. On 9 September 1927 Selection Trust launched its Trepča Mines Limited subsidiary in London. Mining operations began in 1930 with pilot production of sulphide Lead and Zinc mineralisations. The mine was appropriated by the Germans upon their invasion of Yugoslavia, and Trepča at one point was supplying 40% of all the lead required for the German war effort.

=== In Australia ===
With rapid decolonialisation in Africa in the 1950s and 1960s, the company increased its presence in Australia. A major success was its involvement in the early phases of the country's iron ore expansion through the Mount Newman discovery. The company became even more prominent from the late 1960s for its involvement in the nickel boom. Rising world nickel prices and a prolonged strike at an Inco's Creighton Mine nickel mine at Sudbury, Ontario meant that the discoveries were rapidly developed, bringing about a frenzied market in nickel explorers and developers between 1967 and 1971. The boom was triggered by the discovery of significant nickel resources in Kambalda, Western Australia in 1966, Mount Windarra in 1969 and Agnew (by Selection Trust and its satellite, Consolidated African Selection Trust) in 1971. It was noticeable that Agnew was initially largely in the hands of London investors and that the sole Australian connection was an indirect 2.4% stake in the project held by Selcast Exploration, a locally listed satellite of Selection Trust. This imbalance was partly remedied by Mount Isa Mines buying into the control group of the project.

== Succession and acquisition by BP ==
In 1950, Chester Beatty handed control of Selection Trust over to his son, also named Alfred Chester Beatty, who ran it until 1968. It was acquired by BP in August 1980, and named successively, BP Minerals International Ltd and BP Minerals Development Ltd. The acquisition by BP was the largest takeover in the history of the London Stock Exchange at the time. Most of BP's minerals assets were sold to the British mining company Rio Tinto Zinc for £2.38 billion in 1989.
