= Sorowako =

- Mining town
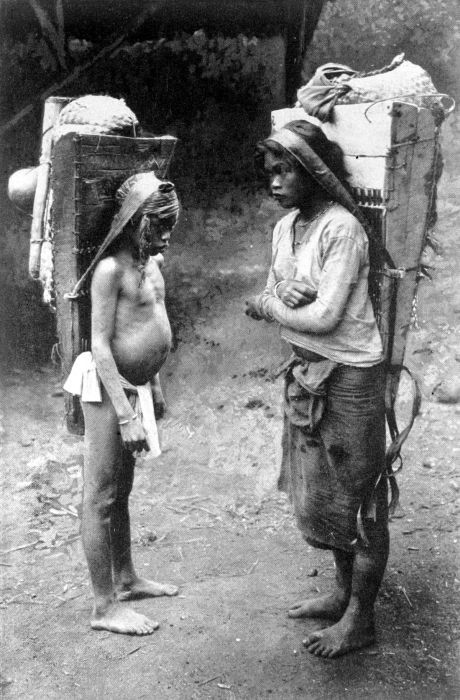
- Two porters from Sorowako, c. 1900–1940.
- Nickname: City of Nickel
- Location within Indonesia
- Coordinates: 2°31′13″S 121°21′27″E
- Country: Indonesia
- Province: South Sulawesi
- Regency: East Luwu
- Time zone: UTC+8 (WITA)
  - Summer (DST): UTC+8 (not observed)

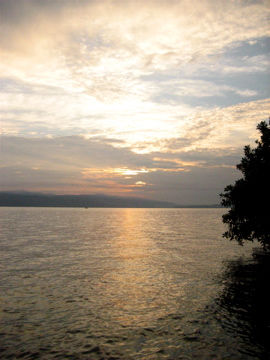
Sunset view from the edge of Lake Matano in Sorowako, Indonesia.

Sorowako, also spelled Soroako, is a small mining town in the north-east of South Sulawesi province, in the centre of Sulawesi island in Indonesia. It is the location of the Sorowako Mine, which is the largest open-pit mine in Indonesia, owned by PT Vale Indonesia, a subsidiary of the Canadian based mining company Vale Inco.

== Geography ==
It is located in the Verbeek mountains, Sorowako is surrounded by three natural lakes: Lake Matano, Lake Towuti, and Lake Mahalona. Matano is the deepest lake in Indonesia.

Lake Matano is surrounded by ring of small mountain rock. The weather sometimes can be very severe, often with thunder and lightning storms. Small earthquakes are common as well. Almost every year in December–January, a strange phenomenon occurs in the center of Lake Matano. A large tornado appears to stand still in the middle of the lake and remains there for a short time. Seen from shore the tornado looks to have a diameter of approximately 10 meters. While the tornado is standing still above the lake a cloud comes down to the surface of the lake and then seems to come up again through the funnel of the tornado.

The source of Lake Matano is believed come from an area west of the lake that the native people call Matano village. In this area one can sometimes see white-bellied sea eagle.

== Demographics ==
The original inhabitants of Sorowako were the Padoe people, who spoke the Padoe language. Due to the expansion of the mining industry, native Sorowako residents have become increasingly difficult to find; they are a minority. In the food industry sectors, such as home-based stalls, grocery stalls, and food stalls that line the Magani Market and Sorowako Market near Lake Matano, the dominant ethnic groups are the Rongkong, Torajan, Bugis, Mandarese, or Javanese. The influx of immigrants since the opening of the mine has changed the social space there.

In the 1950s, when the DI/TII rebellion was raging in South Sulawesi, the Sorowako area was not spared from the onslaught of the Indonesian National Army. The indigenous population fled, unable to withstand the intimidation and forced conversion to Islam by the DI/TII. The native people of Sorowako initially embraced their native animist beliefs. Over time, the Padoe people, who are the original inhabitants of Sorowako, began to spread out from their original area, especially to the interior, some of them mingled with the coastal communities which were dominated by Islam. If we classify the population with a rough estimate of reality, it is estimated that currently the ethnic groups that inhabit Sorowako the most are Rongkong, Torajan, Javanese, Bugis, and Mandarese who also inhabit several surrounding areas.

Currently, most of Sorowako's residents work as employees for the mining company PT. Vale Indonesia, Tbk. (before PT. Inco). They come to Sorowako from all over Indonesia. The rest of the population work primarily as farmers or fishermen. In the mountain side on the west side of town there is a natural cave that remains largely unexplored. Near the entrance is a chamber full of hundreds of skeletons that some say are the remains of a rebel force (DI/TII) from the 1950s and others claim is actually a native cemetery (similar to the cemetery caves of Tana Toraja).
