= Sorowako mine =

Nickel mine in Indonesia

Sorowako Mine
- Location within Sulawesi
- Location: Sulawesi, Indonesia; 2°34′25″S 121°22′27″E
- Products: Nickel-in-matte
- Production: US$1,232 million
- Financial year: 2023
- Type: surface
- Discovered: 1901
- Opened: 1978
- Company: Mining Industri Indonesia (MIND ID) 34% Vale Canada 33.9% Sumitomo Metal Mining 11.5% Others 20.6%
- Acquired: 2024

The Sorowako mine is a large open pit lateritic nickel mine in the east of Indonesia in the Verbeek Mountains of Sulawesi (the Celebes). It lies just south of Lake Matano. As of 2023, Sorowako is one of the largest nickel mines in the world with proven and probable nickel reserves of 107 million tonnes of ore grading 1.70% nickel, containing 1.81 million tonnes of nickel metal.

== History ==
Nickel was first discovered at Sorowako in 1901 by the Dutch missionary, ethnographer, and amateur mineralogist, Albert Kruyt. In 1915, the Dutch mining engineer Eduard C. Abendanon confirmed that report. In 1934, H. R.‘Flat’ Elves, an Inco geologist, dug test pits and did a feasibility study.

In 1968, Inco, as PT Inco, received the mining concession in Sorowako and began mapping and exploratory analysis. In 1977, it opened a smelter and the following year began commercial production, in April 1978.

In 2006 when Vale S.A. purchased Inco, PT Inco (Indonesian Inco) was reorganized with changed percentages of ownership and became PT Vale (Vale Indonesia), a subsidiary of Vale S.A.

== Mine ==
The mine is an open pit surface mine. The ore is smectite containing disseminated nickel as fine-grained manganese-nickel silicates in a laterite profile. The major nickel mineral is garnierite.

The ore is treated in a co-located processing plant to produce an intermediate nickel-in-matte product used in the manufacture of refined nickel. The 2023 annual ore production was 13,452,663 tonnes (2022: 11,552,911 tonnes) to produce 70,728 tonnes of nickel matte (2022: 60,090 tonnes). The matte has an average content of 78% nickel, 1%-2% cobalt, and 20%-21% sulphur. Total sales of nickel matte in 2023 were US$1,232 million.
