= Kalgoorlie Nickel Smelter =

Smelter in Western Australia

- Built: 1971–73
- Operated: 1973–2024
- Location: Feysville, City of Kalgoorlie–Boulder, Western Australia
- Coordinates: 30.8736°S 121.4841°E
- Industry: Mining
- Products: Nickel
- Website: www.bhp.com

The Kalgoorlie Nickel Smelter is a nickel smelter in Feysville, south of the town of Kalgoorlie in Western Australia. The smelter is operated by BHP and part of its Nickel West operations. Having originally been built by WMC Resources, it changed ownership in 2005 when BHP acquired WMC.

== Operations ==
The Kalgoorlie smelter is part of BHP's Nickel West operations, which includes, apart from the Kalgoorlie smelter, the Leinster Nickel Mine, the Mount Keith Nickel Mine, the Kambalda Nickel Concentrator and the Kwinana Nickel Refinery.

== History ==
Soon after the discovery of nickel at Kambalda by WMC Resources, the company started to look into the feasibility of constructing a nickel smelter in Western Australia. A number of smelting methods were considered before WMC made the decision in 1970 to opt for the flash smelting method, developed by Finnish company Outokumpu.

A number of locations for the smelter were considered, Kambalda, Kwinana, Esperance in Western Australia and Port Pirie in South Australia, before Kalgoorlie was chosen. Kalgoorlie's proximity to nickel deposits, its existing infrastructure and an available work force, gold mining in the area experiencing a downturn at the time, were the main arguments for building the smelter there. As part of the decision, the Western Australian state government made land available for the smelter south of Kalgoorlie while WMC agreed to partly fund a narrow-gauge railway to Esperance. In return, WMC would receive special freight rates for its nickel ore on the Western Australian Government Railway system.

On 16 September 1980, Premier of Western Australia, David Brand, announced the upcoming construction of the smelter, something WMC declined to confirm at the time, stating that negotiations about the location were still ongoing. WMC itself announced the construction of the smelter on 4 November 1970, with a cost estimate of $30 million and a two year time frame for construction, and construction commenced in early 1971. The construction site was visited by Premier of Western Australia, John Tonkin, on 2 July 1971 and the smelter was ready for commissioning in December 1972. Its initial capacity was to annually process 200,000 tonnes of nickel concentrate at a grade of 10 percent to with the aim of producing 29,000 tonnes of nickel matte at a grade of 70 percent.

The official opening of the smelter took place on 7 April 1973 in the presence of the Prime Minister of Australia, Gough Whitlam, as well as John Tonkin. The Kalgoorlie Nickel Smelter was the first nickel smelter in Australia.

By mid-1973, the smelter operated at a two-thirds capacity, suffering start-up problems, being only the second nickel smelter constructed of this design. A partial rebricking of the flash furnace was required after just 10 month. The original flash furnace was replaced with a larger one, with a 450,000 tonne capacity, in late 1978 and the old one decommissioned, having been consistently run at capacity. Reliability improved after this, to a point where no rebricking was required for almost 12 years from 1981 to 1993.

The larger capacity of the smelter allowed for toll-processing of nickel ore from the non-WMC Agnew Mine from 1978, a mine WMC eventually acquired a decade later. When mining ceased at Agnew in 1986, throughput of the smelter was negatively affected, one reason WMC opted to purchase and reopen the mine.

In June 1988, the smelter achieved the milestone of having processed five million tonnes of nickel concentrate and, in 1990–91, it achieved a record throughput of 537,758 tonnes. This record was eventually broken in 1995–96 when a new furnace processed 626,100 tonnes. The construction of the new furnace was announced in September 1991 and was to have an annual capacity of 750,000 tonnes in order to produce 65,000 tonnes of nickel concentrate. The old furnace was decommissioned on 8 September 1993 and the new constructed in its place in 70 days, officially opening on 15 December 1993 in the presence of the Western Australian premier Richard Court.

In 2005, WMC Resources was acquired by BHP, which bundled WMC's nickel assets under its Nickel West brand, which became the largest nickel producer in the state, producing a combined 67,000 tonnes out of the 180,000 tonnes produced in Western Australia in 2004–05. At the time of the WMC acquisition by BHP, the smelter employed over 900 people.

BHP closed the smelter for four month from June 2008 to carry out repairs, thereby reducing annual nickel production in Western Australia by 20,000 tonnes. The smelter was once more shut down for maintenance in October 2015, this time for 21 days, which reduced the state's nickel output by 7,000 tonnes for the year, at a time of decreasing volumes of nickel mining in Western Australia and a decreasing global nickel price.

At the time, 2015, BHP also looked at the future of its nickel operations, planning to expand the operational life to at least 2032. Among these, a rebuild of the kalgoorlie smelter in 2023 was proposed, which was estimated to have cost A$150 million and would extend the operational life of the smelter to 2040.

Nickel production in Western Australia increased again by 2017 but a fire at the smelter in September 2018 reduced production figures for Nickel West once more.

In 2021–22, BHP signed an agreement with renewable energy provider TransAlta to build a solar farm and a battery storage system in the Northern Goldfields, designed to power the Kalgoorlie smelter, the Kwinana refinery and the Kambalda concentrator, the later having been in care and maintenance since 2018 but being recommissioned in May 2022.

The smelter underwent a lengthy shut down in late 2022 to conduct a $7.5 million upgrade which negatively affected BHP's annual nickel production.

In August 2023, BHP received permission to construct a 1,152-room FIFO camp for three years to accommodate workers for a rebuilt of the smelter which is scheduled to extend the life of the facility by 20 years.

Due to an oversupply of nickel and a consequent drop in nickel prices, BHP announced on 11 July 2024 that it would temporarily close all of its Nickel West operations in October 2024 and place them in care and maintenance. This decision is scheduled to be reviewed in February 2027 but BHP would continue to spend $450 million annually on its nickel operations to facilitate a potential restart. The decision was estimated to affect 300 workers at the smelter but BHP committed to offer all employees affected a redeployment or redundancy. The decision made the TransAlta 150 MW gas power generator available to the Kalgoorlie grid.
