= Kwinana Nickel Refinery =

Refinery in Western Australia

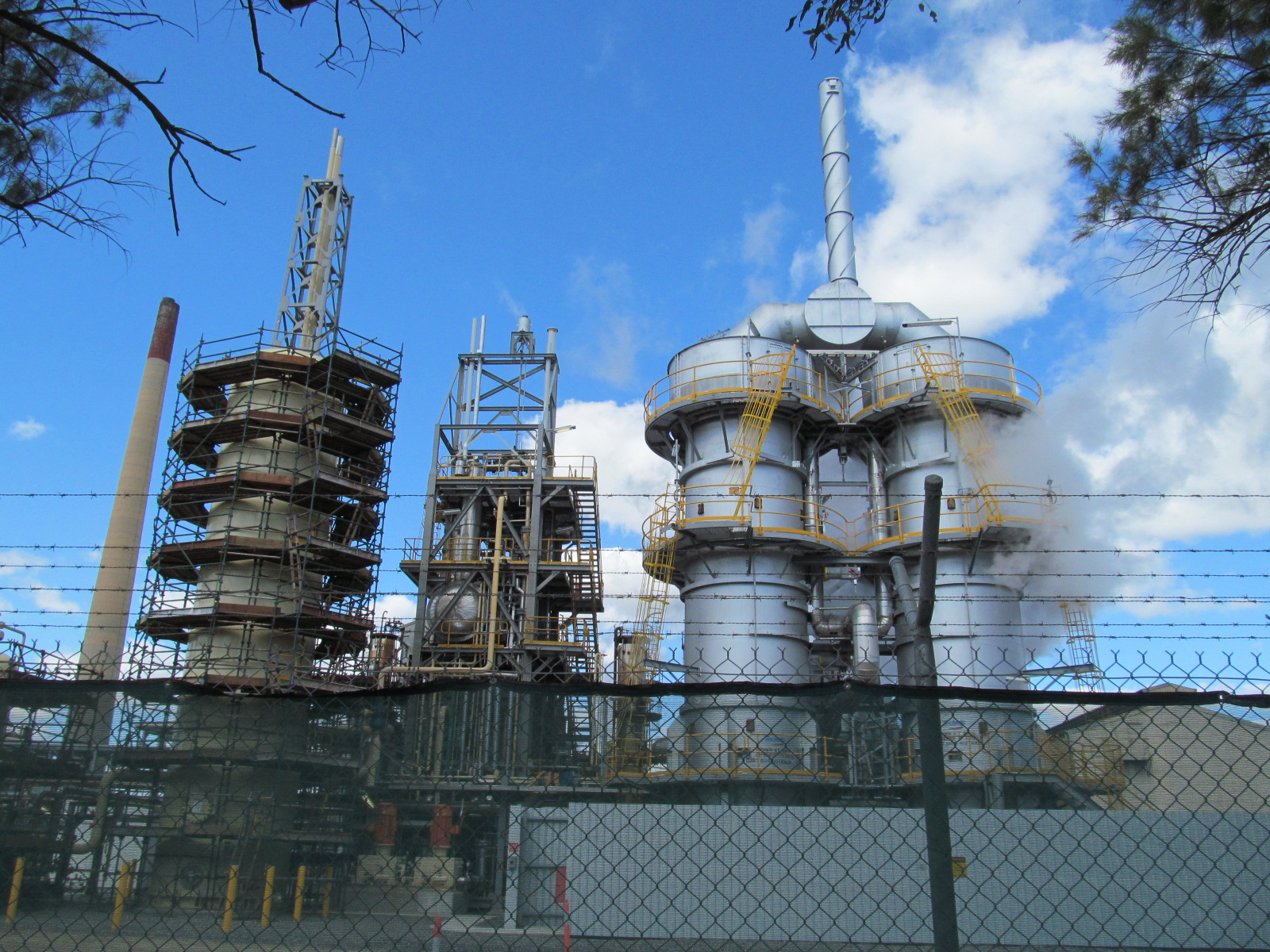
- The refinery in 2012
- Built: 1969–70
- Operated: 1970–2024
- Location: East Rockingham and Kwinana Beach, Western Australia
- Coordinates: 32°14′59″S 115°45′59″E
- Industry: Mining
- Products: Nickel
- Website: www.bhp.com

The Kwinana Nickel Refinery is a nickel refinery in East Rockingham and Kwinana Beach, Western Australia. The refinery is operated by BHP and part of its Nickel West operations. Having originally been built by WMC Resources, it changed ownership in 2005 when BHP acquired WMC.

== Operations ==
Kwinana is part of BHP's Nickel West operations, which includes, apart from Kwinana, the Leinster Nickel Mine, the Mount Keith Nickel Mine, the Kambalda Nickel Concentrator and the Kalgoorlie Nickel Smelter.

At Kwinana, nickel matte is refined into nickel powder and briquettes at a grade of 99.8 percent nickel.

In late 2021, a nickel sulphate plant opened at the refinery, the first in Australia. Nickel sulphate is a key component of lithium-ion batteries, which are used to power electric vehicles.

== History ==
Soon after developing its Kambalda nickel deposit, the Western Mining Corporation (WMC), started looking into the possibility of producing refined nickel. The company decided to use the Sherritt Gordon hydrometallurgical ammonia-leach process for this purpose and selected Kwinana as the location for its new refinery, based on the availability of power and water supply, raw materials and the location in the Perth metropolitan region.

The design process of the refinery commenced in 1967, and the refinery was commissioned in May 1970. During the construction, the project was scheduled to employ 1,500 people while, during operation, it would employ 250 people. The construction cost was financed through a shares issue by WMC Resources. As part of the operational requirements of the refinery, the mining and milling facilities at Kambalda as well as the township had to be expanded. The company also had to acquire rolling stock to transport the ore from Kambalda to Kwinana. At this point, the Kalgoorlie smelter was also already in planning but no decision on its construction and location, Kambalda or Kalgoorlie, had been made.

Initial annual capacity of the facility was 15 thousand tonnes (33 million pounds) of nickel powder, produced from nickel concentrate. The official opening of the refinery took place on 15 September 1970 and was performed by the Premier of Western Australia, David Brand. As part of the opening, WMC endowed the Murdoch University with a chair for environmental studies. Construction of the new facility cost $40 million and the first shipment of nickel left the site on 29 May 1970.

With the opening of the Kalgoorlie Nickel Smelter in 1972, production at the refinery increased as the former's 70 percent nickel matte gradually supplanted the 12 percent nickel concentrate from the Kambalda Nickel Smelter. Processing of concentrate was eventually stopped altogether by 1986. At this point, the refinery had expanded to an annual capacity of 30 thousand tonnes (66 million pounds) of nickel. In the late 1980s, the refinery had a Carbon in pulp plant added which allowed it to produce 398 kilograms (12,810 ozt) of gold from refinery residues in the following years until the gold content declined to a point were running the plant was uneconomically and it was dismantled.

Reduced production from the Kalgoorlie smelter and lesser global demand led the refinery to switch to a campaign-style mode from 1989 to 1991. Once full production was resumed the refinery exceeded 30 thousand tonnes (66 million pounds) of refined nickel per annum for the first time. In September 1991, a $50 million upgrade of the refinery was announced in an attempt to upsize the Western Australian nickel operations and make WMC the world's number two nickel producer. WMC was aiming to increase production to 90 thousand tonnes (200 million pounds) per annum by 1995, of which half was to be refined nickel, with Kwinana's output to be expanded to 42 thousand tonnes (93 million pounds). Alongside the Kwinana expansion, $127 million were spent on the expansion of the Leinster Nickel Mine as well as a planned $230 million to be spent at Kambalda and Kalgoorlie. WMC had, prior to this, explored the prospect of finding refinery capacity outside of Australia, concerned by high gas prices, but dropped these plans when the Western Australian government made some concessions on the royalty payments of the company.

By 1998, the refinery produced 53.7 thousand tonnes (118 million pounds) per year. In 2005, WMC Resources was acquired by BHP, which bundled WMC's nickel assets under its Nickel West brand, which became the largest nickel producer in the state, producing a combined 67 thousand tonnes (150 million pounds) out of the 180 thousand tonnes (400 million pounds) produced in Western Australia in 2004–05. At the time of the WMC acquisition by BHP, the refinery employed 454 people.

In 2021–22, BHP signed an agreement with renewable energy provider TransAlta to build a solar farm and a battery storage system in the Northern Goldfields, designed to power the Kalgoorlie smelter, the Kwinana refinery and the Kambalda concentrator, the later having been in care and maintenance since 2018 but being recommissioned in May 2022.

Due to an oversupply of nickel and a consequent drop in nickel prices, BHP announced on 11 July 2024 that it would temporarily close all of its Nickel West operations in October 2024 and place them in care and maintenance. This decision is scheduled to be reviewed in February 2027 but BHP would continue to spend $450 million annually on its nickel operations to facilitate a potential restart. The decision was estimated to affect 1,600 workers and the mines and smelters but BHP committed to offer all employees affected a redeployment or redundancy.

== Environmental issues ==
In the early days of the refinery, the suburb of Kwinana Beach was still partially residential and the operations received frequent complaints about air pollution from the refinery, which eventually ceased when the state government of Western Australia removed all residences and the suburb became purely industrial.

The refinery also established a tailings disposal area at Baldivis, which also received complaints from a local neighbour, a problem that WMC solved by buying them out. Of greater concern was seepage from the tailings into the ground water, which posed a direct thread to the near-by Lake Cooloongup. Eventually, the solution selected to solve this problem was to transport the tailings back to Kambalda and store them there.

== Fatalities ==
On 9 June 1978, two employees were killed at the refinery, J. W. Bell and S. J. Haywood. Bell collapsed in a hazardous environment in a convertor vessel due to what is presumed to have been a faulty seal on his face mask. Haywood attempted to assist him and both died of asphyxiation, inhaling nitrogen gas.
