= Murrin Murrin Mine =

Mine in Western Australia

Murrin Murrin
- Location in Western Australia
- Interactive map of Murrin Murrin
- Location: Leonora, Western Australia, Australia; 28°46′03″S 121°53′38″E
- Products: Nickel, cobalt
- Production: Nickel: 31,100 t Cobalt: 2,100 t
- Financial year: 2023
- Opened: 1999
- Company: Glencore
- Website: www.glencore.com.au
- Acquired: 2011

The Murrin Murrin Mine is a major nickel-cobalt mining operation being conducted in the North Eastern Goldfields, approximately 45 km east of Leonora, Western Australia. The project was initiated as a 60/40 joint venture between Murrin Murrin Holdings, a subsidiary of Anaconda Nickel and Glenmurrin, a subsidiary of Glencore. In 2003 Anaconda changed its name to Minara Resources. In November 2011, Minara Resources was acquired by Glencore. The mine opened in 1999.

== Geology ==
Murrin Murrin mines a laterite nickel ore formed by deep weathering of a peridotite ultramafic rock.

== Problems with the process plant ==
Significant problems and delays were encountered in the design, construction and commissioning of the ore process plant at Murrin Murrin.

The designers, Fluor Daniel eventually had to pay the joint venture partners $155 million in an out-of-court settlement. It was the second successful claim against Fluor, Murrin Murrin owners having been awarded $147 million from the first phase of their claim against Fluor, a sum which ultimately was reduced to $39.8 million. The Murrin Murrin project's original cost estimate of $1 billion had $1.6 billion. In December 1998, Anaconda Nickel terminated Henry Walker as mining contractor.

== Production ==
Production of the mine:

Year	Nickel	Cobalt
2000	13,027 t	904 t
2001	25,991 t	1,253 t
2002	30,009 t	1,838 t
2003	28,147 t	2,309 t
2004	27,950 t	1,982 t
2005	28,240 t	1,750 t
2006	31,524 t	2,096 t
2007	27,585 t	1,884 t
2008	30,514 t	2,018 t
2009	32,977 t	3,250 t
2010	28,500 t	1,900 t
2011	28,500 t	1,900 t
2012	33,410 t	2,390 t
2013	40,000 t	2,700 t
2014	36,400 t	2,700 t
2015	37,500 t	2,800t
2016	35,300 t	2,800 t
2017	34,700 t	2,700 t
2018	35,500 t	2,900 t
2019	37,000t	3,400 t
2020	36,000 t	2,900 t
2021	30,000 t	2,500 t
2022	35,700 t	3,000 t
2023	31,100 t	2,100 t
