= Kambalda Nickel Operations =

Nickel mine in Western Australia

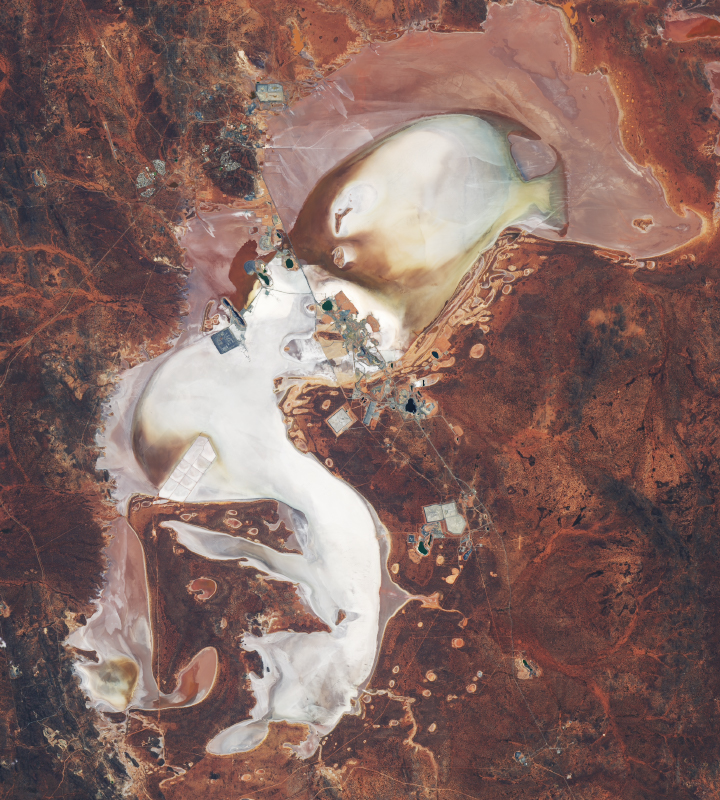
- Satellite image of Lake Lefroy, with the Kambalda Nickel Operations on the north-western shore

- Location in Western Australia
- Interactive map of Kambalda Nickel Operations
- Location: Kambalda East, Western Australia, Australia; 31°11′08″S 121°40′23″E
- Products: Nickel
- Production: 1,404 tonnes
- Financial year: 2021–22
- Opened: 1967
- Active: 1967–2003 (WMC) 2002–2016 (Mincor) 2022–present (Mincor, Wyloo Metals)
- Company: BHP (Concentrator) Wyloo Metals (Mining leases)
- Website: BHP website Wyloo Metals website
- Acquired: 2023 (Wyloo Metals) June 2005 (BHP)

Kambalda Nickel Operations or Kambalda Nickel Mine is a surface and underground nickel mine as well as a nickel concentrator, near Kambalda East, Western Australia. The deposit was discovered in 1954 and the mine opened in 1967, operated by WMC Resources which was taken over by BHP in 2005. Prior to this, between 2001 and 2003, WMC ceased mining operations at Kambalda and divested itself of the mining assets.

BHP, through its Nickel West operations, continues to operate the Kambalda Nickel Concentrator, with the facility having been shut down from 2018 to 2022. The mining leases were predominantly with Mincor Resources which had intermittently mined the former WMC workings. In 2023, Wyloo Metals acquired Mincor Resources.

Kambalda was the first nickel mine in Western Australia. The mine also caused an international dispute between Singapore and Australia over nuclear waste disposal when a caesium-137 density gauge lost at Kambalda contaminated a furnace in Singapore in 1978.

== History ==
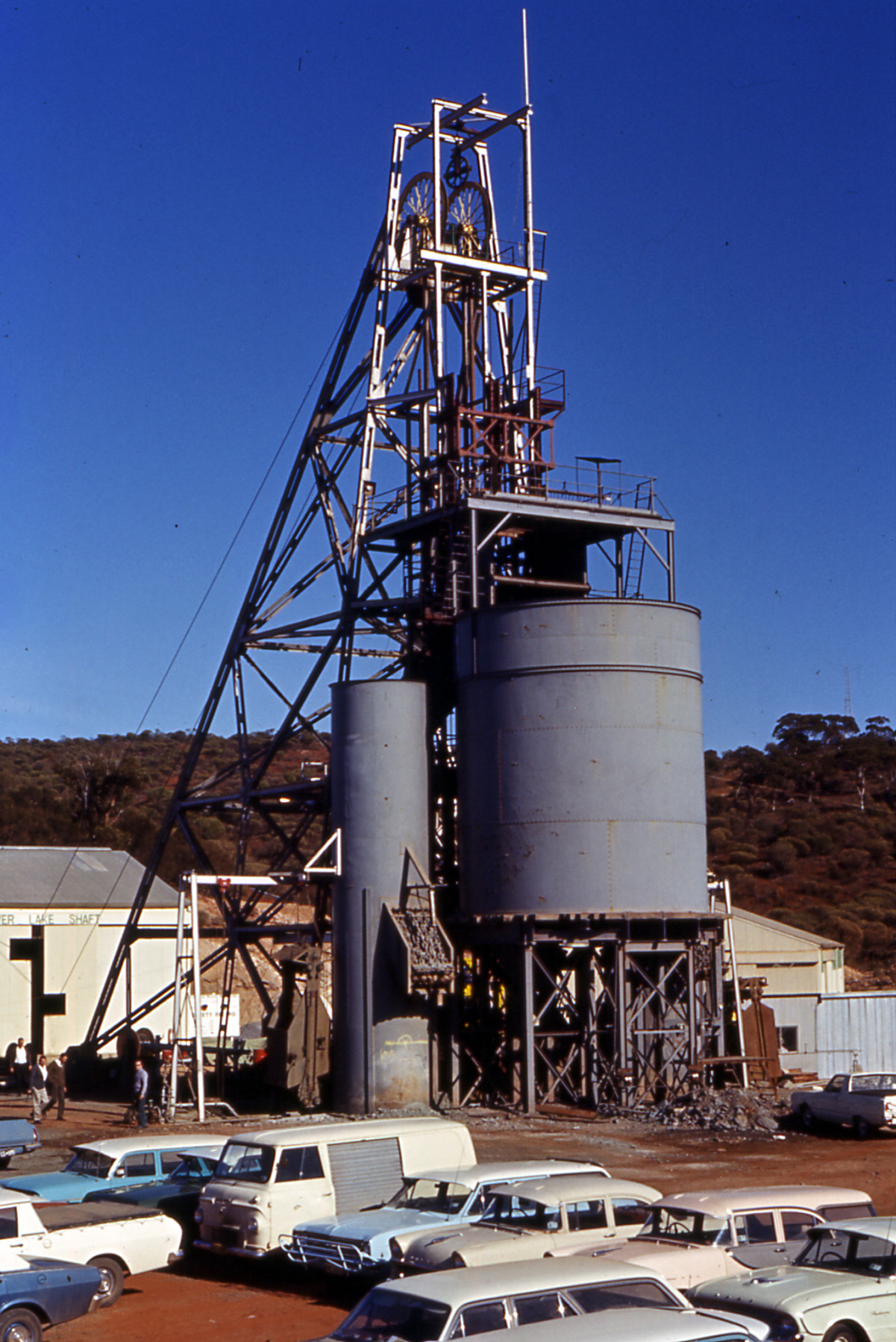
WMC's Silver Lake shaft in 1969

Up until the mid-1960s, nickel was not listed as a major commodity in the annual reports of the Department of Mines and received little attention in annual publications. This changed in 1966, when the report described the discovery of high-grade nickel ore at Kambalda as a "momentous event", while the 1967 report hailed it as "marking another important mineral development in Western Australia".

WMC Resources had carried out sporadic nickel exploration in the 1950s, but soon decided to turn their attention to other minerals. The discovery of nickel at Kambalda dates back to 1954, when, at the former Red Hill Gold Mine, nickel was discovered during uranium exploration. The discovery aroused no interest for another decade until the information was passed on to the Western Mining geology department in 1964. Eventually, a drilling program was carried out that intercepted high-grade nickel at a depth of 133 metres on 28 January 1966. The discovery was officially announced on 21 February 1966.

On the bases of a global nickel shortage, WMC immediately proceeded with the development of the mine and a shaft was sunk at the shore of Lake Lefroy. To save costs and to speed up development, equipment was sourced from other mines and, by June 1967, a 155 metre shaft had been sunk. A competition was held to name the new shaft, with the name "Silver Lake" chosen, suggested by Mary Norman, wife of the Services Officer.

Construction of the concentrator plant with a name plate capacity of 130,000 tonnes per annum progressed rapidly, with production of nickel concentrate commencing in June 1967. The nickel concentrate was sent by road to Widgiemooltha and, from there, by rail to Esperance, where it was loaded on to ships. The official opening of the operations took place on 15 September 1967 in the presence of the Premier of Western Australia, David Brand. The construction cost of the mine at this point stood at $5.9 million.

Further nickel discoveries in the area allowed for an expansion of the operation as well as the concentrator, which reached an annual capacity of 1.4 million tonnes by 1972. The town constructed to serve as residence for the mine workers, Kambalda East, was soon restricted in growth by further ore discoveries and a second town was established further west, Kambalda West. Kambalda East's location was actually the proposed site for the township of the original Red Hill Gold Mine.

The operational success at Kambalda allowed WMC to subsequently build the Kwinana Nickel Refinery and the Kalgoorlie Nickel Smelter in the following years to further process the Kambalda ore. By the mid-1970s however, nickel sales declined, as did the company's profits, and some of the work force at Kambalda had to be laid off. Despite this, production and stockpiles increased, which only reduced again when the nickel market recovered from 1979 onwards. By 1983, Durkin was the first of the nickel shafts to have to be closed down, having been mined out.

In 1974, gold was discovered in one of the nickel shafts, which ultimately led to WMC establishing the St Ives Gold Mine, south-east of Kambalda. For a time, in the early 1980s, the Kambalda Nickel Concentrator had gravity circuit added, which allowed for the recovery of gold. The gold production during another nickel downturn in the 1980s helped the town of Kambalda through this era.

In 1986, during a nickel downturn, the original Silver Lake Shaft was closed, down, Australia's first nickel mine. In late 1987, nickel prices rebounded but production at Kambalda declined because of industrial actions, lack of forward planning because of the need of cost savings and lower grades. Industrial action mainly evolved from the plan to permit seven-day around-the-clock mining, which the unions opposed but the state government supported. When WMC threatened, however, to scrap a $105 million expansion at Kambalda, the state government responded by threatening to withdraw its support.

In June 1992, the Kambalda concentrator reached the milestone of 30 million processed tonnes, with 930,000 tonnes of nickel contained in it. At this point, operations began to turn around and production to increase, with the operation having its name changed to Kambalda Nickel Mines, while the gold operations became St Ives Gold Mines.

The Kwinana refinery had originally established a tailings disposal area at Baldivis. Of great concern was seepage from the tailings into the ground water, which posed a direct thread to the near-by Lake Cooloongup. Eventually, the solution selected to solve this problem was to transport the tailings back to Kambalda and store them there.

By 2000, WMC started to divest some of the Kambalda assets and, in 2003, ceased mining operations there while continuing to operate the Kambalda concentrator. The largest sale of assets at Kambalda took place in November 2000, when a group consisting of Mincor Resources, Clough Mining and Donegal Resources purchased four of the seven available assets for $38 million.

The Kambalda concentrator subsequently was used to treat third-party ore from divested former WMC operations around Kambalda, like the Blair open pit and underground operations by the Australian Mines company, and new nickel deposits in the area.

By 2007, 40 years after the opening of the Western Australia's first nickel mine at Kambalda, nickel in the state had become a $8 billion industry.

In 2018, BHP planned to convert the concentrator at Kambalda into a gold plant after the last supplier of toll-treated ore, the Long nickel mine, ceased operations, with two other suppliers having closed their operations earlier. The plan did not eventualise as no gold supplier for the plant could be found and the concentrator was therefore placed in care and maintenance.

In 2021–22, BHP signed an agreement with renewable energy provider TransAlta to build a solar farm and a battery storage system in the Northern Goldfields, designed to power the Kalgoorlie smelter, the Kwinana refinery and the Kambalda concentrator, the later having been in care and maintenance since 2018 but being recommissioned in May 2022 to process ore from Mincor's w Cassini mine.

The mining leases are predominantly with Mincor Resources which has intermittently mined the former WMC workings but also holds tenements with new discoveries. Mincor resources continued mining the former WMC assets for a period of 14 years until low nickel prices in 2016 forced the company to place the mine in care and maintenance. During this time, the company produced 180,000 tonnes of nickel-in-ore from Kambalda workings. Mincor resumed mining nickel in May 2022, now from a new deposit, the Cassini mine, 70 km south of Kambalda, and its Northern Operations, located within former WMC workings.

In 2023, Andrew Forrest-backed Wyloo Metals took over Mincor Resources in a $760 million deal, with the latter suffering from cash flow problems and being unsure as to whether it would be able repay its dept. In January 2024 it was announced that the mine would be placed into care and maintenance by May because of falling nickel prices. This decision was followed by an announcement by BHP that the Kampalda Nickel Concentraor would go into care and maintenance in June 2024.

== Open source incident ==
On 14 November 1978, a density gauge at the Kambalda mill was discovered to be missing. The gauge, which contained caesium-137, had been removed for recalibration.

Shortly afterwards, National Iron and Steel Mills (NISM) in Singapore informed Sims Consolidated that one of their furnaces had been contaminated with caesium-137. Sims, who had transported a cargo of scrap metal from Kambalda, was held responsible by NISM, but Sims in turn held WMC responsible for the contamination.

The resident manager at Kambalda, Barry Paterson, was charged and fined $100 in May 1979 over the incident for breaches of the Radiation Safety Act. The incident however made national news initially and, again, when the issue became an international matter between the Australian and Singaporean governments in September 1979.

The issue arose over 119 drums of slightly contaminated waste, holding bricks and sludge from the Singapore furnace, which Singapore demanded that Australia accept and dispose of. Both WMC and Sims lobbied the Australian government to permit the waste to be removed from Singapore to Western Australia, and permission was granted in 1981.

Arranging shipping for the waste proved difficult and its potential arrival in Western Australia led to protests, strikes and demonstrations. The original plan, to store the waste in a shed in Kambalda, was subsequently abandoned after a strike action at the WMC mines and, instead, a concrete bunker outside of Kambalda was selected for storage. The waste was eventually transported by ship, the Cape Comorin, as its only cargo and destined to be unloaded in Geraldton. This led to protest by the local dock workers who demanded the ship to be unloaded in Fremantle, where the scrap metal had originally been shipped from, but it was closed because of strike action at the time. Instead, the ship had to continue on to Esperance, where it arrived on 7 December 1981. From there, the waste was transported to Kambalda, where it arrived the following day, and was buried in the designated bunker.

The bulk carrier Cape Comorin subsequently was not allowed to dock in the Port of Melbourne until clearance of all radioactive contamination was established.

== Railway ==
The West Kambalda Railway Act 1972, an act by the Parliament of Western Australia granted assent on 9 June 1972, authorised the construction by the Western Australian Government Railways of a 8 kilometres (5.0 mi) spur railway line from the Esperance railway line at Kambalda West to the Kambalda nickel concentrator. This spur line is now part of the Arc Infrastructure network.

== See also ==
- Western Australian radioactive capsule incident
