= WMC Resources =

Former Australian mining and fertiliser company

- Formerly: Western Mining Corporation
- Traded as: ASX: WMR
- Industry: Mining
- Founded: 1933
- Founder: William Robinson
- Defunct: 2005
- Headquarters: Melbourne, Australia
- Key people: Tommie Bergman (Chairman); Andrew Michelmore (Managing Director)
- Products: Nickel, copper, uranium oxide, phosphate fertiliser
- Revenue: $4.0 billion (2004)
- Net income: $1.0 billion (2004)
- Website: www.wmc.com

WMC Resources Limited was an Australian diversified mining company.

== History ==
Western Mining Corporation (WMC) was formed in 1933, when William Robinson, the Australian-born London-based managing director of Broken Hill Associated Smelters, was able to interest several large London-based mining companies into forming syndicates to develop gold mines in Australia. WMC's strategy was to use the newly emerging sciences of mining geology and related geochemistry and geophysics to find new gold deposits. It was a company based on the idea that if they applied good science to exploration, they would be successful.

WMC began operations in Western Australia in December 1933 when it commenced an extensive aerial survey of the Eastern Goldfields. It acquired its first profitable mining operation in June 1935 when it took an option over a new gold discovery at Cox's Find, 43 miles northwest of Laverton.

WMC pioneered district-scale aerial photography in the 1930s, flying many areas in West Australia's gold-mining districts. The hope was to identify new prospective areas near known mines. Unfortunately, the surveys failed due to poor exposures of the rocks in the nearly flat, deeply-weathered areas they flew.

In 1961, WMC acquired a 20% shareholding in Alcoa World Alumina & Chemicals that later increased to 40%.

The company's final corporate structure before takeover was formed in 2002 by a demerger that split off the aluminium operations to form Alumina, separate from what was to be known as WMC Resources Limited.

== Takeover bids ==
In December 2004, Xstrata announced a takeover offer for the company. In February 2005, the WMC board recommended that shareholders reject the offer. The Australian Competition & Consumer Commission and Foreign Investment Review Board both approved the deal, however a number of people (including members of the Government) expressed concerns due to the economic (and strategic) importance of the Olympic Dam mine resources, and the reputation of Xstrata and its major shareholder, Glencore.

The Xstrata takeover offer lapsed after a higher offer was made by BHP Billiton, with support from the WMC Resources board. When the offer closed 3 June 2005, BHP Billiton held 55% of the WMC's shares. Under the Corporations Act 2001 this automatically extended the offer period by another 14 days. On 17 June 2005, BHP Billiton announced that it had achieved 90.5% ownership, and would proceed to compulsorily acquire the remaining shares. It was delisted from the Australian Securities Exchange on 29 June 2005.

The company name was later subsumed by the BHP Billiton corporate identity, and a significant name in Australian mining history ceased to be used.

== Operations ==
When it was taken over it had three main businesses:

- Mount Keith and Leinster Nickel Mines, Kambalda Nickel Concentrator, Kalgoorlie Nickel Smelter and Kwinana Nickel Refinery, all in Western Australia
- Olympic Dam mine copper-uranium-gold mine in South Australia. In 2005, this mine was estimated to contain 33% of the world's known uranium reserves.
- The Phosphate Hill mine and associated phosphate fertiliser production business in Queensland, which became known as Southern Cross Fertilisers following the BHP Billiton takeover; and Hi Fert, a blending and distribution network supporting Australia's eastern states. BHP Billiton sold Hi Fert to a joint venture of Elders and AWB in December 2005 and Southern Cross Fertilisers to Incitec Pivot in May 2006.

=== Former ===
- Agnew Gold Mine
- Beta Hunt Mine
- Burbanks Gold Mine
- Hill 50 Gold Mine
- Nifty Copper Mine
- Norseman Gold Mine
- St Ives Gold Mine
- Three Springs Mine
