= List of active gold mines in Western Australia =

- Position of Western Australia within Australia

Location
- State: Western Australia
- Country: Australia

Regulatory authority
- Authority: Department of Mines, Petroleum & Exploration
- Website: http://www.dmp.wa.gov.au/index.aspx

Production
- Commodity: Gold
- Production: ▲6.9 million troy ounces (214 tonnes)
- Value: ▲ A$17 billion
- Employees: ▲36,087
- Year: 2021–22

In the state of Western Australia, gold is the third largest commodity sector, behind iron ore and LNG, with a value of A$17 billion in 2021–22. The 6.9 million troy ounces (214 tonnes) sold during this time period was the highest amount in 20 years and accounted for almost 70 percent of all gold sold in Australia. Western Australia, in 2021–22, produced 69 percent of all gold produced in Australia, with the country accounting for ten percent of the world's gold production in this time period.

In 2021–22, Western Australian gold mining employed 36,087 people.

During 2021–22, the gold price reached a new record peak of over US$2000 per ounce in early 2022, before settling lower again.

Major gold mining locations in Western Australia with Perth and Port Hedland as references

== List of active mines ==
This is a list of major active gold mines in Western Australia in 2022–23, according to the Department of Mines, Industry Regulation and Safety. To qualify for the department's official list of principal mining projects an operation has to either had mineral sales valued at more than $5 million (or more than 2,500 oz of gold), or, for operations where such figures are not reported, had a minimum of 50 employees:

Mine	Owner	Location	Region	Production (troy ounces)	Period ^{[1]}	Source
Agnew Gold Mine	Gold Fields	Leinster	Goldfields-Esperance	244,900	2023	
Beta Hunt Mine	Karora Resources	Kambalda	Goldfields-Esperance	79,125	2022	
Boddington Gold Mine	Newmont	Boddington	Peel	745,000^{[12]}	2023	
Carosue Dam Gold Mine	Northern Star Resources	Laverton	Goldfields-Esperance	243,246	2022–23	
Cue Gold Operation	Westgold	Cue	Mid-West	203,000^{[10]}	2022–23	
Daisy Milano Gold Mine	Silver Lake Resources	Kalgoorlie	Goldfields-Esperance	95,559^{[3]}	2022–23	
Darlot-Centenary Gold Mine	Red 5 Limited	Darlot	Goldfields-Esperance	102,574^{[16]}	2022–23	
Davyhurst Gold Mine	Ora Banda Mining	Davyhurst	Goldfields-Esperance	48,023	2022–23	
Deflector Gold Mine	Silver Lake Resources	Gullewa	Mid-West	127,069	2022–23	
Duketon Gold Project	Regis Resources	Bandya	Goldfields-Esperance	329,000^{[11]}	2022–23	
Edna May Gold Mine	Ramelius Resources	Westonia	Wheatbelt	113,053^{[7]}	2022–23	
Fortnum Gold Mine	Westgold	Peak Hill	Mid-West	53,735	2022–23	
Frog's Leg Gold Mine	Evolution Mining	Kalgoorlie	Goldfields-Esperance	135,592^{[13]}	2022–23	
Golden Grove Mine	29Metals Limited	Yalgoo	Mid West	14,000^{[17]}	2023	
Granny Smith Gold Mine	Gold Fields	Laverton	Goldfields-Esperance	283,900	2023	
Gruyere Gold Mine	Gold Road Resources (50%); Gold Fields (50%)	Laverton	Goldfields-Esperance	322,000	2023	
Gwalia Gold Mine	Genesis Minerals Limited	Leonora	Goldfields-Esperance	138,050	2022–23	
Higginsville Gold Mine	Karora Resources	Higginsville	Goldfields-Esperance	54,763	2022	
Jaurdi Gold Mine	Beacon Minerals Limited	Coolgardie	Goldfields-Esperance	29,110	2022–23	
Jundee Gold Mine	Northern Star Resources	Wiluna	Mid West	320,201^{[4]}	2022–23	
Kalgoorlie Consolidated Gold Mines	Northern Star Resources	Kalgoorlie	Goldfields-Esperance	432,001	2022–23	
Karlawinda Gold Project	Capricorn Metals	Newman	Pilbara	120,014	2022–23	
Kanowna Belle Gold Mine	Northern Star Resources	Kalgoorlie	Goldfields-Esperance	163,679^{[8]}	2022–23	
King of the Hills Gold Mine^{[6]}	Red 5 Limited	Leonora	Goldfields-Esperance	102,574^{[16]}	2022–23	
Kundana Gold Mine	Evolution Mining	Kalgoorlie	Goldfields-Esperance	135,592^{[13]}	2022–23	
Marvel Loch Gold Mine	Barto Gold Mining	Marvel Loch	Wheatbelt	Undisclosed	2022	
Meekatharra Gold Operation	Westgold	Meekatharra	Mid-West	203,000^{[10]}	2022–23	
Mount Magnet	Ramelius Resources	Mount Magnet	Mid-West	127,943^{[9]}	2022–23	
Mount Monger operations	Silver Lake Resources	Kalgoorlie	Goldfields-Esperance	95,559^{[3]}	2022–23	
Norseman Gold Mine	Pantoro Limited	Norseman	Goldfields-Esperance	24,520	2022–23	
Paddington Gold Mine	Norton Gold Fields Limited	Kalgoorlie	Goldfields-Esperance	177,000	2022	
Plutonic Gold Mine	Catalyst Metals Limited	Meekatharra	Mid West	62,336	2022	
Second Fortune Gold Mine	Linden Gold Alliance	Kookynie	Goldfields-Esperance	Undisclosed^{[15]}	2020–21	
St Ives Gold Mine	Gold Fields	Kambalda	Goldfields-Esperance	371,800	2023	
South Kalgoorlie Gold Mine	Northern Star Resources	Kalgoorlie	Goldfields-Esperance	163,679^{[8]}	2022–23	
Sunrise Dam Gold Mine	AngloGold Ashanti	Laverton	Goldfields-Esperance	232,000	2022	
Telfer Mine	Newmont	Telfer	Pilbara	349,000^{[2]}	2022–23	
Thunderbox Gold Mine	Northern Star Resources	Leinster	Goldfields-Esperance	159,782^{[4]}	2022–23	
Tropicana Gold Mine	AngloGold Ashanti (70%); Regis Resources (30%)	Great Victoria Desert	Goldfields-Esperance	306,000	2022	
White Foil Gold Mine	Evolution Mining	Kalgoorlie	Goldfields-Esperance	135,592^{[13]}	2022–23	

=== Notes ===
- ^[1]Some companies work on calendar year (2021) (mostly non-Australian companies), others on fiscal year (2020–21)
- ^[2]Also produced 17,000 tonnes of copper and 208,000 ounces of silver in 2022–23
- ^[3]Production figure is for the combined Mount Monger Operations, which consist of the Daisy Milano and Mount Belches underground and Aldiss open pit operations.
- ^[4]Production figure is for the combined Bronzewing and Thunderbox mines of the Yandal Production Centre, while the Jundee Gold Mine, also part of the operation, was reported separately.
- ^[5]Production at the mine temporarily resumed in 2021–22 for trial mining.
- ^[6]Formerly called Tarmoola Gold Mine.
- ^[7]Edna May Gold Mine operation includes the Marda & Tampia Gold Mines, from where ore is hauled to and processed at Edna May
- ^[8]Production figure is for the combined Northern Star Resources Kalgoorlie Operations, which consist of the South Kalgoorlie Gold Mine and Kanowna Belle Gold Mine. The Kundana Gold Mine and the East Kundana Joint Venture (51 percent Northern Star Resources ownership) were also part of the Kalgoorlie Operations until sold in July 2021.
- ^[9]Mount Magnet Gold Mine operation includes the Vivien Gold Mine, from where ore is hauled to and processed at Mount Magnet
- ^[10]Combined result for the Murchison Operations consisted of the Meekatharra Gold Operation and the Cue Gold Operation. The Meekatharra Gold Operation consists of the Paddy's Flat, South Emu-Triton and Bluebird underground mines and the surface operations at Five Mile Well, Maid Marion, Albury Heath and Aladdin open pits. The Cue Gold Operation consists of the Big Bell underground mine as its primary producer, supplemented by the Comet underground mine.
- ^[11]The Duketon Gold Project consists of the Duketon South Operations, comprising the Garden Well and Rosemont processing facilities, and the Duketon North Operations, comprising the Moolart Well processing facility
- ^[12]Also produced 98 million pounds (44,450 tonnes) of copper in 2023
- ^[13]Combined production for the Mungari Operation, which consist of the Frog's Leg Gold Mine and the White Foil Gold Mine. Additionally to this, the Kundana and East Kundana underground operations were added to the Mungari Operation in 2021
- ^[14]Achieved from trial mining and subsequent treatment at the third-party Lakewood processing plant
- ^[15]Ore toll-treated at the St Barbara Limited Gwalia processing plant
- ^[16]Combined production figure for King of the Hills and Darlot
- ^[17]The Golden Grove Mine also produced 51,500 tonnes of zinc, 18,100 tonnes of copper, 1,170 tonnes of lead and 775,000 ounces of silver in 2023

== List of mines in care and maintenance ==
This is a list of gold mines in Western Australia that are currently under care and maintenance, with an existing process plant registered on their relevant Minedex entry:

Mine	Owner	Location	Region	Production (troy ounces)	Last production period ^{[1]}	Source
Andy Well Gold Mine	Meeka Gold Limited	Meekatharra	Mid West	300,000	2013–17	
Boorara Gold Mine	Horizon Minerals	Boorara	Goldfields-Esperance	6,568^{[14]}	2020–21	
BrightStar Gold Mine	Brightstar Resources Limited	Laverton	Goldfields-Esperance	14,287	2010–11	
Bronzewing Gold Mine	Northern Star Resources	Wiluna	Mid West	48,792	July - December 2012	
Burbanks Gold Mine	Greenstone Resources	Coolgardie	Goldfields-Esperance	2,078 ^{[5]}	2021–22	
Burnakura Gold Mine	Monument Mining	Meekatharra	Mid West	2,641	2009	
Coolgardie Gold Mine	Focus Minerals	Coolgardie	Goldfields-Esperance	58,629	2012–13	
Coyote Gold Mine	Northern Star Resources	Tanami Desert	Kimberley	30,216	2012–13	
Dalgaranga Gold Mine	Gascoyne Resources	Daggar Hills	Mid-West	71,153	2021–22	
DeGrussa Mine	Sandfire Resources	Peak Hill	Mid-West	32,285^{[2]}	2021–22	
Gidgee Gold Mine	Horizon Gold	Sandstone	Mid West	42,000	2004	
Indee Gold Mine	De Grey Mining	Whim Creek	Pilbara		2008	
Kirkalocka Gold Mine	Adaman Resources	Mount Magnet	Mid West			
Laverton Gold Mine	Focus Minerals	Laverton	Goldfields-Esperance	81,191	2012–13	
Lawlers Gold Mine	Gold Fields	Leinster	Goldfields-Esperance		2013	
Mount Ida Gold Mine	Red Dirt Metals	Mount Ida	Goldfields-Esperance	1,646	2007–08	
Mount Morgans Gold Mine	Genesis Minerals Limited	Kalgoorlie	Goldfields-Esperance	90,809	2021–22	
Nicolsons Gold Mine	Pantoro Limited	Halls Creek	Kimberley	23,712	2022–23	
Nullagine Gold Project	Novo Resources	Nullagine	Pilbara	39,125	2022	
Paulsens Gold Mine	Northern Star Resources	Pannawonica	Pilbara	22,436	2017–18	
Red October Gold Mine	Matsa Resources	Laverton	Goldfields-Esperance	7,063	2019–20	
Sandstone Gold Mine	Aurumin Limited	Sandstone	Mid West	29,885	2009–10	
Wattle Dam Gold Mine	Maximus Resources	Kambalda	Goldfields-Esperance		2012	
Wiluna Gold Mine	Wiluna Mining Corporation	Wiluna	Mid West	41,986	2021–22	
Youanmi Gold Mine	Rox Resources (70%) Venus Metals Corporation (30%)	Youanmi	Mid West		1997	

=== Notes ===
- ^[1] Some companies work on Calendar year (2022) (mostly non-Australian companies), others on Fiscal year (2021–22)
- ^[2] The DeGrussa Mine also produced 67,740 tonnes of copper. The mine was placed into care and maintenance in late 2022

== See also ==
- Gold mining in Western Australia
- Regions of Western Australia
- Mineral fields of Western Australia
