= List of gold mines in Australia =

This list of gold mines in Australia is subsidiary to the list of mines article and lists working, defunct and planned mines in the country organised by state.

== New South Wales ==
- Cadia-Ridgeway Mine
- Mount Boppy Gold Mine
- Mount Drysdale Mine
- Northparkes
- Occidental Mine / New Occidental Mine
- Peak Mines
- Tomingley
- Cowal
- Hera

== Queensland ==
- Cracow
- Ernest Henry mine
- Kidston Gold Mine
- Mount Morgan Mine
- Pajingo
- Mt Carlton
- Ravenswood Gold

== South Australia ==
Mine	Owner	Location	Region	Production	Years active	notes
Barossa Goldfields	N/A	Near Williamstown	Adelaide Hills	778kg	1868–1930s	
Carrapateena	BHP	West of Lake Torrens	Far North	~4.25Mtpa	2019–present	
Challenger	Barton Gold	Northwest of Tarcoola	Far North	~1.2Moz	2001–2018	Under care and maintenance
Hillside	Rex Minerals	South of Ardrossan	Yorke Peninsula	0	Proposed	
Olympic Dam	BHP	North of Woomera	Far North		1998–present	
Perseverance	Barton Gold	Tarcoola	Far North		2017-2018	
Prominent Hill	BHP		Far North		2009–present	
Bird-in-Hand mine	Terramin Australia Ltd	Woodside	Adelaide Hills		1880–1889	Application to reopen mine in 2019

== Tasmania ==
- Henty Gold Mine
- Mount Dundas (Tasmania)
- Mount Jukes Mine sites
- Mount Read (Tasmania)
- Beaconsfield Gold Mine

== Victoria ==
- A1 gold mine
- Ballarat gold mine
- Central Deborah gold mine
- Costerfield Gold Mine
- Fosterville Gold Mine
- Stawell Gold Mine

== Western Australia ==
Mine	Owner	Location	Region	Production (troy ounces)	Period ^{[1]}	Source
Agnew Gold Mine	Gold Fields	Leinster	Goldfields-Esperance	192,100	(2008–09)	
Bellevue Gold Mine	Bellevue Gold	Leinster	Mid West	none	(2023)	
Beta Hunt Mine	RNC Minerals	Kambalda	Goldfields-Esperance	50,311	FY 2017-18	
Boddington Gold Mine	Newmont	Boddington	Peel	745,000	(2023) ^{[2]}	
BrightStar Gold Mine	A1 Minerals Limited	Laverton	Goldfields-Esperance	14,287	(2010–11) ^{[10]}	
Bronzewing Gold Mine	Navigator Resources Limited	Wiluna	Mid West	75,423	(2010–11) ^{[13]}	
Burbanks Gold Mine	Barra Resources Limited	Coolgardie	Goldfields-Esperance	17,840	(2006–07) ^{[3]}	
Carosue Dam Gold Mine	Saracen Mineral Holdings	Laverton	Goldfields-Esperance	111,163	(2010–11) ^{[5]}	
Coolgardie Gold Mine	Focus Minerals Limited	Coolgardie	Goldfields-Esperance	72,832	(2010–11)	
Coyote Gold Mine	Tanami Gold NL	Tanami Desert	Kimberley	47,960	(2009–10) ^{[6]}	
Daisy Milano Gold Mine	Silverlake Resources	Kalgoorlie	Goldfields-Esperance	66,671	(2009–10)	
Darlot-Centenary Gold Mine	Red 5 Ltd	Leonora	Goldfields-Esperance	352,000	(2009) ^{[7]}	
Edna May Gold Mine	Catalpa Resources	Westonia	Wheatbelt	none	(2009–10)	
Frog's Leg Gold Mine	La Mancha Resources (51%) Avoca Resources Limited (49%)	Kalgoorlie	Goldfields-Esperance	85,600	(2008–09) ^{[8]}	
Golden Grove Mine	Minerals and Metals Group	Mount Magnet	Mid West	47,755	(2008) ^{[9]}	
Granny Smith Gold Mine	Gold Fields	Laverton	Goldfields-Esperance	352,000	(2009) ^{[7]}	
Gwalia Gold Mine	St Barbara Limited	Leonora	Goldfields-Esperance	82,795	(2008–09)	
Higginsville Gold Mine	Avoca Resources Limited	Higginsville	Goldfields-Esperance	131,227	(2008–09)	
Jundee Gold Mine	Newmont	Wiluna	Mid West	412,300	(2009)	
Kalgoorlie Super Pit Gold Mine	Northern Star Resources (50%) Saracen Mineral (50%)	Kalgoorlie	Goldfields-Esperance	690,000	(2009)	
Kanowna Belle Gold Mine	Barrick Gold	Kalgoorlie	Goldfields-Esperance	284,000	(2009)	
Laverton Gold Mine	Crescent Gold Limited	Laverton	Goldfields-Esperance	73,474	(2009–10) ^{[11]}	
Lawlers Gold Mine	Gold Fields	Leinster	Goldfields-Esperance	352,000	(2009) ^{[7]}	
Marvel Loch Gold Mine	St Barbara Limited	Marvel Loch	Wheatbelt	156,105	(2008–09)	
Mount Morgans Gold Mine	Range River Gold	Laverton	Goldfields-Esperance	6,088	(2009–10) ^{[4]}	
Norseman Gold Mine	Norseman Gold Plc	Norseman	Goldfields-Esperance	80,753	(2008–09)	
Paddington Gold Mine	Norton Gold Fields Limited	Kalgoorlie	Goldfields-Esperance	140,436	(2009–10)	
Paulsens Gold Mine	Northern Star Resources	Pannawonica	Pilbara	75,089	(2009)	
Plutonic Gold Mine	Northern Star Resources Ltd.	Meekatharra	Mid West	144,000	(2009)	
Randalls Gold Mine	Integra Mining Limited	Kalgoorlie	Goldfields-Esperance	54,766	(2010–11) ^{[14]}	
Sandstone Gold Mine	Troy Resources NL	Sandstone	Mid West	29,885	(2009–10)	
South Kalgoorlie Gold Mine	Avoca Resources Limited	Kalgoorlie	Goldfields-Esperance	34,766	(2008–09) ^{[8]}	
St Ives Gold Mine	Gold Fields	Kambalda	Goldfields-Esperance	428,300	(2008–09)	
Sunrise Dam Gold Mine	AngloGold Ashanti	Laverton	Goldfields-Esperance	401,000	(2009)	
Telfer Mine	Newcrest Mining Limited	Telfer	Pilbara	688,909	(2009–10)	
Tropicana Gold Mine	AngloGold Ashanti (70%) Regis Resources (30%)	Woop Woop	Great Victoria Desert	310,000	(2023)	
Wattle Dam Gold Mine	Ramelius Resources	Kambalda	Goldfields-Esperance	16,283	(2008–09)	
White Foil Gold Mine	La Mancha Resources	Kalgoorlie	Goldfields-Esperance	none	(2008–09) ^{[12]}	
Wiluna Gold Mine	APEX Minerals NL	Wiluna	Mid West	68,049	(2010–11)	

== See also ==
- Mining in Australia
