= Higginsville =

Higginsville may refer to the following places:

- Higginsville, Missouri
- Higginsville, Nova Scotia
- Higginsville, West Virginia
- Higginsville, Western Australia
- Higginsville Gold Mine, a gold mine near Higginsville, Western Australia
