= Frog's leg =

Frog's leg may refer to:

- Frog legs, delicacies of French and Cantonese cuisine.
- Frog's Leg Gold Mine, a gold mine in Western Australia.
