= Daisy Milano Gold Mine =

Gold mine in Western Australia

Daisy Milano
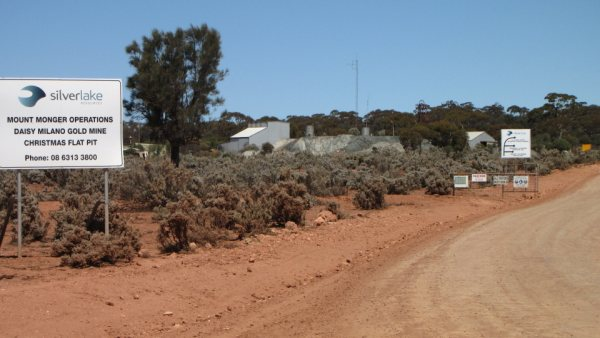
- Daisy Milano entrance

- Location in Western Australia
- Interactive map of Daisy Milano

Location
- Location: Kalgoorlie, Western Australia, Australia; 31°00′S 121°55′E

Production
- Products: Gold
- Production: 95,559 ounces^{[1]}
- Financial year: 2022–23

History
- Opened: 1990

Owner
- Company: Silver Lake Resources
- Website: www.silverlakeresources.com.au
- Acquired: November 2007

The Daisy Milano Gold Mine is a gold mine located 50 km south east of Kalgoorlie at Mount Monger Station, Western Australia.

It is currently owned by Silver Lake Resources, who reopened the mine in December 2007.

== History ==
Gold mines in the Kalgoorlie region

While in relatively close proximity to Kalgoorlie, the Mount Monger goldfield had seen no systematic exploration approach in the past. Mining had been carried out in the area from the early 1900s, mostly by small mining companies, gold having been found there in 1896. Approximately 400,000 ounces have been mined in the Mount Monger area, with old workings in the area reaching a depth of 80 metres.

The current Daisy Milano mine has been in operation since 1990. Originally it was an underground operation, with a shaft haulage system, but, under the ownership of Ridgeview Nominees, a decline was established in 2001. In May 2002, an underground miner was killed at the facility, having been found unconscious on an underground access road, next to an open electrical switch box.

The mine was placed in care and maintenance in March 2007 by owner Perilya, with the intention of selling it. Perilya itself had purchased the operations in January 2005 for $3.2 million, but suffered from a lack of own production facilities, having to cart its ore long distances to other company's plants, such as Harmony's Jubilee or Coolgardie, 100 km away from the mine.

Silver Lake, formed in 2004 and listed at the Australian Securities Exchange in 2007, acquired Daisy Milano in November 2007 for $14.5 million from Perilya.

Mining at Daisy Milano resumed in December 2007 and the first gold pour was carried out in April 2008. In the June quarter of 2009, Silver Lake also carried out open pit mining 1 km north of the underground operation, at Christmas Flat. Daisy Milano's ore was processed in the Silver Lake-owned Lakewood gold processing facility, which is located 5 km south east of Kalgoorlie and capable of processing 300,000 tonnes per annum. Silver Lake purchased the facility in November 2007 for $2.4 million.

On 10 June 2021, Paul Tamati Ereka Martin died after becoming unconscious at the Daisy Milano underground operation.

Daisy Milano is now the western-most of four operations which are part of Silver Lake's Mount Monger operation, with all ore being processed at the company's Randalls Gold Processing Facility, located at the Randalls Gold Mine. Apart from the Daisy Milano underground operation, ore is also sourced from Mount Belches underground and Aldiss open pit operations.

== Production ==
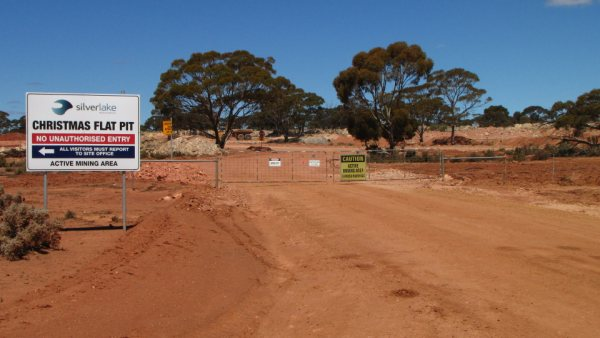
Christmas Flat pit gate

Annual production of the mine:

Year	Production	Grade	Cost per ounce
2000	5,551 ounces	7.1 g/t	US$201
2001	6,468 ounces	6.0 g/t	US$234
2004–05	4,827 ounces	7.96 g/t	
2005–06	25,573 ounces	7.5 g/t	A$596
2006–07	24,779 ounces	8.8 g/t	A$590
2007–08	5,808 ounces	10.2 g/t	A$
2008–09	49,272 ounces	9.4 g/t	A$780
2009–10	66,671 ounces	6.1 g/t	
2010–11			
2011–12			
2012–13			
2013–14			
2014–15			
2015–16			
2016–17			
2017–18			
2018–19			
2019–20			
2020–21	46,792 ounces	5.7 g/t	
2021–22	39,573 ounces	5.1 g/t	
2022–23	95,559 ounces^{[1]}	2.6 g/t	

== Notes ==
- ^[1]Production figure is for the combined Mount Monger Operations, which consist of the Daisy Milano and Mount Belches underground and Aldiss open pit operations.
