= Westgold =

Gold-mining company in Australia

- Company type: Public
- Traded as: ASX: WGX; TSX: WGX
- Industry: Gold mining
- Founded: 27 July 1987
- Headquarters: Perth, Western Australia, Australia
- Key people: Cheryl Edwardes (Chairman); Debbie Fullarton (CEO)
- Products: Gold
- Production output: 326,000 ounces (2024/25)
- Revenue: $1.3 billion (2024/25)
- Net income: $112 million (2024/25)
- Website: www.westgold.com.au

Westgold Resources, founded in 1987, is a gold producer and explorer based in Perth, Western Australia.

The company briefly lost its independence and was delisted from the ASX after it merged with Metals X in 2012, but the two companies de-merged in 2016 and Westgold was re-listed. It merged with Karora Resources in 2024.

== History ==
Gold mines in the Mid West region, with Westgold mines located at Fortnum, Meekatharra (Bluebird) and Cue (Big Bell)

Westgold was incorporated in Western Australia on 27 July 1987 and listed on the Australian Securities Exchange. The company underwent a number of name changes in its early years, originally being formed as Jenwood Resources NL, becoming Poverty Gold NL in April 1990, Gold and Resource Holdings NL in August 1993, Westgold Resources NL in January 1994 and Westgold Resources Limited in January 2008.

Metals X acquired a 27 per cent interest in Westgold in 2006. In May 2011, Westgold merged with Aragon Resources Limited, which owned a number of non-operational gold mining assets in the Murchison Goldfields, among them the historic Big Bell Gold Mine. Historically, the gold tenements Aragon brought to the merger had produced 5 million ounces of gold.

In 2012, Metals X took complete control of Westgold, at a reported cost of A$67 million, and de-listed the company from the ASX but maintained it as a subsidiary. In October 2013, Westgold purchased the Australian gold assets of Alacer Gold Corporation, thereby acquiring the operational South Kalgoorlie Gold Mine and the Higginsville Gold Mine, thereby becoming a gold producing company.

The South Kalgoorlie remained with Westgold after the de-merger, but the company sold the mine in March 2018 for A$80 million to Northern Star Resources, of which A$20 minion was paid in cash and the remainder in shares. The Higginsville mine was sold in June 2019 to Canadian company RNC Minerals for A$50 million, half of which was paid in cash and the remainder in shares. RNC Minerals, at the time, already owned the nearby Beta Hunt Mine.

In June 2014, Westgold acquired the Meekatharra Gold Operation, centered around the Bluebird Gold Mine, from the administrators of GMK Exploration, recommencing mining at Meekatharra in June 2015.

In October 2015, Westgold acquired the Fortnum Gold Mine.

Metals X and Westgold de-merged in December 2016 and the latter was subsequently re-listed on the ASX. While a number of Metals X board members initially remained on the board of both companies, Peter Cook became the managing director of Westgold, with the intention of resigning from the Metals X board in the following year.

On 1 August 2024, Westgold and Karora Resources merged. Westgold became a dual listed company with a listing on the Toronto Stock Exchange.

== Operations and production ==
As of 2022, Westgold operated three mining centres in Western Australia, the Fortnum Gold Mine, the Meekatharra Gold Operation centred around the Bluebird Gold Mine, and the Cue Gold Operation, which includes the historic Big Bell Gold Mine.

Annual production of the company since 2013:

Year	Gold production
2013–14	138,193 ounces ▲
2014–15	150,902 ounces ▲
2015–16	173,596 ounces ▲
2016–17	266,906 ounces ▲
2017–18	253,210 ounces ▼
2018–19	255,221 ounces ▲
2019–20	235,196 ounces ▼
2020–21	245,066 ounces ▲
2021–22	270,884 ounces ▲
2022–23	257,116 ounces ▼
