= Acacia fraternalis =

Maz's Myall

Scientific classification
- Kingdom: Plantae
- Clade: Tracheophytes
- Clade: Angiosperms
- Clade: Eudicots
- Clade: Rosids
- Order: Fabales
- Family: Fabaceae
- Subfamily: Caesalpinioideae
- Clade: Mimosoid clade
- Genus: Acacia
- Species: A. fraternalis

Binomial name
- Acacia fraternalis Maslin

Species of legume

Acacia fraternalis, also known as Maz's myall, is a species of flowering plant in the family Fabaceae and is endemic to the inland of Western Australia. It is a inverted cone-shape shrub with mostly glabrous branchlets, terete to flat phyllodes, spherical heads of light golden yellow flowers and narrowly oblong to broadly linear, firmly papery pods raised over the seeds.

== Description ==
Acacia fraternalis is an inverted cone-shaped shrub that typically grows to a height of mostly 1–3 m (3 ft 3 in – 9 ft 10 in) and has resinous new shoots and mostly glabrous branchlets, apart from minute hairs pressed against the surface at the ends. The phyllodes are terete to flat, mostly ascending to erect and not rigid, 60–100 mm (2.4–3.9 in) long, 0.5–1.5 mm (0.020–0.059 in) wide and glabrous. The flowers are borne in one or two spherical heads in racemes 1–20 mm (0.039–0.787 in) long on peduncles 4–9 mm (0.16–0.35 in) long. Each head is 3.5–5 mm (0.14–0.20 in) in diameter with 20 to 30 light golden yellow flowers. Flowering occurs from November to June and the pods are narrowly oblong to broadly linear, 30–60 mm (1.2–2.4 in) long and 7–10 mm (0.28–0.39 in) wide and firmly papery, raised over the seeds alternately on either side, and more or less glabrous. The seeds are oblong to elliptic or egg-shaped, 3.0–3.5 mm (0.12–0.14 in) long with a club-shaped to oblong aril.

== Taxonomy ==
Acacia fraternalis was first formally described in 2014 by Bruce Maslin in the journal Nuytsia from specimens he collected near Jimberlana Hill, about 7 km (4.3 mi) north-east of Norseman in 2013. The specific epithet (fraternalis) means 'brotherly', for the brother of the author John Allan Maslin, who "generously prepared distribution maps for many of the Western Australian Acacia taxa" that Bruce Maslin described.

== Distribution and habitat ==
Maz's myall occurs near Norseman and the now-abandoned township Higginsville with an outlier at Cundeelee in the Avon Wheatbelt and Coolgardie bioregions, where it grows in clay, sandy clay or sandy loam on the slopes of hills in very low open woodland, mallee heath, open woodland or tall shrubland.

== Conservation status ==
Acacia fraternalis is listed as "not threatened" by the Government of Western Australia Department of Biodiversity, Conservation and Attractions.

== See also ==
- List of Acacia species
