= Burnakura Gold Mine =

Gold mine in Western Australia

Burnakura
- Location in Western Australia
- Interactive map of Burnakura

Location
- Location: Reedy, Western Australia, Australia; 27°01′41″S 118°28′21″E

Production
- Products: Gold
- Production: 0
- Financial year: 2020–21
- Type: underground, open pit

History
- Opened: 1897
- Active: 1898–1916; 1989–1997 (Metana); 2000–2003 (St Barbara); 2005–2007 (Tectonic & Extract); 2009 (ATW Gold); 2012–2013 (Kentor Gold)
- Closed: 2013

Owner
- Company: Monument Mining Limited
- Website: monumentmining.com
- Acquired: 2014

The Burnakura Gold Mine is a gold mine located 45 kilometres (28 mi) northeast of Cue, Western Australia that operated for intermittent periods between 1898 and 2013. It is currently owned by the Canadian company Monument Mining Limited.

== History ==
Gold mines in the Mid West region

The mine consisted of both underground and open pit mining operations and a 160,000 tonne per annum plant.

First mined in modern times in the 1990s by Metana Minerals NL, Burnakura was later owned by Extract Resources Limited, which brought in Tectonic Resources NL as an operating partner. In 2005, underground production commenced by creating a portal and decline access to ore and milling began late 2005. In April 2007, milling ceased again and in October 2007, ATW purchased the mine for C$8.4 million.

Burnakura commenced production on 3 March 2009 and achieved commercial production in June that year, however due to a series of erratic vein sets with structural offsets, the mine is to be put back on care and maintenance.

Canadian mining company Monument Mining Limited acquired the mine in early 2014 but has not recommenced mining since.

== Production ==
Production of the mine:

Quarter	Production	Grade	Cost per ounce
2005–06	15,884 ounces	7.17 g/t	
2006–07	21,467 ounces	7.05 g/t	
2008	inactive		
2009			
2009–present	in care and maintenance		

== See also ==
- List of active gold mines in Western Australia
