= Randalls Gold Mine =

Gold mine in Western Australia

Randalls
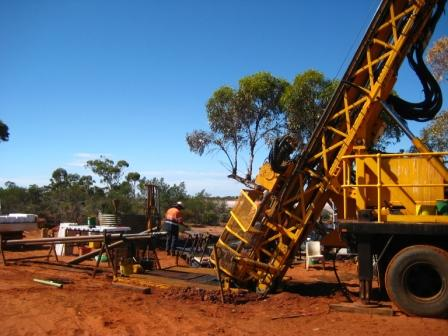
- A drill rig at the Salt Creek deposit

- Location in Western Australia
- Interactive map of Randalls
- Location: Kambalda, Western Australia, Australia; 31°06′24″S 122°01′54″E
- Products: Gold
- Production: 95,559 ounces^{[1]}
- Financial year: 2022–23
- Opened: 2010
- Company: Silver Lake Resources
- Website: www.silverlakeresources.com.au
- Acquired: 2013

The Randalls Gold Mine is a gold mine, recently developed, located 36 km east-north-east of Kambalda, Western Australia, near Mount Monger Station.

The mine, alongside the nearby Daisy Milano Gold Mine, is owned by Silver Lake Resources and both are part of their Mount Monger operations, being located in the area of the Mount Monger Station.

== History ==
Gold mines in the Kalgoorlie region

Integra began purchasing the area of their project in October 2003, when the Aldiss Gold Project was acquired. In March 2005, it expanded it through the purchase of the Randalls Project.

The company conducted an exploration program on its leases and purchased the processing facilities of the New Celebration Gold Mine in March 2006 for A$3.0 million. Integra removed the processing plant by May 2008 and placed it in storage.

The company completed a native title agreement with the Central Eastern Goldfields Aboriginal people in September 2009, securing a mining lease for the Salt Creek deposit.

Originally, the company planned to produce 75,000 ounces of gold per annum, but extended this target to 90,000 in June 2010 by sourcing ore from other open pit operations on its lease, mainly the Salt Creek deposit. An increase to 100,000 ounces is planned by 2012, with a possible upgrade of the processing plant to be able to produce 140,000 ounces per annum.

The company begun construction of its processing facility at Salt Creek in January 2010. It was speculated that Integra would become the target of a takeover when Swiss investment company Pala Investments increased its stake in the company. Pala already, at the time, owned 22.5% of Avoca Resources, a company engaged in a takeover war with Ramelius Resources for the ownership of the South Kalgoorlie Gold Mine and the Frog's Leg Gold Mine in the region.

The first gold pour at the mine took place on 24 September 2010 and the mine was officially opened on 8 October by the Minister for Mines & Petroleum, Norman Moore.

In August 2012, a A$426 million takeover of the mine's owner Integra by Silver Lake Resources, owner of the nearby Daisy Milano Gold Mine, was announced and completed by January 2013.

As of 2022, no mining is carried out at Randalls but the company's Randalls Gold Processing Facility serves as a centralised location for ore from the Daisy Milano Gold Mine, which is the western-most of four operations which are part of Silver Lake's Mount Monger operations. Apart from the Daisy Milano underground operation, ore is also sourced from Mount Belches underground and Aldiss open pit operations. Apart from the Mt Monger operations, Silver Lake also operates the Deflector Gold Mine, which it acquired through a merger with Doray Minerals in 2018.

== Production ==
Annual production of the mine:

Year	Production	Grade	Cost per ounce
2010–11	54,766 ounces	3.63 g/t	A$549
2011–12			
2012–13			
2013–14			
2014–15			
2015–16			
2016–17			
2017–18			
2018–19			
2019–20	197,150 ounces^{[1]}	3.5 g/t	
2020–21	194,954 ounces^{[1]}	2.6 g/t	
2021–22	131,328 ounces^{[1]}	2.4 g/t	
2022–23	95,559 ounces^{[1]}	2.6 g/t	

== Notes ==
- ^[1]Production figure is for the combined Mount Monger Operations, which consist of the Daisy Milano and Mount Belches underground and Aldiss open pit operations.
