= Indee Gold Mine =

Gold mine in Western Australia

Indee
- Location in Western Australia
- Interactive map of Indee
- Location: Whim Creek, Western Australia, Australia; 20°53′51″S 118°11′26″E
- Products: Gold
- Production: 0
- Financial year: 2020–21
- Opened: 2006
- Closed: 2008
- Company: De Grey Mining
- Website: degreymining.com.au
- Acquired: 2017

The Indee Gold Mine is a gold mine located 37 km east of Whim Creek, Western Australia. The mine was formerly owned by Range River Gold, The mine has been placed in care and maintenance since October 2008. but is now owned by De Grey Mining. At Indee, gold was extracted from the ore through heap leaching.

The mine is located in the Pilbara region of Western Australia, an area more commonly known for its large iron ore mines rather than gold mining.

== History ==
Range River Gold, listed on the Australian Securities Exchange, the ASX, in 2002, first acquired an interest in the Indee Gold Project through the purchase of Opus Exploration Pty Ltd in September 2003. It increased this interest to 70% in 2004.

The company commenced mining at Indee in April 2006 but announced in September 2007 that mining operations would wind down again. It ceased mining in December 2007 but continued processing operations until October 2008, when the mine was placed in care and maintenance, having produced 30,000 ounces of gold during its operational history.

After having received acceptance to buy the mine in 2017, De Grey Mining acquired the mine in July 2019 for A15 million.
