= Avoca Resources Limited =

Australian gold mining company

- Type: Public, ASX: AVO
- Industry: Resources
- Defunct: February 2011
- Fate: Merged with Anatolia Minerals Development Limited to form Alacer Gold Corp.
- Headquarters: Perth, Australia
- Key people: Robert Reynolds - Chairman; Rohan Williams - CEO
- Products: Gold
- Website: http://www.avocaresources.com.au/

Avoca Resources Limited (AVO) was an Australian gold mining company, based in Perth, Western Australia. It merged in with Anatolia Minerals Development Limited in 2011 to form Alacer Gold.

The company currently operates two gold mines, both in Western Australia, the Higginsville and the South Kalgoorlie Gold Mine. It is also part-owner of a third operation, the Frog's Leg Gold Mine, which it owns 49% of.

The latter two mines were acquired through the takeover of Dioro Exploration NL, which raised the company's annual production forecast to 270,000 ounces of gold. The takeover of Dioro was subject to a takeover war between Avoca and rival Ramelius Resources which lasted for almost one year. Avoca's successful bid made the company the largest gold tenement holder in the area spanning from Kalgoorlie to Kambalda.

== Company history ==
Gold mines in the Kalgoorlie region

Avoca was listed on the Australian Securities Exchange, the ASX, in April 2002.

Avoca paid A$6.25 million to Gold Fields for its Higginsville exploration project in June 2004. After discovering the Trident deposit in late 2004, Avoca raised $125 million in April 2007 to build a new mine at Higginsville. Also in 2007, Avoca purchased the neighbouring Chalice deposit from Chalice Gold Mines Limited. Gold production at the mine begun in 2008 from underground operations, with a first gold pour on 1 July 2008.

In its first year of production, the financial year 2008-09, Avoca produced 131,227 ounces of gold from its Higginsville operation.

=== Dioro takeover ===
On 14 April 2009, Avoca announced a takeover offer for Dioro Exploration NL, worth A$49 million. From mid-2009 onwards, Dioro became the subject of a takeover war between Avoca and Ramelius, with the later also making a bit for Dioro. Ramelius, owner of the Wattle Dam Gold Mine, was, like Avoca, interested in expanding its operations and targeted Dioro for its two operating gold mines, South Kal and Frog's Leg.

Avoca eventually had to drop its bid for Dioro, having reached a 44.85% interest in Dioro at the close of the offer on 20 August, short of the 50% needed. Ramelius's unsuccessful offer for the company closed on 8 February 2010, while Avoca made a renewed takeover offer for the company in late December 2009, despite having earlier declared that its August bid was final.

Avoca reached a relevant interest of 94.65% in Dioro on 3 March 2010 and commenced compulsory acquisition of the company. The company completed the compulsory acquisition by mid-April and Dioro was subsequently delisted from the Australian and the Toronto stock exchanges.

The final cost of the acquisition of Dioro for Avoca amounted to A$126 million. A subsequent attempt to purchase the remaining 51% of the Frog's Leg mine was however rejected by the owner, La Mancha Resources.

== Gold production ==
Gold production of the company:

Year	Production	Grade	Cost per ounce
2008-09 .	131,227 ounces	3.8 g/t	
2009-10			
