= Laverton Gold Mine =

Gold mine in Western Australia

- Location in Western Australia
- Interactive map of Laverton Gold Mine
- Location: Laverton, Western Australia, Australia; 28°37′16″S 122°29′23″E
- Products: Gold
- Production: 0
- Financial year: 2020–21
- Active: –1998 2007–2008 2009–2013
- Company: Focus Minerals
- Website: www.focusminerals.com.au
- Acquired: 2012

The Laverton Gold Mine is a gold mine 9 km east of Laverton, Western Australia. It was formerly owned by Crescent Gold Limited, under whom it recommenced mining in August 2009, after having been shut for just over one year, but has been owned by Focus Minerals since 2012. The mine is sometimes also referred to as the Barnicoat Gold Mine, named after its processing facility.

The mine is located on the native title of the Wongatha Aboriginal people, whom Crescent signed a Land Access Agreement with on 2 March 2005. In exchange for access, Crescent granted the representative of the Wongatha, the Wongatha Claim Group, up to 350,000 Crescent shares and between 0.2 and 0.4% in royalties of the future gold production. A similar agreement between the Wongatha and the owners of the BrightStar Gold Mine had taken place in 2004.

== History ==
The mine was owned by Sons of Gwalia, who closed it in 1998. Sons of Gwalia sold the mine in July 2002 to Focus Technologies Limited for A$2.68 million, who changed their name to Apollo Gold Mining in December 2002.

In June 2004, Apollo changed its name to Crescent Gold Limited.

The mine reopened after commissioning in March 2007, with the plant upgrade having finished in August 2007. Mining ceased once more on 7 July 2008, the official reason being that Crescent was to review the operation. Crescent incurred a loss of A$28.8 million for the 2007-08 financial year, leaving the company with A$50 million in cash in hand.

In February 2009, Crescent and Barrick Gold signed a memorandum of understanding in regards to ore from Laverton being processed at Barrick's Granny Smith Gold Mine rather than Crescent's Barnicoat processing facility, which would remain in care and maintenance.

Mining and haulage operations re-commenced in August 2009, with ore to be processed at the processing plant of Granny Smith, 20 km away.

A first gold pour at Granny Smith from Crescent's ore was announced on 21 October 2009.

Focus Minerals Limited, owner of the Coolgardie Gold Mine, placed a friendly takeover offer for Crescent Gold Limited in June 2011 which would place Focus in the top-five of the Australian gold producers with an annual production of 230,000 ounces. The bid values Crescent at A$66 million. Previous to the offer, Focus had already supplied the struggling Crescent with A$13 million in loans. After takeover of the mine by Focus Minerals, mining at Laverton continued, with ore continuing to be processed at Granny Smith, until operations were suspended in May 2013.

Focus Minerals carried out exploration at Laverton and its other operation, the Coolgardie Gold Mine, shut at the same time, following termination of mining. In the 2021 calendar year, it spent A$12.5 million on exploration at the two sites. In December 2021 the company approved a plan to resume mining at Coolgardie but no such plan had been made for the Laverton mine at this point.

== Production ==
Annual production figures of the mine:

Year	Production	Grade	Cost per ounce
1994–95	36,952 ounces	1.5 g/t	
1995–96	36,897 ounces	1.28 g/t	
1996–97	33,786 ounces	1.02 g/t	
1997–98	47,494 ounces	1.54 g/t	
1998–2006	inactive		
2006–07	7,400 ounces		
2007–08	56,195 ounces		
2008–09	inactive		
2009–10	73,474 ounces	1.43 g/t	
2010–11			
2011–12	86,673 ounces		
2012–13	81,191 ounces		
2013–present	inactive		
