= White Foil Gold Mine =

Gold mine in Western Australia

White Foil
- Location in Western Australia
- Interactive map of White Foil
- Location: Kalgoorlie, Western Australia, Australia; 30°46′25″S 121°15′02″E
- Products: Gold
- Production: 135,592 ounces^{[1]}
- Financial year: 2022–23
- Opened: 2004
- Website: evolutionmining.com.au/mungari/
- Acquired: 2015

The White Foil Gold Mine is a gold mine 23 km south-west of Kalgoorlie, Western Australia, owned and operated by Australian company Evolution Mining Limited, who purchased the mine in 2015.

== History ==
Gold mines in the Kalgoorlie region

The White Foil deposit was discovered in 1996.

The mine, then own jointly by Mines and Resources Australia (51%) and AurionGold Limited (49%), started operations in February 2002. Ore was treated at the Paddington Gold Mine, which, at the time, was owned by AurionGold, and the first gold pour took place in August 2002.

The mine was placed in care and maintenance in August 2003, after excessive flow of saline water into the open pit.

AurionGold was taken over by Placer Dome Limited in January 2003. Placer Dome in turn was taken over by Barrick Gold in March 2006.

In September 2006, La Mancha Resources announced the takeover of Mines and Resources Australia, a subsidiary of the French company Areva, and thereby the White Foil mine. The company dewatered the flooded pit in 2007 and 2008.

On 27 January 2010, La Mancha announced that ore from White Foil would be toll-treated at the new Three Mile Hill treatment plant at the Coolgardie Gold Mine, owned by Focus Minerals. Mining at White Foil was to resume in March 2010. Open pit operations at the mine restarted in 2014.

In April 2015, Evolution Mining completed the buy-out of La Mancha Resources Australian operations, valued at A$300 million, and thereby acquired the Frog's Leg and White Foil gold mines as well as the nearby processing plant at the Mungari. Ownership of the mines was eventually transferred on 24 August 2015.

Mining at Frog's Leg is carried out in an underground operation while White Foil is an open pit operation, with the ore processed at the Mungari plant, which was constructed in 2013–14.

== Production ==
Production figures of the mine:

Year	Gold production	Grade	Cost per ounce
2002–03	120,000 ounces		
2004–2007	inactive		
2008	1,910 ounces		
2009	inactive		

=== Evolution Mining ===
Production figures under Evolution Mining ownership:^{[1]}

Year	Production	Grade	Cost per ounce
2015–16	137,193 ounces^{[2]}		A$1,024
2016–17	143,820 ounces		A$1,143
2017–18	118,498 ounces		A$1,181
2018–19	120,535 ounces		A$1,320
2019–20	133,388 ounces		A$1,215
2020–21	115,829 ounces		A$1,453
2021–22	138,035 ounces		A$1,931
2022–23	135,592 ounces		A$2,083

== Notes ==
- ^[1]Combined production for the Mungari Operation, which consist of the Frog's Leg Gold Mine and the White Foil Gold Mine. Additionally to this, the Kundana and East Kundana underground operations were added to the Mungari Operation in 2021.
- ^[2]Figures from the date of ownership transfer, 24 August 2015, to 30 June 2016.
