= Bluebird Gold Mine =

Gold mine in Western Australia

Bluebird
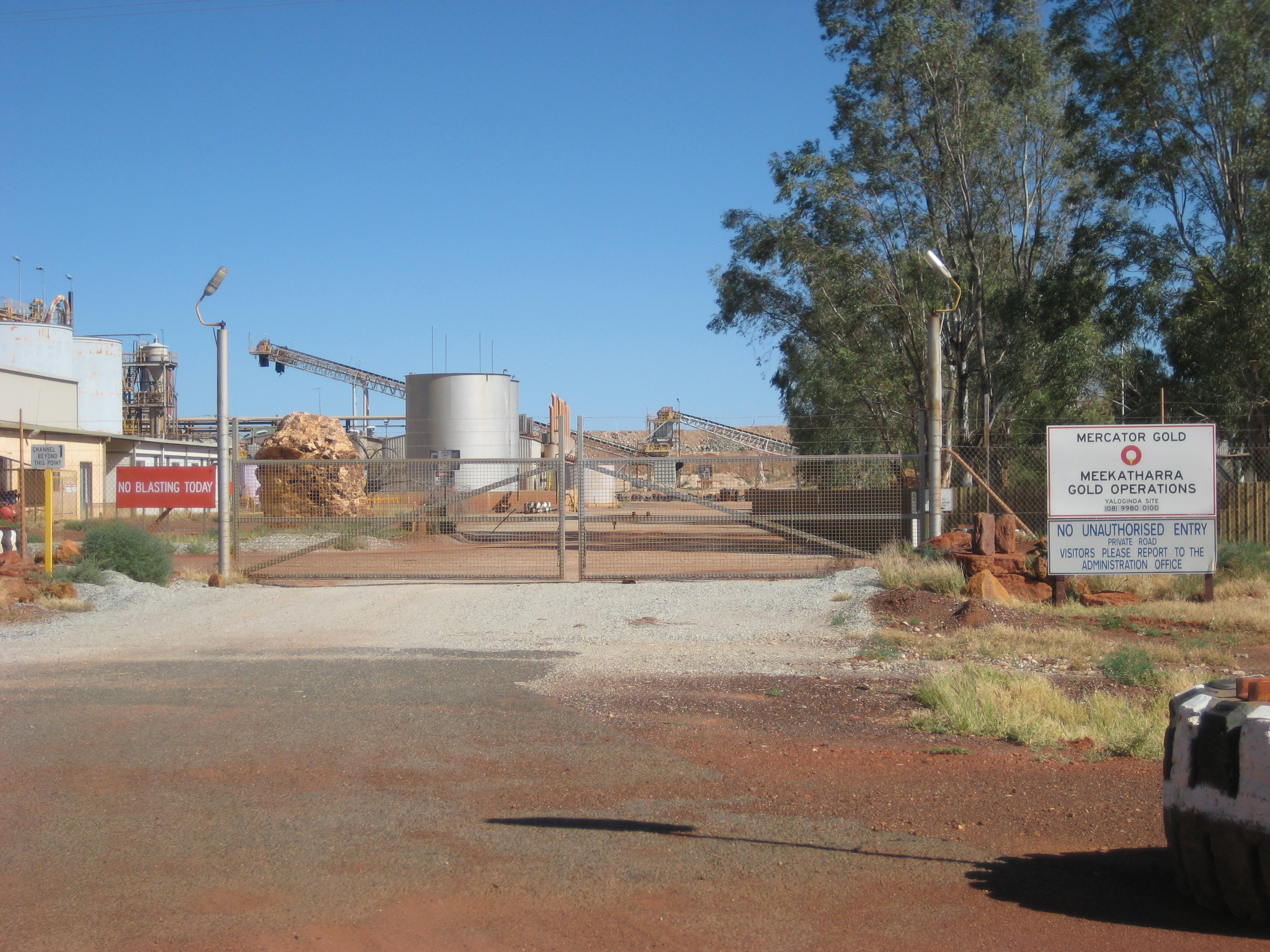
- The main gate of the Bluebird mine

- Location in Western Australia
- Interactive map of Bluebird
- Location: Meekatharra, Western Australia, Australia; 26°42′53″S 118°25′51″E
- Products: Gold
- Production: 203,000 troy ounces^{[2]}
- Financial year: 2022–23
- Opened: 1985
- Company: Westgold
- Website: www.westgold.com.au
- Acquired: 2014

The Bluebird Gold Mine is a gold mine located 15 km south-south-west of Meekatharra, Western Australia.

The mine is owned by Westgold, a company formed in November 2016 from the demerger of the gold assets of Metals X Limited, who acquired the project from Reed Resources in May 2014.

== History ==
Gold mines in the Mid West region

The mine was owned by St Barbara from 1991 to October 2005, when St Barbara sold it to Mercator, for $18 million in cash and shares and an $3 million environmental bond. At the time of the purchase, Mercator already owned a number of exploration leases in the area.

St Barbara spent $30 million on the mine in the early 2000s on upgrading plant and developing its surface and underground operations. Mining at Bluebird was suspended in May 2004. St Barbara subsequently sold the mine to Mercator Gold for $38 million.

Mining resumed under Mercator in the fourth quarter of 2007. The company planned to produce 90,000 ounces of gold in its first year, rising to 120,000 in 2008. Mining was carried out at the Surprise and the Bluebird open pit.

Mercator announced on 25 September 2008, that mining at its Surprise pit had been suspended because the proximity of the pit to the Great Northern Highway raised concerns. Milling was to continue until October that year and then resume in January 2009. Mercator also planned to raise $58 million to refinance its operations and pay off its debts.

On 9 October 2008, Mercator requested a suspension of trading following the appointment of Ferrier Hodgson as administrators to the company's operating subsidiary, Mercator Gold Australia Pty Ltd. All mining activities at Bluebird were suspended and the mine placed into care and maintenance. For the 2007-08 financial year, Mercator posted a loss of £31,883,479. Some of the reasons for the closure were a poor mine plan and the inability of the company to raise necessary capital during the 2008 financial crisis.

At the end of 2009, Mercator was hopeful, that the sale of the mine to Meekatharra Gold Corporation, a company to be listed on the Toronto Stock Exchange, should be finalised in 2010. After the Meekatharra Gold Corporation failed in its attempt to purchase the mine, it was sold to Reed Resources for $26.7 million in January 2011.

Reed hoped to reopen the mine by late 2012 and carry out mining in both an open pit and underground operation. Reed Resources refurbished the process plant and eventually commenced mining in January 2013. The operations suffered from high cost, low grades and performance issues, eventually forcing the company into administration. Forced to sell, Metals X initially offered A$7.7 million for the operations, increasing this to A$9.4 million in June 2014 to match rival bids. Metals X re-commenced mining at Bluebird in June 2015 and ore processing the following October.

In 2016, the mine came under Westgold Resources ownership when Metals X and Westgold de-merged, with the latter retaining ownership of company's the gold mining operations, including Higginsville.

As of 2022, the mine is part of Westgold's Murchison Operations, which consist of the Meekatharra and the Cue Gold Operation. The Meekatharra Gold Operation, with the Bluebird plant as its central processing location, consist of the Paddy’s Flat, South Emu-Triton and Bluebird underground mines and the surface operations at Five Mile Well, Maid Marion, Albury Heath and Aladdin open pits.

== Production ==
Annual production of the mine:

Year	Production	Grade	Cost per ounce
2000	86,798 ounces	0.93 g/t	A$321
2001	111,380 ounces	1.67 g/t	A$469
2002^{[1]}	97,254 ounces	2.29 g/t	A$459
2002–03	96,611 ounces	1,47 g/t	
2003–04	37,983 ounces	0.84 g/t	
2004–07	in care and maintenance		
2007–08	32,145 ounces		
2008–12	in care and maintenance		
2012–13			
2013–14			
2014–2015	in care and maintenance		
2015–16	37,182 ounces	2.25 g/t	A$1,436
2016–17	101,339 ounces	2.34 g/t	A$1,303
2017–18	112,430 ounces	2.56 g/t	A$1,492
2018–19	94,280 ounces	2.64 g/t	A$1,451
2019–20	104,088 ounces	2.62 g/t	A$1,496
2020–21	103,061 ounces	2.23 g/t	A$1,628
2021–22^{[2]}	204,937 ounces	2.5 g/t	A$1,748
2022–23^{[2]}	203,000 ounces		A$1,971

=== Notes ===
- ^[1]Figures for January to September 2002 only.
- ^[2]Combined result for the Murchison Operations consisted of the Meekatharra Gold Operation and the Cue Gold Operation. The Meekatharra Gold Operation consists of the Paddy’s Flat, South Emu-Triton and Bluebird underground mines and the surface operations at Five Mile Well, Maid Marion, Albury Heath and Aladdin open pits. The Cue Gold Operation consists of the Big Bell underground mine as its primary producer, supplemented by the Comet underground mine.
