= Paulsens Gold Mine =

Gold mine in Western Australia

Paulsens
- Location in Western Australia
- Interactive map of Paulsens
- Location: Pannawonica, Western Australia, Australia; 22°34′53″S 116°14′29″E
- Products: Gold
- Production: 0
- Financial year: 2020–21
- Opened: June 2005
- Closed: 2017
- Company: Black Cat Syndicate
- Website: www.blackcatsyndicate.com.au
- Acquired: 2022

The Paulsens Gold Mine is a gold mine located 105 km south of Pannawonica, Western Australia, within the pastoral lease of the Mount Stuart Station. It is fully owned by Black Cat Syndicate, having been purchased from Northern Star Resources in June 2022. Production at the mine was halted in December 2017 and it is currently in care and maintenance.

It is located within the Ashburton mineral field of Western Australia.

== History ==
The Paulsens Deposit was discovered and mined in the early 1930s and was then called the Melrose Mine.

A feasibility study was completed out by Taipan Resources NL in 1999, but a review continued until 2001, when St Barbara purchased 88% of Taipan.

The Paulsens mine was developed by the NuStar Mining Corporation, which was formed from a merger of Taipan Resources NL with St Barbara in 2004, but as a separate entity of the latter. In 1999, Taipan had completed a pre-feasibility study and, in 2001–02, a follow-up review was carried out. Shortly after the merger, in May 2004, development of the mine commenced. St Barbara sold their interest in the mine in 2005 to be able to finance its purchase of the gold division of insolvent mining company Sons of Gwalia.

A year later, on 25 May 2005, commissioning of the Paulsens process plant commenced and, in June 2005, the first gold ingot was poured.

In June 2006, NuStar Mining Corporation merged with Intrepid Minerals Corporation to form Intrepid Mines, a dual listed company listed both on the Australian and Toronto stock exchanges.

Intrepid Mines in turn merged with Emperor Mines in March 2008. The company's Australian headquarters are in Brisbane.

In July 2010, Northern Star Resources purchased the mine for A$40 million from Intrepid.

On 15 November 2015, Adam Perttula (28), a jumbo drilling offsider, collapsed underground in hot conditions at the mine, and died the next day. Northern Star was fined A$90,000 in 2017 for his death.

In December 2017, Northern Star halted production at the mine and relocated staff to other operations, placing the mine into care and maintenance.

== Mine ==
The Paulsens mine has 140 employees. Ore is mined in underground operations along two headings and treated on-site. The ore could also have been mined through open-cut mining but NuStar decided on an underground approach because of its lower establishment costs and an earlier positive cash flow. The mine has a production target of 70,000 to 80,000 ounces per annum with a throughput of approximately 320,000 tonnes of ore per annum.

A number of the components of the plant were second-hand, including a ball mill from the Higginsville Gold Mine.

In December 2008, the mine delivered the final ounces under existing hedge arrangements at A$627, now allowing the mine to enjoy full exposure to the spot gold price.

The mine was expected to cease production in early 2010, when its currently known resources were depleted. Intrepid was aiming to extend the mine life by further exploration drilling. In the first half of 2009, the mine has produced 44,656 ounces of gold. The plant was placed in care and maintenance in February 2010, but recommenced production in June.

Intrepid sold the mine to Northern Star Resources in July 2010 for A$40 million. In June 2022 the mine was sold to Black Cat Syndicate as part of a package of assets which also included the Coyote Gold Mine. Exploration for new resources is scheduled to commence in September 2022.

== Production ==
Annual production of the mine:

Year	Production	Grade	Cost per ounce
2004–05	7,358 ounces	10.1 g/t	
2005–06	78,848 ounces	8.6 g/t	
2006–07	64,408 ounces	6.6 g/t	
2007–08	81,172 ounces	8.3 g/t	
2008–09	75,368 ounces	6.8 g/t	
2009–10	48,587 ounces	6.8 g/t	
2010–11	86,522 ounces	10 g/t	
2011–12	67,206 ounces	6.6 g/t	
2012–13	88,603 ounces	7.2 g/t	
2013–14	100,041 ounces	7.4 g/t	
2014–15	74,999 ounces	5.4 g/t	
2015–16	80,742 ounces	7.2 g/t	A$1,099
2016–17	55,490 ounces	4.6 g/t	A$1,455
2017–18	22,436 ounces	4.6 g/t	A$1,450
2018–present	Inactive		
