= Frog's Leg Gold Mine =

Gold mine in Western Australia

Frog's Leg
- Location in Western Australia
- Interactive map of Frog's Leg
- Location: Kalgoorlie, Western Australia, Australia; 30°45′39″S 121°16′10″E
- Products: Gold
- Production: 135,592 ounces^{[1]}
- Financial year: 2022–23
- Opened: 2004
- Company: Evolution Mining
- Website: evolutionmining.com.au/mungari/
- Acquired: 2015

The Frog's Leg Gold Mine is a gold mine located 19 km west of Kalgoorlie, Western Australia, owned and operated by Australian company Evolution Mining Limited, who purchased the mine in 2015.

== History ==
Gold mines in the Kalgoorlie region

The gold deposit at Frog's Leg was discovered in 1999 and mining originally occurred in an open pit operation from April 2004 to October 2005, when operations ceased again. To the frustration of Dioro, Mines and Resources Australia Pty Ltd, a subsidiary of the French company Areva, delayed the development of an underground mine at the location, an impasse only solved by the sale of its 51% stake.

In September 2006, La Mancha Resources announced the takeover of Mines and Resources Australia's 51% share of the project and began a major drilling program to define potential resources. With this transaction, La Mancha also acquired the White Foil Gold Mine. In mid-2007, the company began to develop an underground operation. In May 2008, the first gold was poured at the mine and, on 1 January 2009, commercial production was achieved.

Dioro's ore from the Frog's Leg mine was processed at the Dioro-owned Jubilee Mill, located at the South Kalgoorlie Gold Mine, which was commissioned in 1987.

Dioro's 49% stake in the Frog's Leg mine, together with the South Kal operation were part of a takeover war between Avoca Resources and Ramelius Resources. Avoca, owner of the Higginsville Gold Mine and Ramelius, owner of the Wattle Dam Gold Mine, both in the area south of Kalgoorlie, were both interested in acquiring Dioro to combine their existing operations with Dioro's. After a failed bid by Avoca in August 2009 and a subsequent extension to the bid by Ramelius, Avoca made a new offer for Dioro on 29 December 2009, despite having earlier declared that its August bid was final. Avoca eventually succeeded in its bid for Dioro and, on 21 April 2010, Dioro was delisted from the ASX. Avoca, owner of the mine at the time, merged in with Anatolia Minerals Development Limited in 2011 to form Alacer Gold. Alacer sold its 49% stake in the mine to La Mancha in February 2013 for A$167 million.

In April 2015, Evolution Mining completed the buy-out of La Mancha Resources Australian operations, valued at A$300 million, and thereby acquired the Frog's Leg and White Foil gold mines as well as the nearby processing plant at the Mungari. Ownership of the mines was eventually transferred on 24 August 2015.

Mining at Frog's Leg is carried out in an underground operation while White Foil is an open pit operation, with the ore processed at the Mungari plant, which was constructed in 2013–14.

== Production ==
Production figures for the mine, split into individual owners.

=== La Mancha ===
La Mancha's financial year runs from 1 January to 31 December:

Year	Production	Grade	Cost per ounce
2008	15,375 ounces		
2009			

=== Dioro ===
Dioro's financial year runs from 1 September to 31 August:

Year	Production	Grade	Cost per ounce
2007–08	10,814 ounces	3.98 g/t	
2008–09	41,946 ounces	5.24 g/t	US$472

=== Evolution Mining ===
Production figures under Evolution Mining ownership:^{[1]}

Year	Production	Grade	Cost per ounce
2015–16	137,193 ounces^{[2]}		A$1,024
2016–17	143,820 ounces		A$1,143
2017–18	118,498 ounces		A$1,181
2018–19	120,535 ounces		A$1,320
2019–20	133,388 ounces		A$1,215
2020–21	115,829 ounces		A$1,453
2021–22	138,035 ounces		A$1,931
2022–23	135,592 ounces		A$2,083

== Notes ==
- ^[1]Combined production for the Mungari Operation, which consist of the Frog's Leg Gold Mine and the White Foil Gold Mine. Additionally to this, the Kundana and East Kundana underground operations were added to the Mungari Operation in 2021.
- ^[2]Figures from the date of ownership transfer, 24 August 2015, to 30 June 2016.
