= Coolgardie Gold Mine =

Gold mine in Western Australia

Coolgardie
- Location in Western Australia
- Interactive map of Coolgardie
- Location: Coolgardie, Western Australia, Australia; 30°56′03″S 121°11′49″E
- Products: Gold
- Production: 0
- Financial year: 2021
- Active: 1990–1999 2002–2005 2008–2013
- Company: Focus Minerals
- Website: www.focusminerals.com.au
- Acquired: 2005

The Coolgardie Gold Mine is a gold mine located at Coolgardie, Western Australia, currently owned by Focus Minerals Limited. The mine and its Three Mile Hill Processing Plant has been in care and maintenance since June 2013.

== History ==
Gold mines in the Kalgoorlie region

Historically, more than 2.6 million ounces of gold have been produced from the Coolgardie gold belt since mining commenced in 1892.

In the recent past, mining in Coolgardie was carried out by Goldfan, a wholly owned subsidiary of parent company Herald Resources Limited beginning in 1990 with the commissioning of the Three Mile Hill gold processing plant, which ceased production in 1999, but resumed mining in July 2002 after discovering high-grade ore at its Empress deposit. In 2003, Herald sold 50% of its interest at Coolgardie to MPI/Pittston for A$3.475 million.

In February 2005, Herald Resources sold their remaining mining leases to the Redemption Joint Venture, a partnership of Austminex and Matador. During 2005, Austminex changed its name to Focus Minerals while Matador merged with Committee Bay Resources. The sale was completed in August 2005, and the mine closed.

The mine became fully owned by Focus Minerals in May 2008, when the former bought Canadian partner Committee Bay Resources out of the Redemption Joint Venture for A$36.6 million.

In its current incarnation, under Focus Minerals, the mine once more resumed production in April 2008, now mining the high-grade Perseverance deposit, after achieving good drilling results. Focus had caused an uproar in Coolgardie in July 2007, when the local shire took objection to a prospecting application from the company because it believed it took in the town site.

After initially treating its ore at the Higginsville Mining-owned Greenfields plant, Focus is transitioning processing to its 100% owned Three Mile Hill facility located close by. In May 2009, Como Engineers began an extensive refurbishment program at Three Mile Hill, which was completed in December 2009. While the basic milling circuit remained the same, significant upgrades took place with the removal and replacement of the three crushers, the installation of a Gekko & Falcon gravity circuit and the installation of new elution, carbon regeneration and gold smelting areas.

Commissioning began in December 2009, with the first bar of gold poured on 13 January 2010. On 27 January Focus announced it would toll-treat ore from the White Foil Gold Mine, owned by La Mancha, in 2010.

Focus placed a friendly takeover offer for Crescent Gold Limited, owner of the Laverton Gold Mine, in June 2011, which would place the company in the top-five of the Australian gold producers with an annual production of 230,000 ounces. The bid values Crescent at A$66 million.

Focus Minerals suspended operations of the mine in June 2013 and placed it into care and maintenance.

Focus Minerals carried out exploration at Coolgardie and its other operation, the Laverton Gold Mine, shut at the same time, following termination of mining. In the 2021 calendar year, it spent A$12.5 million on exploration at the two sites. In December 2021 the company approved a plan to resume mining at Coolgardie but no such plan had been made for the Laverton mine at this point.

== Production ==
Annual production of the mine:

Year	Production	Grade	Cost per ounce
1997	97,910 ounces	2.36 g/t	A$440
1998	55,073 ounces	1.42 g/t	A$440
1999	8,213 ounces	0.9 g/t	A$498
1999–2002	inactive		
2002–03	23,030 ounces	1.97 g/t	A$
2003–04	66,852 ounces	2.51 g/t	A$500
2004–05	64,670 ounces	2.44 g/t	A$478
2005–2008	inactive		
2007–08	4,456 ounces	9 g/t	A$467
2008–09	41,401 ounces	5.43 g/t	A$603
2009–10	62,300 ounces	3.7 g/t	A$792
2010–11	72,832 ounces		
2011–12	89,959 ounces		
2012–13	58,629 ounces		
2013–present	inactive		
