= Burbanks Gold Mine =

Gold mine in Western Australia

Burbanks
- Location in Western Australia
- Interactive map of Burbanks
- Location: Coolgardie, Western Australia, Australia; 31°02′S 121°08′E
- Production: 2,078 troy ounces
- Financial year: 2020–21
- Opened: 1887
- Active: 1887–1914 1950s–1991 2006–2007 2009–2014 2015–2016 2021–2022
- Company: Process plant: Mineral Ventures Mine: Greenstone Resources
- Acquired: Process plant: 2019 Mine: 2017

The Burbanks Gold Mine is a gold mine located 9 km south east of Coolgardie, Western Australia.

The process plant of the mine is owned by Mineral Ventures while the mine is owned by Greenstone Resources.

== History ==
Gold mines in the Kalgoorlie region

The Burbanks deposit historically produced over 400,000 ounces of gold from both underground and open pit mining. Small scale mining still continued in the late 1990s. From 1887 to 1914, the mine was the highest grade gold mine in Western Australia with 22.7 grams of gold per tonne. It was mined by WMC Resources in the early 1950s but closed down in 1991. In this production period, the mine produced 324,479 ounces of gold at an average grade of 22.7 g/t.

=== Mine ===
Barra acquired the mine in September 2000 from WMC and mined the deposit in an underground operation, developing a decline from the already existing Lady Robinson pit from July 2006. After mining 24,900 ounces of gold, Barra stopped the operation in August 2007, allowing it to pursue an exploration campaign. In late 2007, Barra believed to have made one of the most spectacular gold discoveries in Australian resources history, hitting an intersection yielding a very high 10,300 grams of gold per tonne, at 350 metres below surface, in a vicinity where no drilling had been carried out before.

In June 2009, Burbanks recommenced gold production in a mining and profit-share arrangement between Barra and Mulgabbie Mining Pty Ltd. In this production period, the mine produced 420,000 ounces of gold.

Ownership of the mine changed hands numerous times in the following years, with Barra selling the mine to Kidman Resources in 2015 before buying it back again in 2017. At one point, in between, the mine was also owned by the Resources and Energy Group. Under Kidman's ownership the mine briefly reopened in 2015 but ceased production again the following year.

With the re-purchase of Burbanks, Barra also acquired the Birthday Gift underground mine at Burbanks, which Barra had sold in August 2013 to Blue Tiger Mines for A$2 million in cash and a A$25 royalty for every ounce of gold mined, while retaining the mining and exploration rights for the remainder of the lease.

Barra Resources changed its name to Greenstone Resources in November 2021 and mining at Burbanks resumed in December 2021, with ore processed at the Greenfields Mill, north-east of Coolgardie.

=== Process plant ===
The process plant was owned by Ramelius Resources from 2006, having purchased it from Coolgardie Custom Milling for A$2.8 million, for the purpose of utilising it to process ore from its Wattle Dam Gold Mine.

The plant was placed into care and maintenance once more in 2014 and, in August 2016, Maximus Resources purchased the plant from Ramelius Resources for A$2.5 million. Maximus planned to use it as a potential treatment plant for its Spargoville gold project, located 60km from Burbanks but was also open to treat ore from third-parties during this time.

Maximus Resources, in turn, sold the process plant for A$5.2 million to Mineral Ventures in September 2019, after an earlier attempt to sell it to SMS Innovation, a subsidiary of Adaman Resources, fell through. In the new agreement, Maximus retained the right to process 5,000 tonnes of ore per month for two years from January 2020.

A short period of trial mining took place at the mine in 2021–22, producing 2,078 ounces of gold.

== Production ==
Production of the mine:

Year	Production	Grade	Cost per ounce
1997	5,405 ounces	3.3 g/t	
1998	2,253 ounces	13.4 g/t	
1999	783 ounces ^{1}	19.2 g/t	
2006–07	17,840 ounces	3.64 g/t	
2007–15	inactive		
2015–16	5,743 ounces		
2016–21	inactive		
2021–22	2,078 ounces		

- ^{1} First quarter of 1999 only.
