= Wattle Dam Gold Mine =

Gold mine in Western Australia

Wattle Dam
- Location in Western Australia
- Interactive map of Wattle Dam
- Location: Kambalda, Western Australia, Australia; 31°22′27″S 121°29′18″E
- Products: Gold
- Production: 0
- Financial year: 2020–21
- Opened: 2006
- Closed: 2012
- Company: Maximus Resources
- Website: maximusresources.com/wattle-dam/
- Acquired: 2016

The Wattle Dam Gold Mine is a gold mine located 25 kilometres south west of Kambalda, Western Australia and is owned by Maximus Resources.

It is formerly owned by Ramelius Resources. Ramelius, listed at the Australian Securities Exchange since 2003, discovered Wattle Dam in 2005 and began mining the deposit in 2006.

Ore from Wattle Dam was not treated on site but rather taken to the company's Burbanks Treatment Plant, eight kilometres south of Coolgardie, near the Burbanks Gold Mine which was owned by Barra Resources. Mining at Wattle Dam ceased in 2012, with the mine in care and maintenance since.

== History ==
Gold mines in the Kalgoorlie region

Ramelius discovered the deposit in 2005 and began mining in March 2006. After two periods of open-pit mining in 2006 and 2008–09, underground development by HWE Mining commenced in May 2009. The company expects high grade underground ore to be available for milling in December 2009.

The ore was treated at the Burbanks Treatment Plant, 65 km from Wattle Dam. Ramelius purchased the plant in November 2006 for $2.8 million. Ramelius spent a further $1.3 million on refurbishing the facility, which has a capacity to treat up to 180,000 tonnes of ore per annum. When not used for Wattle Dam ore, the facility toll treats third party ore, for example from July to September 2009. Before the purchase of Burbanks, Ramelius had its ore treated at the plant of the Higginsville Gold Mine, owned by Avoca Resources.

Ramelius made headlines in 2009 when it became engaged in a bitter dispute with Avoca Resources over conflicting takeover bids for Dioro Exploration NL. Avoca eventually had to drop its bid for Dioro, having reached a 44.85% interest in Dioro at the close of the offer on 20 August, short of the 50% needed. Ramelius's offer for the company closes on 8 February 2010. Avoca made a renewed takeover offer for the company in late December 2009. Avoca eventually succeeded in its bid for Dioro and, on 21 April 2010, Dioro was delisted from the ASX.

The mine ceased production in 2012, having produced 213,650 ounces of gold from its underground operations between 2006 and 2012, reaching a depth of 365 metres, and at a grade of 14.9 grams per tonne. Open pit mining at Wattle Dam, which finished in 2008, produced a further 52,700 ounces, at a grade of 5.3 grams per tonne. Both the underground and surface mining grade is considered high by industry standards.

Ramelius purchased the Hill 50 Gold Mine from Harmony Gold for $40 million in July 2010, and eventually opted to focus on this operation instead.

Ramelius sold the mine to Tychean Resources in 2013 who, in turn, sold the mine on to Maximus Resources two years later.

== Production ==
Annual production of the mine:

Year	Production	Grade	Cost per ounce
2005–06	4,190 ounces		
2006–07	16,963 ounces	8.36 g/t	
2007–08	16,154 ounces	5.25 g/t	
2008–09	16,283 ounces	3.74 g/t	
2009–10			
2010–11			
2011–12			
2012–present	In care and maintenance		
