= Central Norseman gold mine =

Gold mine in Norseman, Western Australia

- Location in Western Australia
- Interactive map of Central Norseman gold mine
- Location: Norseman, Western Australia, Australia; 32°11′44″S 121°47′41″E
- Products: Gold
- Production: 24,520
- Financial year: 2022–23 ounces
- Discovered: 1894
- Opened: 1936–2014 2022–present
- Company: Pantoro Limited
- Website: www.pantoro.com.au
- Acquired: 2019

The Central Norseman gold mine is located at Norseman, Western Australia. Norseman lies at the southern end of the Norseman-Wiluna Greenstone Belt, in the Eastern Goldfields Province of the Yilgarn Block, Western Australia.

The mine was owned by an unincorporated 50/50 joint venture between Tulla Resources, formerly Norseman Gold, and Pantoro Limited until a merger of the two in June 2023. Until its closure in 2014 it was Australia's longest continuously running gold mining operation, producing approximately six million ounces from its opening in 1935. The mine recommenced production in 2022.

== History ==
Gold was first discovered in the district in 1892 at Dundas, 22 km south of present-day Norseman. This was followed on 11 August 1894 by a gold discovery at Dundas Hills at the site of the future town of Norseman by Lawrence Sinclair, his brother George Sinclair and Jack Alsopp who were following up specks of alluvial gold found in a small gully. The discovery claim was initially named the Dundas Reward, and renamed The Norseman, after Sinclair's horse Hardy Norseman. The Sinclair family came to Western Australia in December 1863 from the Shetland Isles.

In 1935, a new era of mining began for the town, when Western Mining Corporation arrived in the region and invested in its infrastructure.

Operated by Central Norseman Gold Corporation Ltd, a subsidiary of Western Mining, the mine became effectively owned by Croesus Mining NL in February 2002, when Croesus purchased WMC's 50.5% share of the company for A$75 million. Croesus Mining went into administration in June 2006, after gold production levels at Norseman fell short of hedging commitments.

The mine was operated by Central Norseman Gold until April 2007, when it passed into the ownership of Davos Gold Pty Ltd, now Norseman Gold, who purchased it for a sum in excess of A$60 million. Central Norseman gold mine had been in administration for eleven months at the time of the sale.

The mine was an underground mining operation, first from the Phoenix Shaft on the Mararoa Reef, then on the Crown Reef from the Regent Shaft on the north end of the Mararoa and further north at the North Royal Mine and finally with two declines being mined, Bullen and Harlequin. A third decline, the OK, commenced production in 2010.

Gold mining operations at closure in 2014 included the Bullen and Harlequin mines and the Phoenix Mill.

In July 2019, Pantoro Limited acquired 50 percent of the mine from Norseman Gold for A$50 million in cash and considerations. Additionally, Pantoro would also solely fund the project for four years after the transaction with up to A$50 million in expenses.

In February 2021 it was announced that Pantoro Limited to invest A$57 million into refurbishing the mine with the intention of eventually reopening it. in February 2023, it was announced Pantoro was seeking to acquire full ownership of Tulla Resources and the Norseman gold project.

== Production and resources ==
In 2014 the Norseman Gold plc reported a measured and indicated resource of 11.4 million tonnes grading 3.1 g/t gold, totalling 1.13 million ounces. No reserves were reported.

=== Production ===
Production of the mine:

Year	Production	Grade	Cost per ounce
2022–23	24,520 ounces		

== Treatment ==
The gold processing plant at Phoenix, a mine abandoned in 1953, 20 kilometres (12 mi) south the North Royal Open Pit and 2 kilometres (1.2 mi) from the closed down Regent Shaft, uses conventional milling and carbon-in-leach technology to recover gold. Process water is obtained from a bore-field for the mining operations. Power is supplied by a third party on-site 10 MW power station that also supplies power to the Norseman township. The capacity of the processing facility is approximately 720,000 tonnes per annum.

== Mine safety ==
Recently, three workers were killed in a six-year span at Central Norseman. On 5 August 2010, an underground miner at the mine was found dead at a new escape rise. There was a further fatality at the Harlequin underground mine after a rockfall on 15 February 2014, and another on 26 July 2016 when a boilermaker was crushed while working at the mine plant.
