= Kanowna Belle Gold Mine =

Gold mine in Western Australia

Kanowna Belle
- Location in Western Australia
- Interactive map of Kanowna Belle
- Location: Kalgoorlie, Western Australia, Australia; 30°36′39″S 121°34′36″E
- Products: Gold
- Production: 163,679 ounces^{[1]}
- Financial year: 2022–23
- Opened: 1993
- Company: Northern Star Resources
- Website: www.nsrltd.com
- Acquired: 2014

The Kanowna Belle Gold Mine is a gold mine 19 kilometres (12 mi) north-east of Kalgoorlie, Western Australia, near the ghost town of Kanowna.

Kanowna Belle is operated by Northern Star Resources. It has one viewing platform and an interpretive centre.

== History ==
Gold mines in the Kalgoorlie region

The gold deposit was discovered in 1989 by Delta Gold NL and Geopeko Gold and construction begun in 1992, with mining in open pit operation starting in 1993. The mine was officially opened by Western Australian Premier Richard Court on 19 November 1993.

The project was solely owned by Delta Gold from 1999, when it purchased the remaining 50% for A$90 million. Delta later merged with fellow Australian company Goldfields to form Auriongold in February 2002. Aurion was taken over by Placer Dome in 2003, who already, at this stage, held a 60% interest in the mine, and Placer Dome in turn by Barrick Gold in March 2006 for US$10.4 billion.

The Kanowna Belle processing plant, as of 2008, treated ore from three underground operations, Kanowna Belle, Raleigh and Bullant. In 2016 ore was sourced from Raleigh-Rubicon at Kundana, and from Kanowna Belle.

In August 2009, Daniel Williams, a truck driver working 900 metres underground, fell to death at the mine. It was the fourth fatal accident in Australian mining in 2009 and the eighth in 14 months.

In early 2014, Northern Star Resources purchased the Kanowna Belle Gold Mine, Plutonic and Kundana Gold Mines from Barrick Gold for US$100 million. Following this, in June 2014, Northern Star Resources completed the purchase of the Jundee Gold Mine from Newmont at a cost of $US82.5 million, thereby making the company Australia's second-largest gold producer, behind Newmont, at the time.

The mine subsequently became part of the company's Kalgoorlie Operations, which consist of the South Kalgoorlie Gold Mine, purchased in 2018, the Kanowna Belle Gold Mine, the Kundana Gold Mine and the East Kundana Joint Venture (51 percent Northern Star Resources owned), with ore from the later two processed at the Kanowna Belle plant.

== Technology ==
The Kanowna site is underground a trial of Caterpillar's Minegem autonomous loader technology.

== Production ==
=== Kanowna Belle Gold Mine ===
Annual production of the mine:

Year	Production	Grade	Cost per ounce
2000	314,363 ounces	5.68 g/t	A$245
2001	270,552 ounces	4.87 g/t	A$306
2002 ^{[2]}	178,582 ounces	4.63 g/t	A$320
2003			
2004	237,291 ounces		US$ 316
2005	490,000 ounces		
2006	506,000 ounces	0.102 oz/t	US$477
2007	362,000 ounces	0.102 oz/t	US$659
2008	267,000 ounces	0.160 oz/t	US$734
2009	284,000 ounces		US$532
2010			
2011			
2012			
2013	134,000 ounces		
2014	111,758 ounces	5 g/t	

=== Kalgoorlie Operations ===
Production figures for the combined Kalgoorlie Operations, which consist of the South Kalgoorlie Gold Mine and the Kanowna Belle mine. The Kundana Gold Mine and the East Kundana Joint Venture (51 percent Northern Star Resources ownership) were part of the Kalgoorlie Operations until sold in July 2021:

Year	Production	Grade	Cost per ounce
2014–15			
2015–16			
2016–17			
2017–18			
2018–19	334,527 ounces	3.8 g/t	A$1,330
2019–20	317,248 ounces	3.2 g/t	A$1,564
2020–21	256,657 ounces	3.1 g/t	A$1,942
2021–22	171,027 ounces	2.6 g/t	A$1,949
2022–23	163,679 ounces	2.8 g/t	A$1,876

== Notes ==
- ^[1]Production figure is for the combined Kalgoorlie Operations, which consist of the Kanowna Belle mine and South Kalgoorlie Gold Mine. The Kundana Gold Mine and the East Kundana Joint Venture (51 percent Northern Star Resources ownership) were part of the Kalgoorlie Operations until sold in July 2021.
- ^[2]Figures for January to September 2002 only.
