= Northern Star Resources =

Gold mining company

- Traded as: ASX: NST
- Industry: Mining
- Founded: 2003
- Headquarters: Perth, Western Australia
- Products: Gold
- Production output: 1,633,615 ounces (2024–25)
- Revenue: $6.4 billion (2025)
- Net income: $3.5 billion (2025)
- Website: www.nsrltd.com

Northern Star Resources is an Australian gold mining company listed on the Australian Securities Exchange (ASX:NST) with operations in Western Australia and Alaska.

== History ==
Northern Star Resources Ltd (NSR) was founded in December 2003 to search for and develop ore deposits in the East Kimberley region of Western Australia. It was listed on the Australian Securities Exchange in December 2003. With Jubilee Mines NL as the cornerstone investor, it initially focused on greenfields exploration near Halls Creek but was unsuccessful and by the Global Financial Crisis was "teetering on bankruptcy".

In 2007, Bill Beament was appointed CEO. He subsequently led a recapitalisation of the company with Michael Fotios, raising funds at 1.25 cents per share and with a market capitalisation of just $1 million. Beament sought to refocus on undervalued mining assets using his background as an underground geologist. In 2010, Northern Star made its first major acquisition by buying the Paulsens Gold Mine from Intrepid Mines Limited for $40 million.

The Paulsens acquisition launched Northern Star as a gold producer and during the 2014 financial year the company rapidly expanded by buying four additional mines, including Jundee Gold Mine. This made it "the nation's second-biggest goldminer, behind Newcrest Mining". Beament was appointed executive chairman in 2016.

In 2019, Northern Star announced the acquisition of a 50 percent stake in the Super Pit gold mine from Newmont Goldcorp for $US800 million. In October 2020, a merger between NSR and Saracen Mineral Holdings, its joint venture partner in the Super Pit, was proposed. The merger was completed in February 2021 when Saracen was de-listed from the Australian Securities Exchange.

By 2026, following a surge in gold prices, Northern Star had reached a market capitalisation of $44 billion and was "the country's largest listed gold producer".

== Operations ==
=== Current ===
- Carosue Dam Gold Mine (4 underground mines: Karari, Whirling Dervish, Porphyry 45 km north and Deep South mine 70 km to the North)
- Jundee Gold Mine
- Kanowna Belle Gold Mine
- KCGM Operations (Kalgoorlie Super Pit and Mt Charlotte underground)
- Pogo Gold Mine
- South Kalgoorlie Gold Mine or Jubilee Gold Mine
- Thunderbox Gold Mine (1 underground mine: Thunderground & 2 Open Pit Mines)

=== Former ===
- Plutonic Gold Mine
- Kundana Gold Mine and East Kundana Joint Venture (51 percent Northern Star Resources), sold to Evolution Mining in July 2021
- Paulsens Gold Mine sold to Black Cat Syndicate in June 2022
