= BrightStar Gold Mine =

Gold mine in Western Australia

BrightStar Gold Project
- Location in Western Australia
- Interactive map of BrightStar Gold Project

Location
- Location: Laverton, Western Australia, Australia; 28°50′28″S 122°38′49″E

Production
- Products: Gold
- Production: 0
- Financial year: 2021

History
- Opened: 2009
- Active: 2009–2011
- Closed: 2011

Owner
- Company: Brightstar Resources Limited
- Website: www.brightstarresources.com.au
- Acquired: 2002

The BrightStar Gold Mine is a gold project located 35 km south-east of Laverton, Western Australia. Operations at Brightstar are suspended with the processing plant under care and maintenance.

Owned by Stone Resources Australia Limited, it was in production from December 2009 to 2011. Stone Resources Australia Limited is owned and controlled to 55.61% by Chinese company Stone Resources Limited, which currently funds the company's activities.

== History ==
Gold mines in the Kalgoorlie - Leonora region

Stone Resources Australia, as A1 Minerals, was formed in May 2002 and listed on the Australian Securities Exchange in December 2003. A1 Minerals Limited changed its name to Stone Resources Australia Limited on 30 November 2011. The BrightStar gold project was an asset of the company at the time of listing on the ASX.

The mine is located within an area subject to the Wongatha native title claim. The Wongatha group is a shareholder of Stone Resources. In exchange for the consent of the Wongatha people to any current or future mining tenements, Stone agreed to protect all aboriginal sites, offer training and employment and issue shares in the value of $220,000 to the Wongatha.

Stone expanded BrightStar by acquiring the historical Mikado Gold Mine (28°50'25.71"S 122°38'38.45"E) in July 2005 from Deep Yellow Limited, which had previously mined the deposit in 2004. The deposit had also been mined from 1900 to 1911, when 9,916 ounces of gold had been recovered.

In July 2008, Stone purchased a second-hand gold processing plant, which it relocated from Kalgoorlie to the Mikado mine site. In May 2009, Stone signed a $1.7 million contract for the refurbishment of the plant. In July 2009, the company received the necessary approvals from the state mining regulator for the mine project.

The expanded BrightStar project included a number of proposed and existing open pits. Stone planned to recommence mining the existing Alpha (Brightstar) and Beta (Mikado) pits, producing 30,000 ounces of gold per annum. New pits were proposed for Gamma, Delta, Epsilon, Zeta, Eta and Theta (in the Corktree Well and King of Creation areas, 30 to 50 km north of Laverton).

Mining commenced in May 2010 with 2,700 ounces of gold produced for the second quarter of 2010.

The mine continuously underperformed after start up, staying below the targeted production of 2,500 ounces of gold per month, with a low point of just 702 ounces produced in April 2011. Stone went into a lengthy ASX trading halt in July 2011 during an attempt to secure more funding.

In 2014 additional plant modifications were proposed to improve gold recovery. Mining at BrightStar ceased in September 2011, with remaining ore processed in the following month. By the companies own admission, the 21,726 ounces of gold and 14,586 ounces of silver produced during the mine's operation were a disappointing result in comparison to the expectations for the project. The company's stated reasons for the underperformance of the operation were inaccurate geological data, poor open pit design and poor mill maintenance. The process plant continued to operate until September 2012, treating ore from third parties.

In December 2020, Stone Resources became Brightstar Resources, having previously been A1 Minerals until November 2011.

In May 2021 it was announced that Brightstar Resources planned to spend A$5.5 million on upgrading the Brightstar process plant. The upgrade is part of a plan to recommence mining from three different locations within a 65km radius of the plant.

== Production ==
Production figures for the mine:

Year	Production	Grade	Cost per ounce
2008–09	inactive		
2009–10	2,700 ounces		
2010–11	14,287 ounces		
2011–12	4,972 ounces		
2011–present	inactive		
