= South Kalgoorlie Gold Mine =

Gold mine in Western Australia

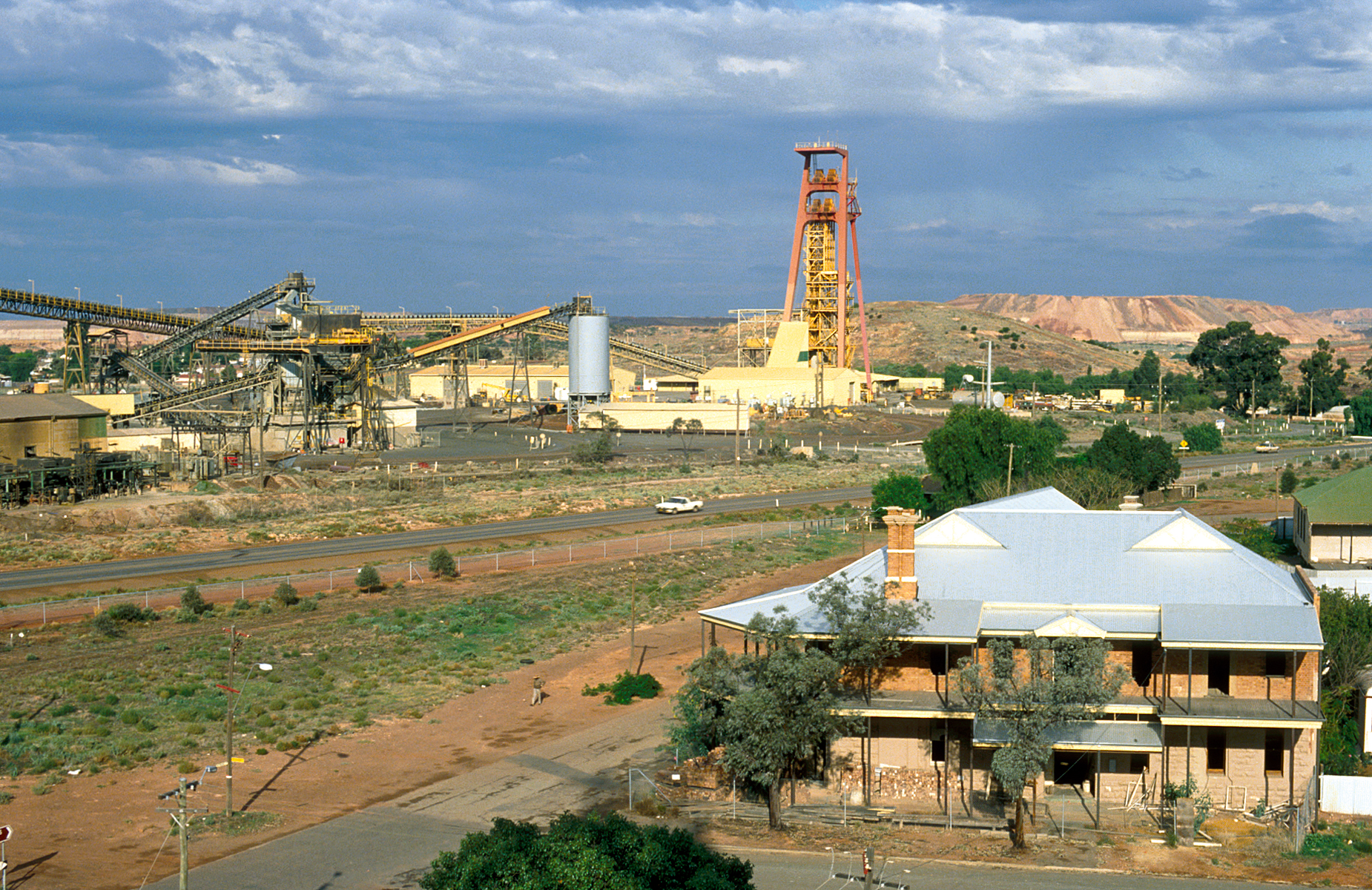

- Location in Western Australia
- Interactive map of South Kalgoorlie Gold Mine
- Location: Feysville, Kalgoorlie, Western Australia, Australia; 31°02′20″S 121°36′53″E
- Products: Gold
- Production: 163,679 ounces^{[1]}
- Financial year: 2022–23
- Discovered: 1982
- Opened: 1986
- Company: Harmony Gold (2001–2007); Dioro Expl. (2007–2010); Avoca Gold (2010–2011); Alacer Gold (2011–2013); Metals X (2013–2016); Westgold (2016–2018); Northern Star Resources (2018–
- Website: www.nsrltd.com
- Acquired: 2018

The South Kalgoorlie Gold Mine is a gold mine located south-west of Kalgoorlie, Western Australia. The mine is sometimes also referred to as "South Kal Mines - New Celebration", being a merger of the former New Celebration Gold Mine and the Jubilee Gold Mine, which were combined in 2002.

The mine is operated by Northern Star Resources, who purchased it from Westgold in 2018 for A$80 million.

The mine is located on freehold land allocated for pastoral use by the Government of Western Australia in the late 1800s and is therefore not subject to state royalties, and exempt from certain planning and mining requirements.

== History ==
=== Jubilee ===
Originally owned by Hampton Australia, the mine was taken over by Normandy Mining in January 1994. It was then owned by Normandy until April 1996, when it was acquired by New Hampton Goldfields, which, in turn, was taken over by Harmony Gold in April 2001 for $54 million.

=== New Celebration ===
Discovered in 1982 by Newmont as part of the Location 50 Joint Venture (with Hampton Assets and Hampton Trust), the mine opened in late 1986. It was divested by Newmont into Newcrest in 1991. New Celebration became a subsidiary of Hill 50 Gold in August 2001, when Newcrest sold the mine for A$10 million.

Harmony announced a take over bid for Hill 50 Gold Limited in December 2001 and compulsory acquired outstanding Hill 50 shares and listed options in April 2002, after achieving a 99% interest in the company. Harmony paid A$233 million for this acquisition.

=== South Kalgoorlie ===
Gold mines in the Kalgoorlie region

Harmony merged the New Celebration and the Jubilee operations to form South Kal in 2002.

South Kal became part of Harmony's Australian operations, consisting of Hill 50, the Hill 50 Gold Mine, the Big Bell Gold Mine (closed June 2003) and the Gidgee Gold Mine (sold in December 2003).

In December 2007, Harmony in turn sold the operation to Dioro Exploration NL.

Dioro settled the purchase of the mine on 30 November 2007. Harmony Gold received A$45 million for the operations, of which $25 million were in cash while the remainder was paid in Dioro shares.

Dioro suffered a number of set-backs at its South Kal mine, when, on two occasions, major pit wall collapses interrupted mining. These events, in October 2008 at the Mt Marion pit and in January 2009 at the HBJ pit, made access to high-grade ore temporarily impossible and affected operational cash flow for more than six months.

Ore from the South Kalgoorlie mine is processed at the nearby Jubilee Mill, commissioned in 1987, which, at one point during Dioro's ownership, also processed ore from the Frog's Leg Gold Mine, which Dioro owned 49% of. The former New Celebration plant, which functioned as the processing facility for the mine, was sold to Integra Mining in May 2006 for A$3 million. Integra removed the processing plant by May 2008, to use it at its new Randalls Gold Mine.

The South Kal operation, together with Dioro's 49% stake in the Frog's Leg mine were part of a takeover war between Avoca Resources and Ramelius Resources. Avoca, owner of the Higginsville Gold Mine and Ramelius, owner of the Wattle Dam Gold Mine, both in the area south of Kalgoorlie, were both interested in acquiring Dioro to combine their existing operations with Dioro's. After a failed bid by Avoca in August 2009 and a subsequent extension to the bid by Ramelius, Avoca made a new offer for Dioro on 29 December 2009, despite having earlier declared that its August bid was final.

Avoca, owner of the mine at the time, merged in with Anatolia Minerals Development Limited in 2011 to form Alacer Gold. Alacer Gold, in turn, sold its Australian operations, consisting of South Kalgoorlie and the Higginsville Gold Mine, to Metals X in September 2013 for A$40 million. Metals X took ownership of the mine on 1 October 2013 and operated it through its subsidiary Westgold. In 2016, Metals X and Westgold de-merged, with the latter retaining ownership of the gold mining operations, including South Kalgoorlie.

Westgold Resources, in turn, sold the mine in March 2018 for A$80 million to Northern Star Resources, of which A$20 minion was paid in cash and the remainder in shares. The mine subsequently became part of the company's Kalgoorlie Operations, which consist of the South Kalgoorlie mine, the Kanowna Belle Gold Mine, the Kundana Gold Mine and the East Kundana Joint Venture (51 percent Northern Star Resources owned). At this point, mining at the South Kalgoorlie mine was carried out exclusively underground.

In July 2022, Northern Star announced that it would idle the Jubilee mill in an effort to cut cost.

== Production ==
Production figures for the mine:

=== New Celebration ===
Year	Production	Grade	Cost per ounce
2000	74,311 ounces	4.0 g/t	A$370
2001	80,556 ounces	4.25 g/t	
2002 ^{[4]}	74,883 ounces	3.68 g/t	A$365

=== Jubilee ===
Year	Production	Grade	Cost per ounce
2000	90,362 ounces	2.8 g/t	A$413
2001			
2002			

=== South Kal ===
Year ^{[2]}^{[3]}	Production	Grade	Cost per ounce
2003	509,654 ounces	2.22 g/t	
2004	338,272 ounces	2.2 g/t	US$326
2005	296,848 ounces	2.5 g/t	US$338
2006	231,517 ounces	2.33 g/t	US$419
2007	224,797 ounces	2.36 g/t	US$513
2007–08	41,973 ounces	1.99 g/t	
2008–09	34,766 ounces	1.5 g/t	
2009–10			
2010–11			
2011–12			
2012–13			
2013–14			
2014–15	19,496 ounces	0.9 g/t	A$1,593
2015–16	45,403 ounces	1.76 g/t	A$1,301
2016–17	78,912 ounces	2.75 g/t	A$1,100
2017–18			

=== Kalgoorlie Operations ===
Production figures for the combined Kalgoorlie Operations, which consist of the South Kalgoorlie mine and the Kanowna Belle Gold Mine. The Kundana Gold Mine and the East Kundana Joint Venture (51 percent Northern Star Resources ownership) were part of the Kalgoorlie Operations until sold in July 2021:

Year	Production	Grade	Cost per ounce
2018–19	334,527 ounces	3.8 g/t	A$1,330
2019–20	317,248 ounces	3.2 g/t	A$1,564
2020–21	256,657 ounces	3.1 g/t	A$1,942
2021–22	171,027 ounces	2.6 g/t	A$1,949
2022–23	163,679 ounces	2.8 g/t	A$1,876

== Notes ==
- ^[1]Production figure is for the combined Kalgoorlie Operations, which consist of the South Kalgoorlie mine and the Kanowna Belle Gold Mine. The Kundana Gold Mine and the East Kundana Joint Venture (51 percent Northern Star Resources ownership) were part of the Kalgoorlie Operations until sold in July 2021.
- ^[2]2007-08 figures are for Dioro ownership only, compromising the time from 1 December 2007 to 31 August 2008. Dioro's financial year runs from 1 September to 31 August.
- ^[3]Result for Harmony's combined Australian operations, consisting of South Kalgoorlie, the Hill 50 Gold Mine, the Big Bell Gold Mine (closed June 2003) and the Gidgee Gold Mine (sold in December 2003).
- ^[4]Figures for January to September 2002 only.
