= Beta Hunt Mine =

Nickel and gold mine in Western Australia

Beta Hunt
- Location within Western Australia
- Interactive map of Beta Hunt
- Location: Kambalda, Western Australia, Australia; 31.218°S 121.679°E
- Products: Gold
- Production: 79,125 ounces
- Financial year: 2021
- Type: underground
- Discovered: 1966
- Opened: 1973
- Active: 1973–2008, 2014–present
- Company: Karora Resources TSX: KRR
- Website: www.karoraresources.com/beta-hunt-mine
- Acquired: 2013

The Beta Hunt Mine is a nickel and gold mine near Kambalda in Western Australia. It is owned and operated by Canadian company Karora Resources through a subsidiary named Salt Lake Mining Pty Ltd. The mining tenement is held by Gold Fields and leased to Salt Lake Mining.

The mine is licensed to extract up to 480,000 kilolitres (17,000,000 cu ft) of water and discharge it into Lake Lefroy to maintain access to the mineral resources.

== History ==
The Beta Hunt Mine was originally a nickel mine, exploiting an ore body discovered in 1966. The mine opened in 1973 and produced 153,500 tonnes of nickel metal for WMC Resources by 1998.

The mine was sold to Gold Fields in 2001. Reliance Mining acquired the nickel rights in 2003 and was acquired by Consolidated Minerals in 2005.

The mine was placed into care and maintenance in 2008. It was acquired by Salt Lake Mining in 2013 after that company also secured gold mining rights. It resumed producing nickel in 2014 and started producing gold in November 2015.

In September 2018, a large deposit of gold-bearing quartz rock was discovered in the mine during routine blasting, 500 metres (1,600 ft) underground.

Nickel production is scheduled to resume at the mine from 2022, with Karora Resources aiming to produce up to 550 tonnes of nickel during the year. Nickel had last been produced at the mine in 2018, when 300 tonnes were mined. No nickel production was announced for 2022, although some mining for the commodity had taken place, but a guidance for 2023 for an intended nickel production of between 450 and 550 tonnes was announced in March 2023.

== Production ==
Recent annual production of the mine:

=== Gold ===
Year	Production	Cost per ounce
2016	23,002 ounces	
2017	35,307 ounces	
2018	62,233 ounces	
2019	47,642 ounces	A$958
2020	66,479 ounces	A$943
2021	78,476 ounces	A$840
2022	79,125 ounces	A$1,044

=== Nickel ===
Year	Production
2016	1,800 tonnes
2017	800 tonnes
2018	300 tonnes
2019–2022	0
