= Paddington Gold Mine =

Gold mine in Western Australia

Paddington
- Location in Western Australia
- Interactive map of Paddington
- Location: Broad Arrow, Western Australia, Australia; 30°29′23″S 121°21′06″E
- Products: Gold
- Production: 177,000 ounces
- Financial year: 2022
- Opened: 1985
- Company: Norton Gold Fields Limited
- Website: www.nortongoldfields.com.au
- Acquired: 2007

The Paddington Gold Mine is a gold mine located 5 km south of Broad Arrow, and 30 km north of Kalgoorlie, Western Australia.

It is operated by Norton Gold Fields Limited, having acquired the mine from Barrick Gold on 25 August 2007 for A$45 million.

== History ==
Gold mines in the Kalgoorlie region

The mine opened in 1985, under the ownership of Pancontinental Mining, mining ore in two open pit operations, the two original open pits being active until 2002. In 1994, the processing plant was upgraded to be able to handle 3.0 million tonnes of ore per annum.

AurionGold, the former Goldfields Limited, was taken over by Placer Dome Limited in January 2003. Placer Dome in turn was taken over by Barrick Gold in March 2006.

In 2007, the mining tenements were enlarged through the acquisition of the Mount Pleasant and Ora Banda properties. Shortly after, on 26 April 2007, Norton announced it had purchased the mine from Barrick Gold for A$45 million. It moved the small Kundana Plant, at the Kundana Gold Mine near Paddington and part of the sale, to its Mount Morgan Mine Project, near Rockhampton, Queensland.

Underground mining commenced in April 2009 with the cutting of a portal at Norton's Homestead deposit at Mount Pleasant, 18 km south-west of the Paddington mill, and is expected to deliver mill feed from December 2009 with a grade in excess of 6.0 g/t. Production performance of the mine was below plan in 2008-09, having been scheduled at 145,000 ounces and achieved only 137,000, because of shortfalls in the second half of 2008.

In August 2009, Norton signed an agreement with Curtin University of Technology’s Western Australian School of Mines (WASM) to establish cooperation in education, professional development, and research and development between WASM and the Paddington Gold Mine.

On 28 September 2009, two miners were seriously injured, having been pinned between the counterweight of an excavator and a wall in the plant area.

Following acquisition by Chinese company Zijin Mining, Norton Gold Fields Limited was delisted from the Australian Securities Exchange in July 2017.

== Production ==
Recent production of the mine:

Year	Production	Grade	Cost per ounce
1997–98	209,000 ounces	2.2 g/t	A$ 317
1998–99	162,000 ounces	2.2 g/t	A$400
1999–2000	132,000 ounces	2.7 g/t	A$352
2000–01	148,000 ounces	1.8 g/t	A$376
2001–02	225,000 ounces	2.3 g/t	A$383
2002–03	308,000 ounces	3.2 g/t	A$498
2003–04	244,000 ounces	2.6 g/t	A$478
2004–05	243,000 ounces	2.6 g/t	A$576
2005–06	259,000 ounces	2.9 g/t	A$501
2006–07	214,000 ounces	2.2 g/t	
2007–08	126,000 ounces	1.5 g/t	A$754
2008–09	135,067 ounces	1.45 g/t	A$791
2009–10	140,436 ounces		
2010–11			
2011–12			
2012–13			
2013–14			
2014–15			
2015–16			
2016–17	190,993 ounces	1.97 g/t	
2017			
2018			
2019			
2020	185,606 ounces		
2021			
2022	177,000 ounces		
