= Evolution Mining =

Mining company in Australia

Evolution Mining Ltd
- Type: Public company
- Traded as: ASX: EVN
- Founded: 2011 in Australia
- Headquarters: Sydney, Australia
- Areas served: Australia
- Key people: Jake Klein (Executive Chairman)
- Revenue: ▲ A$1,949.1 million (2020) (2020)
- Net income: ▲ A$405.3 million (2020)
- Total assets: ▲ A$3,674.6 million (2020) (2020)
- Number of employees: 2,099 (2020)
- Website: evolutionmining.com.au

Evolution Mining is an Australian gold mining company, established in 2011. Headquartered in Sydney, Australia. It is listed on the Australian Stock Exchange

Evolution owns and operates mines at Cowal and Northparkes, New South Wales; Mt Rawdon and Ernest Henry, Queensland; Mungari, Western Australia; and Red Lake, Ontario.

== Mine locations ==
The Cowal gold operation is an open-pit gold operation approximately 350km west of Sydney. Evolution's former Mt Carlton operation is approximately 150km south of Townsville, Queensland. The Mungari gold operation is approximately 600km east of Perth and 20km west of Kalgoorlie in Western Australia. The Ernest Henry copper-gold operation is operated by Glencore. It also operates the Red Lake mine, which is an underground gold mine in Northwestern Ontario, Canada.

The Mt. Rawdon open pit gold mine is approximately 75km south-west of Bundaberg, Queensland, and is planned for a pumped hydroelectric project, potentially using the Perry River Dam.

=== History ===
Evolution Mining was formed in November 2011 through the merger of Catalpa Resources and Conquest Mining and the concurrent acquisition of Newcrest Mining’s Cracow and Mt Rawdon gold mines.

In 2015, Evolution acquired Cowal and Mungari, and, in 2016, an economic interest in Ernest Henry. In 2020, Evolution divested Cracow and completed the acquisition of Red Lake. In 2021, the acquisition of Kundana assets elevated Mungari to a cornerstone asset and consolidates regional resources.

In 2022, Evolution acquired 100% of Ernest Henry and the Mount Rawdon Pumped Hydro Project was declared a Coordinated Project by the Queensland Government. In 2023, Evolution acquired Northparkes and, in 2024, the Cowal underground mine was successfully commissioned and went into commercial production.

In 2025, the Mungari mill expansion was completed ahead of schedule and under budget and the final regulatory approval received to extend Cowal Gold Operations to 2042. In 2026, Evolution entered into an agreement to acquire the Two Times Fred exploration project and a separate agreement that provides an option to acquire the Clisbako exploration project in British Columbia, Canada.

The company’s growth has seen it become a mid-tier Australian mining company and on the ASX top 50 Australian publicly listed companies.

In May 2021 the company acquired Toronto Stock Exchange-listed Battle North Gold for CAD$343 million for its Bateman (formerly Phoenix) gold project near Red Lake, Ontario.

== Naming rights agreements ==
In August 2025, the Goldfields Basketball Stadium in Kalgoorlie, Western Australia, was officially named Evolution Mining Stadium under a naming rights partnership between the Goldfields Basketball Association and Evolution Mining.
