= Coolgardie, Western Australia =

Coolgardie
- Town
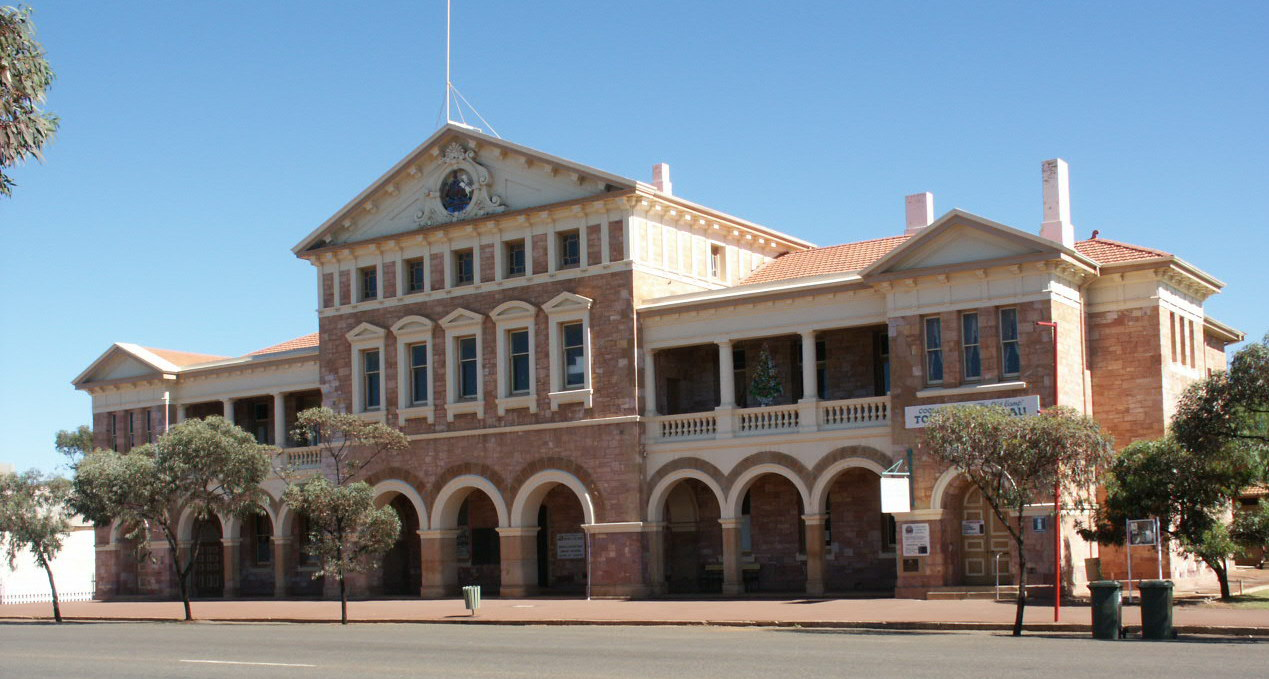
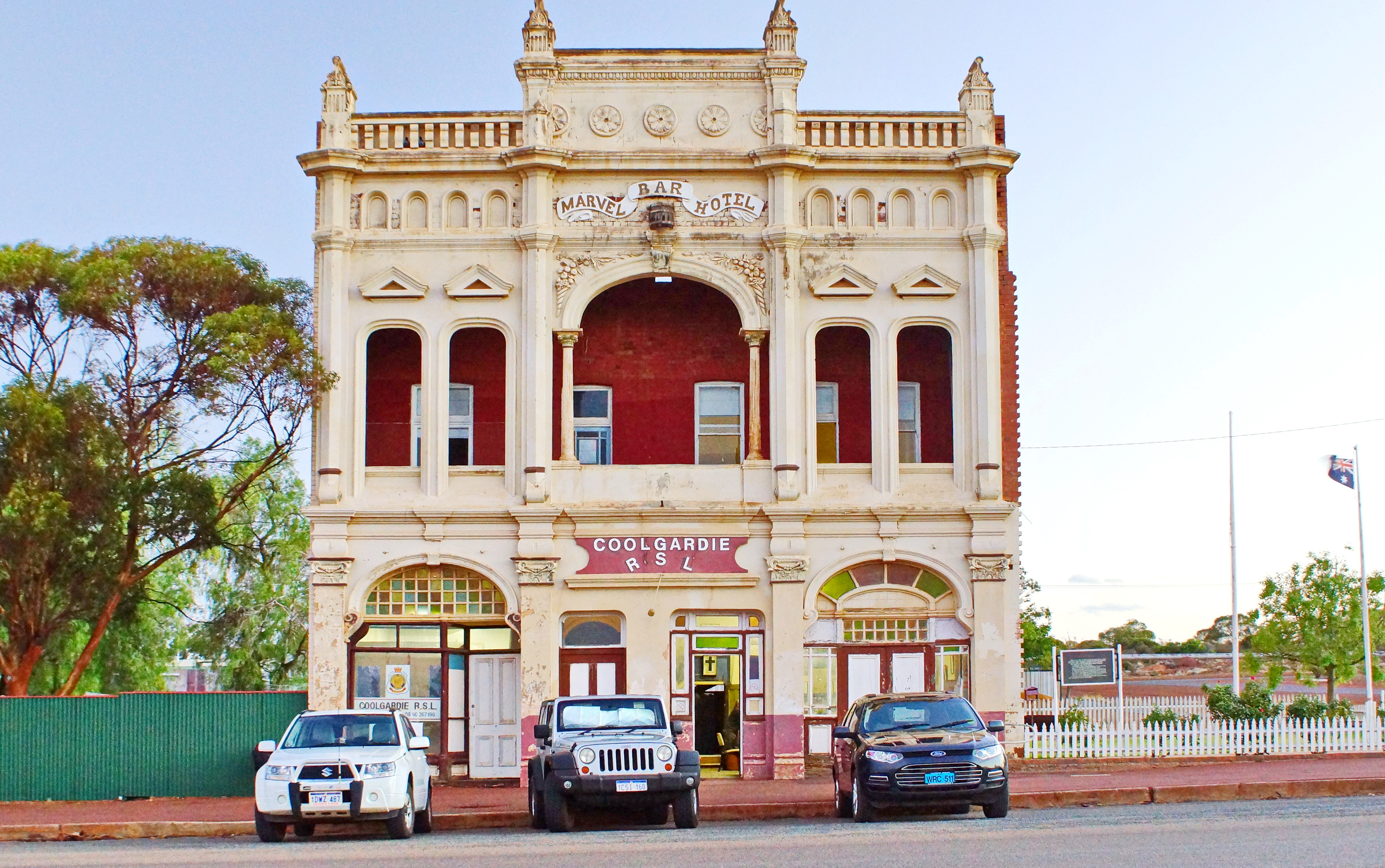
- Coolgardie Warden's Court Coolgardie Marvel Bar RSL

- Interactive map of Coolgardie
- Coordinates: 30.953°S 121.164°E
- Country: Australia
- State: Western Australia
- LGA: Shire of Coolgardie
- Location: 558 km (347 mi) ENE of Perth; 38 km (24 mi) SW of Kalgoorlie; 370 km (230 mi) NNW of Esperance
- Established: 1892

Government
  - State electorate: Kalgoorlie
  - Federal division: O'Connor

Area
  - Total: 125 km^{2} (48 sq mi)
- Elevation: 428 m (1,404 ft)

Population
  - Total: 763 (UCL 2021)
- Postcode: 6429

Coolgardie is a small town in Western Australia located around 558 kilometres (347 mi) east of the state capital, Perth; and 38 kilometres (24 mi) southwest of Kalgoorlie. It has a population of approximately 850 people.

Although Coolgardie is now known to most Western Australians as a tourist town and a mining ghost town, it was once the third largest town in Western Australia (after Perth and Fremantle). At this time, mining of alluvial gold was a major industry and supplied the flagging economy with new hope. Many miners suffered under the harsh conditions, but for a few, their find made the hard work worthwhile. Most men, however, left poorer than they had started off, with their hopes dashed.

== History ==
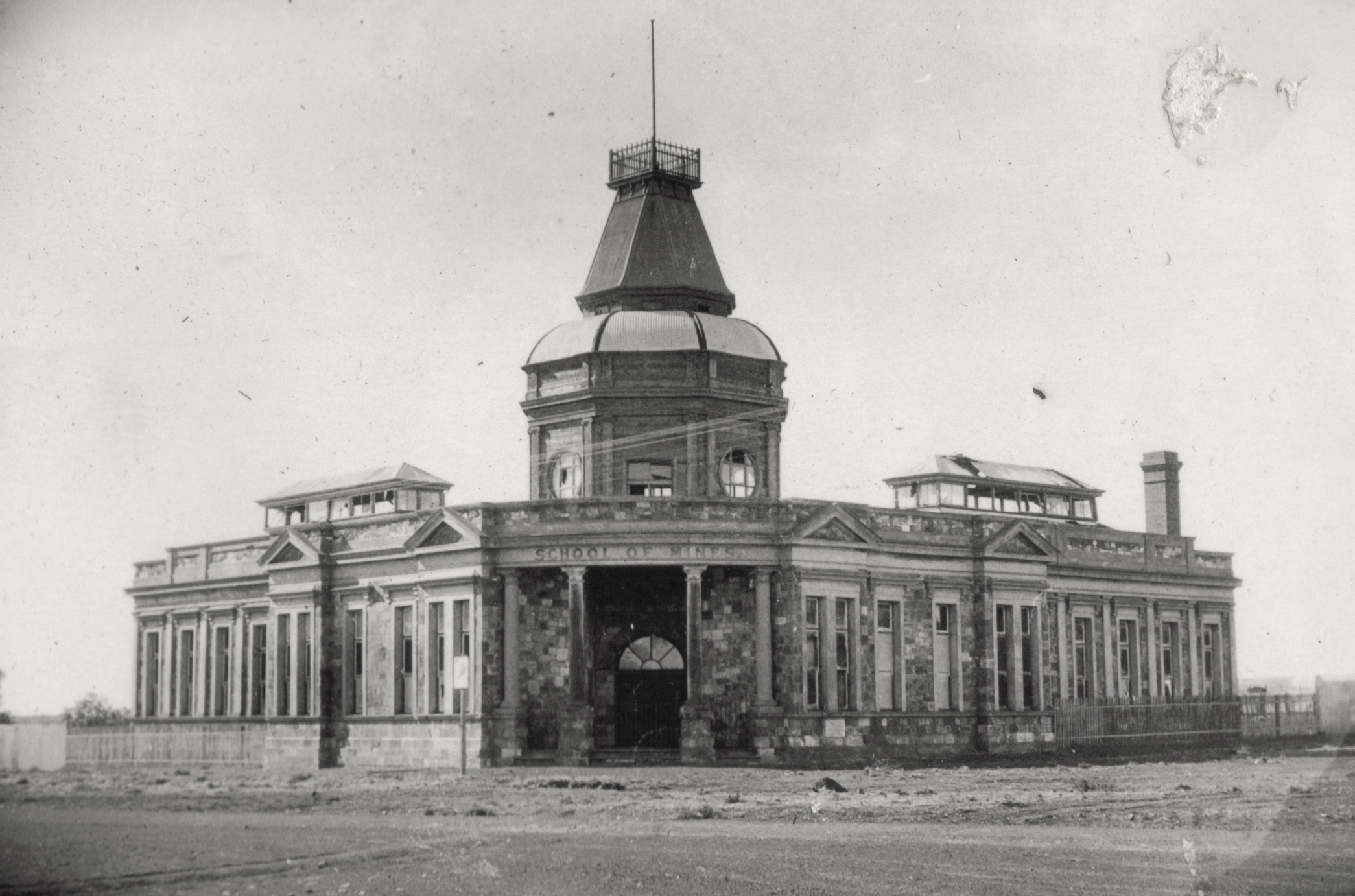
Coolgardie School of Mines

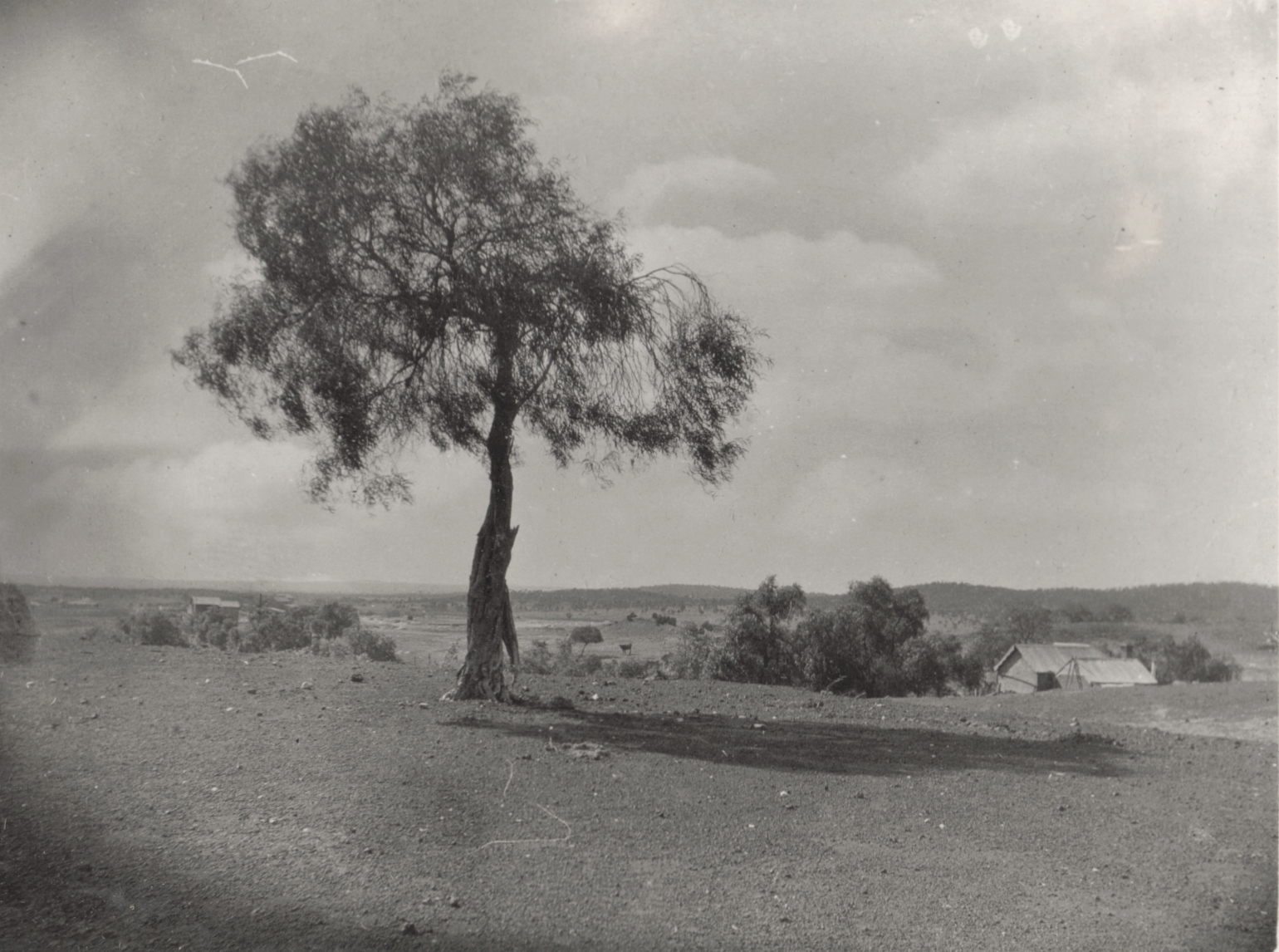
Coolgardie, Western Australia, 15 March 1928 (f16)

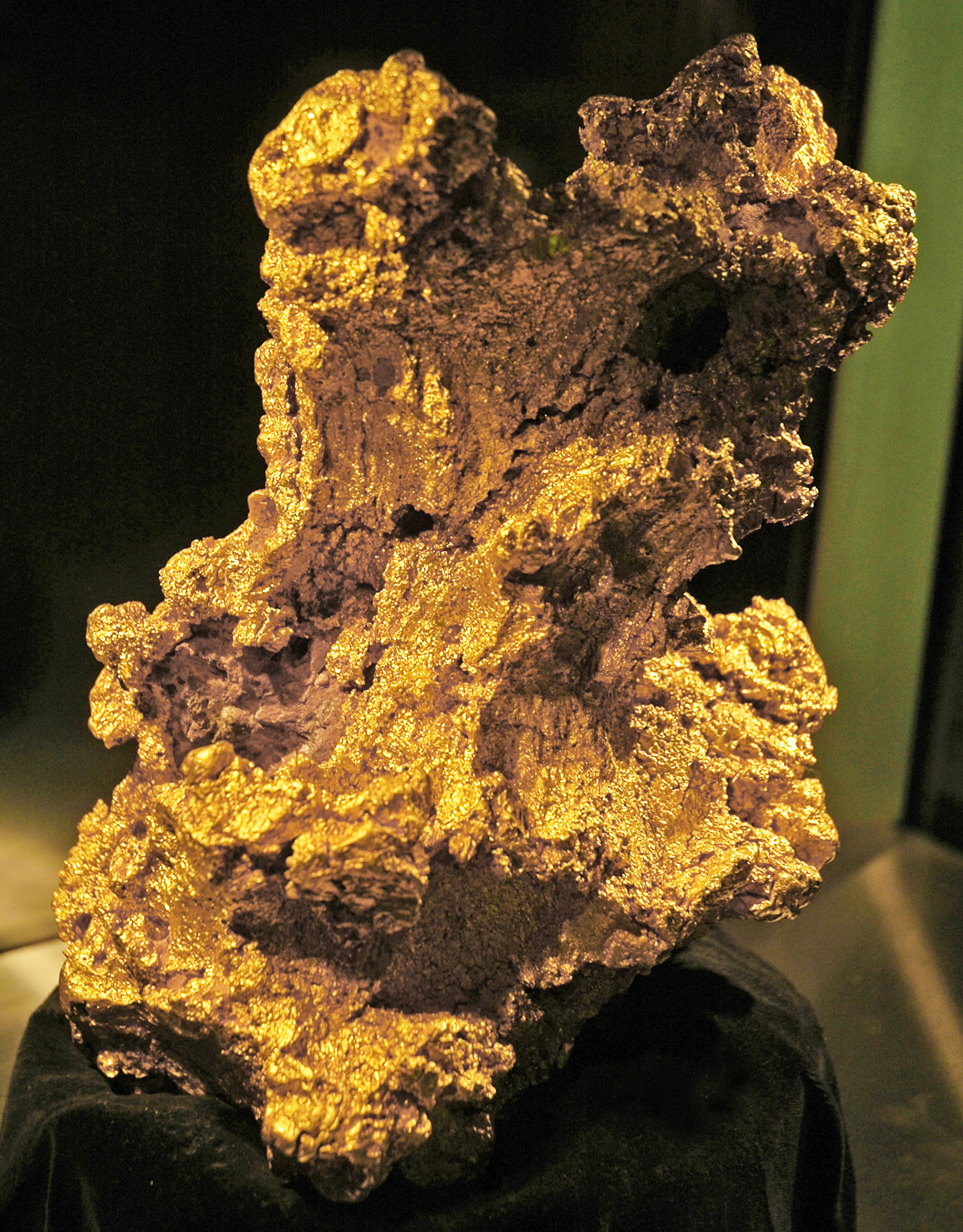
King of the West or Normandy Nugget, at 25.5 kilograms (820 troy ounces) the world’s second largest existing nugget, found in a creek bed at Coolgardie, 1995

Coolgardie was founded in 1892, when gold was discovered in the area known as Fly Flat by prospectors Arthur Wellesley Bayley and William Ford. Australia had seen several major gold rushes over the previous three decades, mostly centred on the east coast, but these had mostly been exhausted by the 1890s. With the discovery of a new goldfield, an entire new gold rush began, with thousands flocking to the area. The Municipality of Coolgardie was established in 1894. By 1898, Coolgardie was the third largest town in the colony, with an estimated population of 15,000 At its peak, 700 mining companies based in Coolgardie were registered with the London Stock Exchange. The town also supported a wide variety of businesses and services, including the railway connection between Perth and Kalgoorlie, a swimming pool (first public baths in the state), many hotels and several newspapers.

The value of Coolgardie to the colony in the late 1890s was so significant that it was used as leverage to force Western Australia to join the Australian federation. Britain and the eastern colonies threatened to create a new state to be named Auralia around Coolgardie and other regional goldfields, such as Kalgoorlie, if the government in Perth did not agree to hold a referendum on federation. The Western Australian government reluctantly complied and a referendum was held just in time to become a founding state in the new federation. When federation did occur in 1901, Coolgardie was the centre of a federal electorate, the Division of Coolgardie. Soon after in November 1901, Alf Morgans from the state electorate of Coolgardie briefly became Premier of Western Australia. Albert Thomas, also of Coolgardie, was elected the first Member of Dundas, an electoral division south of Coolgardie.

However, the gold began to decrease in the early 1900s, and by World War I, the town was in serious decline. The federal electorate was abolished in 1913 due to the diminished population, as many of its residents left for other towns where the gold was still plentiful, and it soon ceased to be a municipality. The situation remained unchanged throughout the century, as its population slipped to around 200 and it became a virtual ghost town. An example of this decline is that, in March 1896, Coolgardie's main street was lit by an electric light, but by April 1924, the same street was lit by four hurricane lamps.

Despite this, many of the buildings from the town's peak were retained, which in recent years has helped start a small revival in the town's fortunes. The development of a tourist industry has once again created some employment in the town, resulting in a small increase in population. Coolgardie appears to be no longer in danger of dying.

=== Gallery ===
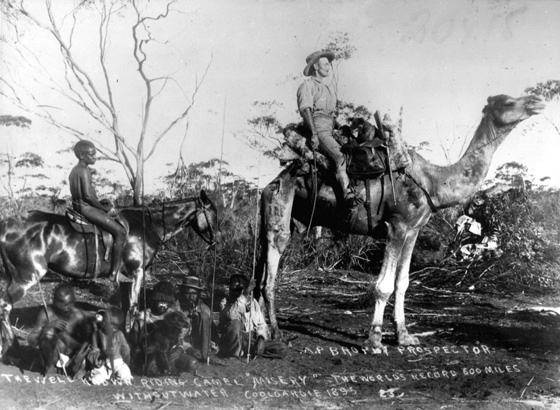
Prospector riding "Misery", a famous camel that travelled a record 970 kilometres (600 mi) without water, 1895

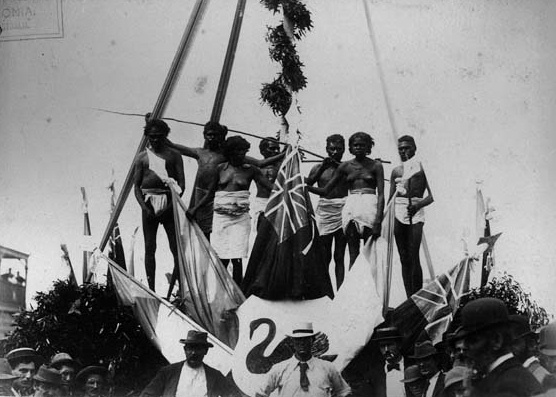
Aboriginal people participate in ceremony to mark the opening of the Coolgardie Railway Line, 1896

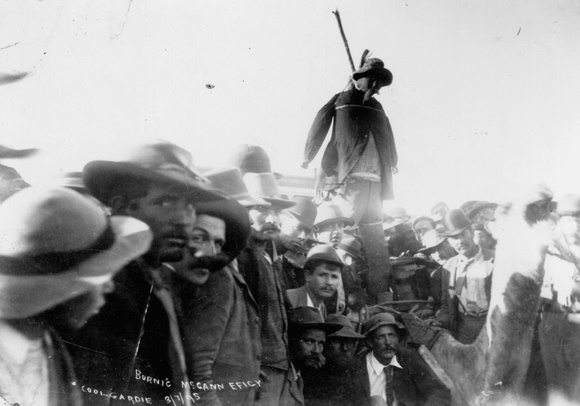
Miners burn effigy of prospector who lied about gold discovery near Coolgardie, 1897

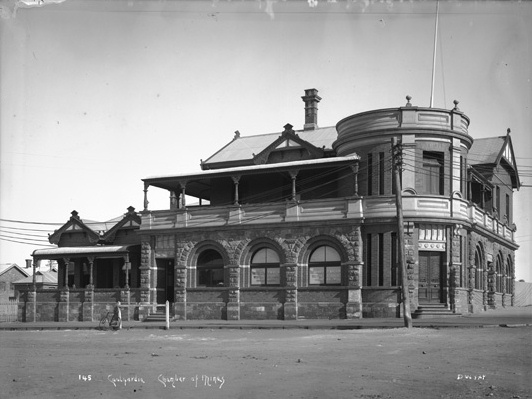
Coolgardie Chamber of Mines, c. 1900

=== Muslim Afghan cameleers ===
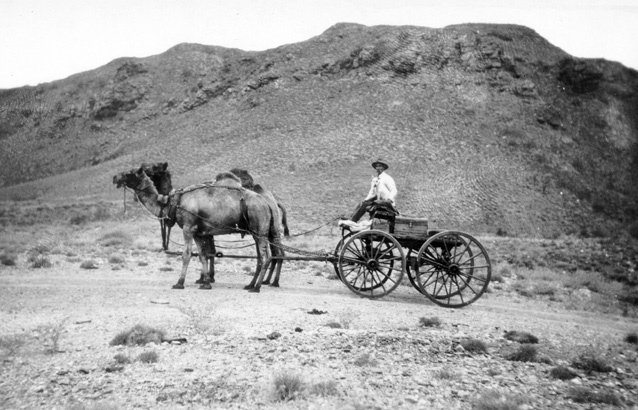
Camel team, Coolgardie c. 1900

When the Coolgardie gold rush occurred in 1894, the Afghan cameleers (so-called, although not all were from Afghanistan) were quick to move in and provide transport for much-needed supplies. In March that year, a caravan of six men, forty-seven camels and eleven calves, set out across the desert from Marree to the goldfield. It arrived in July with the camels, carrying between 135 and 270 kilograms (298 and 595 lb) each, in good condition. Another fifty-eight camels for Coolgardie arrived by ship in Albany in September.

By 1898 there were 300 members of this Muslim community in Coolgardie and 80 on average attended Friday prayer. Coolgardie held the main Muslim community in the colony at that time. There were no women amongst them, no marriages were performed and no burials, reflecting a relatively young and transient population. As with other structures in the town, simple mud and tin-roofed mosques were initially constructed. All of the community eventually relocated from Coolgardie generally to Perth, the new capital of Western Australia. Their success occasionally attracted resentment, with reports of unsolved attacks on animals.

== Transport ==
Great Eastern Highway (National Highway 94) runs through the town as Bayley Street. Just to the town's east, Highway 94 turns south onto Coolgardie-Esperance Highway, which heads towards Norseman, the starting point of the route east across the Nullarbor Plain.

Originally the narrow gauge railway to Kalgoorlie, the Eastern Goldfields Railway passed through Coolgardie, until 1968, when the new standard gauge line was built to the north on a new route.

Transwa's Prospector stops 14 kilometres (8.7 mi) north of the town at Bonnie Vale. There is a very limited public bus service to the town on the Kalgoorlie to Perth route, although school bus services are more frequent.

== Climate ==
Climate data for Coolgardie
Month	Jan	Feb	Mar	Apr	May	Jun	Jul	Aug	Sep	Oct	Nov	Dec	Year
Mean daily maximum °C (°F)	33.3 (91.9)	32.3 (90.1)	29.4 (84.9)	24.9 (76.8)	20.3 (68.5)	16.9 (62.4)	16.1 (61.0)	18.1 (64.6)	22.0 (71.6)	25.1 (77.2)	29.3 (84.7)	32.3 (90.1)	25.0 (77.0)
Mean daily minimum °C (°F)	17.0 (62.6)	16.8 (62.2)	15.1 (59.2)	12.0 (53.6)	8.6 (47.5)	6.5 (43.7)	5.2 (41.4)	5.9 (42.6)	7.9 (46.2)	10.2 (50.4)	13.4 (56.1)	15.8 (60.4)	11.2 (52.2)
Average precipitation mm (inches)	23.4 (0.92)	27.5 (1.08)	25.3 (1.00)	21.7 (0.85)	28.0 (1.10)	28.8 (1.13)	23.8 (0.94)	23.6 (0.93)	13.6 (0.54)	16.0 (0.63)	16.4 (0.65)	17.1 (0.67)	265.2 (10.44)
Average rainy days (≥ 1 mm)	2	2.1	2.5	2.7	3.7	4.3	4.5	3.7	2.4	2.2	2.1	1.9	34.1
Average afternoon relative humidity (%) (at 3 pm)	23	25	29	37	42	48	47	39	28	24	23	21	32
Source: (temperatures 1897-1953, humidity 1938-1953, rainfall 1893-2024)

== Goldfields ==
In the 1890s four goldfields were gazetted with Coolgardie as reference point:

- Coolgardie Goldfield (1894)
- East Coolgardie Goldfield (1894)
- North Coolgardie Goldfield (1895)
- North-east Coolgardie Goldfield (1896)

Despite the changes to the Kalgoorlie region, Coolgardie still has a Mining Registrar.

== In popular culture ==
The Denver City Hotel was the setting for the 2016 documentary Hotel Coolgardie, while the town itself was used as the setting for the fictional town of Jardine in the 2022 mini-series Mystery Road: Origin.

== See also ==
- Rescue of Modesto Varischetti from a nearby Bonnie Vale in 1907
- Burbanks Gold Mine
- Coolgardie Gold Mine
- Coolgardie safe
- Carnegie expedition of 1896
