= Higginsville, Western Australia =

Higginsville
- Town
- Interactive map of Higginsville
- Coordinates: 31°45′00″S 121°43′00″E
- Country: Australia
- State: Western Australia
- LGA: Shire of Coolgardie
- Location: 750 km (470 mi) E of Perth; 58 km (36 mi) N of Norseman
- Established: 1907

Government
  - State electorate: Eyre
  - Federal division: O'Connor

Area
  - Total: 1,025.4 km^{2} (395.9 sq mi)

Population
  - Total: 19 (SAL 2021)
- Postcode: 6443

Higginsville is a town in the Goldfields-Esperance Region of Western Australia. According to the 2016 census, Higginsville had a population of 66.

The town was gazetted in 1907 and is believed to have been named after the prospector Patrick Justice Higgins.

The town is located on the Esperance branch railway, west of Lake Cowan. The currently active Higginsville Gold Mine is located nearby.

== See also ==
- Higginsville Gold Mine
