= Higginsville Gold Mine =

Gold mine in Western Australia

Higginsville
- Location in Western Australia
- Interactive map of Higginsville
- Location: Higginsville, Western Australia, Australia; 31°44′04″S 121°43′27″E
- Products: Gold
- Production: 54,763 ounces
- Financial year: 2022
- Opened: 2008 (reopened)
- Company: Karora Resources TSX: KRR
- Website: www.karoraresources.com/higginsville-mining
- Acquired: 2019

The Higginsville Gold Mine is a gold mine located near Higginsville, 45 km north of Norseman, Western Australia.

The mine has been owned and operated by Westgold since 2024 (Westgold merged with Karora Resources who had owned the mine from 2019 - 2024) and is one of five mines operated by the company in Western Australia.

== History ==
Gold mines in the Kalgoorlie region

The Higginsville mine was in operation in the 1990s, with its mill ceasing work in October 1997. Mining continued until early 2000, with ore being milled at the Chalice Gold Mine. At that time, the mine was owned by the St Ives Gold Mining Company, a subsidiary of Gold Fields, which had also purchased the nearby St Ives Gold Mine from WMC Resources in 2001.

In 2002, Avoca Resources Limited listed on the Australian Securities Exchange and paid A$6.25 million to Gold Fields for its Higginsville exploration project in June 2004. After discovering the Trident deposit in late 2004, Avoca raised $125 million in April 2007 to build a new mine at Higginsville. Also in 2007, Avoca purchased the neighbouring Chalice deposit from Chalice Gold Mines Limited. Gold production at the mine began in 2008 from underground operations, with the first gold pour on 1 July 2008.

Avoca has made headlines in 2009 when it became engaged in a bitter dispute with Ramelius Resources over conflicting takeover bids for Dioro Exploration NL. Avoca eventually had to drop its bid for Dioro, having reached a 44.85% interest in Dioro at the close of the offer on 20 August, short of the 50% needed. Ramelius's offer for the company closes on 8 February 2010. Avoca made a renewed takeover offer for the company in late December 2009. Avoca eventually succeeded in its bid for Dioro and, on 21 April 2010, Dioro was delisted from the ASX.

Avoca, owner of the mine at the time, merged in with Anatolia Minerals Development Limited in 2011 to form Alacer Gold. Alacer Gold, in turn, sold its Australian operations, consisting of Higginsville and the South Kalgoorlie Gold Mine, to Metals X in September 2013 for A$40 million. Metals X took ownership of the mine on 1 October 2013 and operated it through its subsidiary Westgold. In 2016, Metals X and Westgold de-merged, with the latter retaining ownership of the gold mining operations, including Higginsville.

In June 2019, the mine was acquired by Canadian company RNC Minerals from its previous owner, Westgold Resources for A$50 million, half of which was paid in cash and the remainder in shares. RNC Minerals, at the time, already owned the nearby Beta Hunt Mine. RNC Minerals changed its name to Karora Resources in June 2020.

Westgold merged with Karora Resources in August of 2024. The merger between Westgold Resources and Karora Resources involved Westgold acquiring all of Karora's shares. This created a larger, globally investable, mid-tier gold producer operating exclusively in Western Australia. The combined entity was expected to be a top five Australian gold producer, capable of producing over 400,000 ounces of gold per annum, with a pro forma market capitalization of approximately A$2.5 billion. The merger also aimed to create synergies, with potential cost savings of over A$200 million.

== Production ==
Recent annual production of the mine:

Year	Production	Cost per ounce
2015	131,406 ounces	
2016	91,371 ounces	
2017	84,595 ounces	
2018	55,958 ounces	
2019	16,635 ounces	A$1,136
2020	32,770 ounces	A$886
2021	34,338 ounces	A$1,092
2022	54,763 ounces	A$1,179

== Sources ==
- Place Names Search Results - Higginsville Geoscience Australia
- The Australian Mines Handbook: 2003-2004 Edition, Louthean Media, Editor: Ross Louthean
- Western Australian Mineral and Petroleum Statistics Digest 2008 p. 34: Principal Mineral and Petroleum Producers - Gold
