= Care and maintenance =

Mining industry term

Care and maintenance is a term used in the mining industry to describe processes and conditions on a closed mine site at which there is the potential to recommence operations at a later date. During the care and maintenance phase, production is stopped but the site is managed to ensure it remains in a safe and stable condition.

== Causes ==
The mine might be considered to be temporarily unviable, due to current economic conditions or unfavourable resource prices, which are expected to improve at a later date.

Declining ore grades at some mines can also be a reason for care and maintenance announcements.

In some cases controlling interest companies decide not to provide further funding for subsidiary operations.

== During closure ==
While the mine is closed, a care and maintenance program will manage environmental risks associated with tailings dumps, hazardous materials and open and underground pits. Care of idle plant and machinery will also be included in the program. Public health and safety considerations and emergency response plans continue during the care and maintenance phase.

Some countries have legislative frameworks to ensure care and maintenance programs are in place before granting mine "closure certificates".

A later decision to permanently close the mine may result in mine reclamation.

== See also ==
- Mine closure
- Mine closure planning
