= Robert Champion de Crespigny =

Australian businessman

Robert James Champion de Crespigny, AC (born 1950) is a multi-millionaire Australian businessman and founder of Normandy Mining. Currently estimated with his ownership in PBE and Rutherford corporations his net worth is near AUD$1bn. In 2004 his personal wealth was approximately AUS$170 million. His positions in corporate and public life include chancellor of the University of Adelaide (2000–2004) and chair of the South Australian Economic Development Board (2002–2006) and a role on the South Australian Minerals & Petroleum Expert Group (SAMPEG) for the Department of State Development. He resides in the United Kingdom.

== Career ==
Champion de Crespigny was educated at Melbourne Grammar School and the University of Melbourne, from which he graduated with a Bachelor of Commerce degree. During his university studies, he was resident at Trinity College. He subsequently qualified as a Chartered Accountant and practised for 13 years with KMG Hungerford in Perth, Western Australia. He was a partner at the firm for 10 years.

=== Mining ===
In October 1985, he left the accounting profession and formed Normandy Mining. He remained its executive chairman through its 17 years of activity. In 1988, Champion de Crespigny and his family moved to Adelaide, South Australia when it took control of Poseidon Limited. Normandy was taken over by Newmont in 2002 but he and his family remained in Adelaide.

In early 1999, Normandy made an offer for Great Central Mines, a company led by the ordained Rabbi Joseph Gutnick, through Yandal Gold, a company in which it owned a 49.9% interest. This offer came under investigation from the Australian Securities & Investments Commission, which demanded a termination of the offer on 23 March 1999. Gutnick and Crespigny were found to have illegally structured a takeover of the company and Gutnick was ordered to return $28.5 million to investors. The court found that their behaviour in jointly bidding $450 million earlier that year for Great Central Mines was unlawful and deceptive. Both Gutnick and Crespigny had shareholdings in GMC before this bid was launched, and they agreed together to form the Yandal Gold company. The court found however, that it was only Gutnick who received any benefit and it was therefore he who had to pay the $28.5 million.

The deal nevertheless went ahead and brought the Bronzewing, Jundee and Wiluna Gold Mines to the company.

In September 2001, at the start of the AngloGold - Newmont takeover war for Normandy, Champion de Crespigny warned that Australia could lose control of more gold assets because of a lack of support from local institutional investors. He argued for the support of Western Mining, should his own company fall to foreign investment.

Champion de Crespigny sits on a number of company boards, including serving as chairman of market research firm C|T Group. In February 2010, Barclays Capital announced that de Crespigny had joined the advisory panel of its natural resource investment business.

Champion de Crespigny has furthered the interests of the resources sector through his membership of various associations. These include the Australian Gold Council (chairman), the World Gold Council, the Minerals Council of Australia and the Business Council of Australia. At the invitation of Premier Mike Rann of South Australia, he chaired the South Australian Economic Development Board from 2002 until 2006. He also served on the executive committee of Cabinet of the Government of South Australia. As of 2014, de Crespigny continues to serve on the South Australian Minerals & Petroleum Expert Group (SAMPEG) for the Department of State Development which provides advice to the Government of South Australia.

=== Other associations ===
His membership of arts and cultural associations include the Council for Aboriginal Reconciliation, the National Gallery of Australia Council, the Commonwealth Expert Group on Democracy and Development and the South Australian Museum. De Crespigny was the chair of the board of the South Australian Museum from 1992 to 2002. Champion de Crespigny was the thirteenth chancellor of the University of Adelaide from 1 June 2000 until 26 July 2004. In January 2014, de Crespigny was announced as Patron of 'Believe – The Campaign for the University of Melbourne.'

== Honours ==
In 2002, Champion de Crespigny was awarded the Companion of the Order of Australia for his service to the mining industry, to business and to the community in the areas of cultural preservation and education. He was also in the same year awarded the South Australian Director of the Year by the Australian Institute of Company Directors and South Australian of the Year for 2002 by SA Great. He was honoured by having the mineral Decrespignyite-(Y) named after him in 2002, for his contributions to Australian education, the South Australian Museum and in the Australian mining industry. In 1993 he was awarded Australian Businessman of the Year.

== Family ==
His cousin is pilot Richard de Crespigny.

== See also ==
- French Australian
- Crespigny
