= Duketon Gold Project =

Gold mining operation in Western Australia

- Location of the Garden Well Plant of the Duketon Gold Project in Western Australia
- Interactive map of Duketon Gold Project

Location
- Location: Laverton, Western Australia, Australia; 27°53′51″S 122°21′44″E

Production
- Products: Gold
- Production: 327,000 ounces
- Financial year: 2022–23

History
- Opened: 2010

Owner
- Company: Regis Resources
- Website: regisresources.com.au

The Duketon Gold Project is a gold mining operation located between 100 km (62 mi) and 130 km (81 mi) north of Laverton. It is owned by the Australian mining company Regis Resources.

The Duketon Gold Project consists of two operation centres: the Duketon North Operations, consisting of the Moolart Well Gold Mine, and the Duketon South Operations, consisting of the Garden Well Gold Mine and the Rosemont Gold Mine, all located within a 30 km (19 mi) radius from each other.

Apart from the Duketon Gold Project, Regis Resources also holds a 30 percent stake in the Tropicana Gold Mine, having acquired it in May 2021 for A$903 million.

== Overview ==
Gold mines in the Mid West region

The Duketon North Operations, with the Moolart Well Gold Mine, consists of a number of open pit operations which feed a crusher and a ball mill.

The Duketon South Operations' Garden Well Gold Mine consists of a number of open pit operations and an underground operation which commenced in 2021. All feed into a crushing circuit and a ball mill. The Rosemont Gold Mine also consist of open pit and underground operations and a crushing circuit and a ball mill, with the slurry from there pumped to Garden Well for final processing. In the 2020–21 financial year, Duketon South accounted for just over 75 percent of the Duketon Gold Project's annual production while Duketon North accounted for the remainder.

== History ==
The Rosemont mine, located 9 km (5.6 mi) north of Garden Well, was discovered in 1980 by Aurora Gold, which carried out small-scale open pit mining during the 1990s, producing 18,600 ounces of gold. Regis Resources acquired the project in 2006. Mining at Rosemont commenced in November 2012. After construction cost of A$55 million, commercial production at the mine commenced in January 2014.

The Moolart Well deposit was discovered in 2001, and mining commenced in 2010. The mine was constructed at a cost of A$67 million. In 2005, in order to further the Moolart Well development, Newmont took up a 47 percent interest in Regis, replacing Joseph Gutnick as the main shareholder in the company, whose share went from 42 to 20 percent. Newmont eventually sold the final 20 percent of this stake in March 2016.

The deposit of the Garden Well mine was first discovered in 2008, being the largest gold discovery in the Duketon Greenstone Belt, and construction of the mine began in 2011. Mining at Garden Well began in September 2011 and the process plant of the mine commenced operations in August 2012. Construction of the camp and process plant cost A$102 million, with A$72 million of this financed by the Macquarie Bank.

In 2015, Regis announced a combined one million ounces of gold produced at the Duketon Gold Project since production commenced in 2010.

In August 2019, Regis acquired A$25 million of gold tenements in the area from exploration company Duketon Mining, increasing its stake of gold rights in the Duketon Greenstone Belt to 90 percent.

== Production ==
Annual production of the mine:

Year	Production	Grade	Cost per ounce
2010–11	81,000 ounces	1.40 g/t	
2011–12	105,000 ounces	1.39 g/t	A$585
2012–13	269,000 ounces		
2013–14	272,000 ounces		
2014–15	310,000 ounces	1.11 g/t	A$994
2015–16	305,000 ounces	1.03 g/t	A$927
2016–17	324,000 ounces	1.11 g/t	A$945
2017–18	361,000 ounces	1.19 g/t	A$901
2018–19	363,000 ounces	1.27 g/t	A$1,029
2019–20	352,000 ounces	1.25 g/t	A$1,246
2020–21	356,000 ounces	1.27 g/t	A$1,336
2021–22	316,000 ounces	1.2 g/t	A$1,684
2022–23	327,000 ounces	1.29 g/t	A$1,989
