= Diggers & Dealers =

Annual mining conference in Kalgoorlie

- Begins: 3 August 2026
- Ends: 5 August 2026
- Frequency: Annual
- Locations: Kalgoorlie, Western Australia
- Years active: 34
- Inaugurated: 1992
- Founder: Geoffrey Stokes
- Most recent: 4–6 August 2025
- Participants: Australian mining industry
- Attendance: 2,650 (2023)
- Website: www.diggersndealers.com.au

Diggers & Dealers is an annual mining conference held in Kalgoorlie, Western Australia. First held in 1992, today it is attended by over 2,500 delegates. As of 2023, a three-day pass to the conference costs $2,250, while a one-day pass costs $1,110.

== History ==
Ron Wise was a founder of the annual Diggers & Dealers event in Kalgoorlie.

=== 1992 ===
The annual conference was initiated by Palace Hotel, Kalgoorlie proprietor Geoffrey Stokes in 1992, with the first conference attended by 10 delegates.

=== 2009 ===
The 2009 conference was held during the Global Recession, with 12,000 jobs having been lost in the Australian mining industry in the previous eight months. Despite this, Western Australian mining recovered much better than most, and the general mood was "upbeat", unlike in the previous year.

=== 2010 ===
The event, usually non-political and mining orientated, was overshadowed by the 2010 Australian federal election, held less than three weeks later. It was dominated by discussion about the unpopular Mineral Resource Rent Tax, newly introduced by the Gillard government, which was seen as disadvantaging the smaller mining companies and favouring the larger ones like BHP, Rio Tinto and Xstrata. The conferences chairman, Barry Eldridge, predicted the political backlash for the government already before the conference.

The conference stretches Kalgoorlie's abilities to accommodate all delegates to the extreme. Rooms are often booked out two years in advance, with nightly rates rising by 150% during the conference. Local residents are encouraged to rent out their houses during the event and leave town. A three-bedroom house can fetch several thousand dollars for three days.

In 2010, the three-day program consisted of presentations by major and minor mining companies, especially gold miners. In 2010, AngloGold Ashanti, through CEO Mark Cutifani, Barrick Gold, through Gary Halverson, President Asia Pacific and Fortescue, represented by CEO Andrew Forrest, were some of the major presenters.

Another outcome of the 2010 conference was the recognition that mining had to lift its profile nationally and to advertise better its record on "job creation, relations with indigenous people and its environmental record".

=== After the mining boom ===
Despite a downturn in mining in 2015 the event was still held.

== Awards ==
Annually, the conference hands out a number of awards for achievements in the mining industry. Since 1997, the G.J. Stokes Memorial Award, the Digger Award and the Dealer Award are awarded. In 2003, a Media Award was added and in 2007, a Best Emerging Company award. Former award winners include Joseph Gutnick (1997), the only individual to win the Digger Award, and Robert Champion de Crespigny, former CEO of Normandy Mining.

=== GJ Stokes Memorial award ===
Named after the Diggers & Dealers founder and awarded to a long time servant of the mining industry

1997 - Arvi Parbo

1998 - Ian Burston

1999 - Charles Court

2000 - Roy Woodall

2001 - not awarded

2002 - David Reed

2003 - Trevor Sykes

2004 - Laurence Brodie-Hall

2005 - Peter Newton

2006 - Graeme Smith, George Botica, Barry Paterson & Ron Harken

2007 - Pierre Lassonde

2008 - Owen Hegarty

2009 - Nick Giorgetta

2010 - David Moore

2011 - George Jones

2012 - Geoff Loudon

2013 - Andrew Forrest

2014 - Jim Walker

2015 - Mark Cutifani

2016 - Christopher Bonwick

2017 - Jim Askew

2018 - Ron Sayers

2019 - Mark Creasy

2020 - Gina Rinehart

2021 - Steve Coughlan

2022 - Tim Goyder

2023 - Neil Warburton
