= Joseph Gutnick =

Australian businessman

Joseph Isaac "Diamond Joe" Gutnick (born June 1952; Hebrew: יוסף יצחק הכהן גוטניק) is an Australian businessman, mining industry entrepreneur and the former president of the Melbourne Football Club (1996–2001). He is also an ordained Orthodox rabbi, and is well known for his philanthropy in the Jewish world. He declared bankruptcy in July 2016.

== Early life ==
Gutnick's father, Rabbi Shneur Chaim HaKohen Gutnick, was born in Zolotonosha, Ukraine, in 1921. He studied at the Telshe yeshiva in Lithuania until 1940 when the country was annexed by the Soviet Union and, via the far east, came to Cairns, Australia in 1941. After serving in the Australian Army until 1944 Gutnick married Rose Chester in 1945 and the couple had two daughters and four sons together: Channah, Peninah, Rabbi Mordechai Gutnick, Rabbi Moshe Gutnick, Avraham, and Joseph. Joseph Gutnick was born in 1952. His father died in 2003 after an influential life in the Australian Jewish community, having become president of the Rabbinical Council of Victoria in 1967.

== Israeli politics ==
Gutnick became close with Israeli Prime Minister Benjamin Netanyahu in his role as the Rebbe's Special Emissary for the Integrity of the Land of Israel. In the 1990s, Gutnick spent millions of dollars campaigning for Netanyahu and against the Labor Party in Israel's elections to try to prevent the Israeli Government giving up land, which the Rebbe said would never help achieve peace.

== Business career ==
After almost having been ruined by the 1987 stock market crash, Gutnick was advised by Rabbi Menachem Schneerson to go back to the Australian desert and search for "gold and diamonds". He was responsible for overseeing the discovery of the Plutonic gold deposit, as well as the discovery, development and operation of the Bronzewing and Jundee gold mines in Australia. Gutnick also was a director of the World Gold Council and was awarded the inaugural Diggers Award at the 1997 Diggers and Dealers Industry Awards.

In 1991, his company, Great Central Mines, paid A$115 million to prospector Mark Creasy for the Bronzewing gold deposit. In 1999, Gutnick along with partner Robert Champion de Crespigny was found to have illegally structured a takeover of Great Central Mining. Gutnick was ordered to return $28.5 million to investors. Gutnick appealed the decision and the decision was vacated for lack of jurisdiction. Gutnick expressed confidence that he could have won on the merits too, had that been necessary. On 5 April 2000, Joseph Gutnick, Robert Champion de Crespigny and Ian Gould resigned as directors of Great Central Mining.

From 1987, Gutnick served as a director of Regis Resources, at times taking on the role of managing director and chairman, which he held until August 2004, when he resigned from all board positions. As part of this leadership change, Gutnick also relinquished some of the company's depth as well as reducing his stake in the company from 65 percent to below 20.

In January 2014 it was announced that Blackham Resources, of which Gutnick is the chairman, had acquired the Wiluna Gold Mine, a mine which Great Central Mines, under his leadership, held from 1997 to 2000. The mine was purchased from APEX Minerals, a company in receivership since June 2013, whose chairman at the time was Eduard Eshuys. Coincidentally, Eshuys was also in charge of the drilling program that discovered Plutonic for Gutnick. Gutnick had become chairman of Blackham on 4 February 2013 when his private company, Great Central Gold, invested A$13.32 million in Blackham.

=== Holdings ===
Among Gutnick's business holdings:

- Legend International Holdings. A mining company focused on phosphate exploration in Queensland, Australia. Gutnick is the president and CEO.
- Centaur Mining went into receivership during 2001. Gutnick was the president and CEO.
- Top End Minerals. Executive Chairman. CEO.
- Quantum Resources Ltd. Chairman. Managing Director. now called Nova minerals

=== Landmark defamation case ===
Gutnick sued Dow Jones and Company in the Supreme Court of Victoria for defamation regarding an article published about him in Barron's Online in the year 2000. It was one of the first international legal cases involving defamation on the internet. The case was highly controversial and the subject of much commentary from legal analysts. The case was appealed by the author, William Alpert, to the UN under the right of direct petition for individuals. With the prospect of that appeal, prepared by Geoffrey Robertson QC, Tim Robertson SC, London-based Human Rights lawyer Mark Stephens and Sydney-based lawyer Paul Reidy, the case was settled on 15 November 2004. Dow Jones settled the case, agreeing to pay Gutnick some of his legal fees.

=== Bankruptcy ===
On 8 July 2016 Gutnick declared himself bankrupt with debts of over $275 million.

== Sports administration career ==
=== Melbourne Football Club President ===
Gutnick held the position of President of the Melbourne Football Club, which is a professional Australian rules football club that competes in the Australian Football League (AFL), Gutnick served in the role from 1996 until 2001. Gutnick held the role of president of the club until 18 December 2001, when he was ousted in a majority vote by the board of the club in the board election with 65 percent majority of the votes for Gabriel Szondy's “Team Vision” ticket in support for Gutnick to be ousted against 35 per cent with Gutnick's “Melbourne First” ticket in support for Gutnick to remain in the role as president. Gutnick was then replaced by Gabriel Szondy.

== Personal life ==
Gutnick lives in Melbourne with his wife, a daughter of textile maker Max New, whom he married in 1974; they have 11 children. He studied for rabbinic ordination in Brooklyn, New York, and ran a religious girls' seminary in Melbourne. Gutnick is an Orthodox Jew, and a member of the Chabad-Lubavitch Hasidic movement. According to Gutnick, in 1988, Rabbi Menachem Mendel Schneerson, known as the Rebbe, told him to mine for gold in Australia's desert. His brothers Mordechai Gutnick and Moshe Gutnick are prominent Orthodox rabbis in Australia.

== Philanthropy ==
Gutnick has made significant donations to schools and Jewish organisations in Australia and worldwide. He organized and funded the creation of Ohel Chabad Lubavitch. He also established the Gutnick Center, a gift shop, restaurant, and small museum for visitors and Israeli soldiers on the Jewish side of the Cave of the Patriarchs in Hebron.

Sporting positions
Preceded by Ian Ridley	President of the Melbourne Football Club; 1996–2001	Succeeded by Gabriel Szondy
