= Great Central Mines =

Former Australian gold mining company

- Type: Public, ASX: GCM
- Industry: Resources
- Predecessor: Great Central Mines NL
- Defunct: 1999
- Headquarters: Melbourne, Australia
- Key people: Joseph Gutnick (chairman of the board)
- Products: Gold
- Production output: Gold: 783,182 ounces (1998–99)

Great Central Mines was an Australian gold mining company.

The company lost its independence in 1999, when it was taken over by Normandy Mining, and was renamed Normandy Yandal Operations Limited in 2000. The company's takeover however led to lengthy court proceedings, initiated by the Australian Securities and Investments Commission, which only finalised in February 2003. At this stage, Normandy Mining itself had been taken over by the Newmont Mining Corporation.

== History ==
=== Names and listings ===
The company started its existence under the name of Great Central Mines NL, changing its name to Great Central Mines Limited on 19 December 1996. The company was listed on the Australian Securities Exchange under the code GCM.

=== Great Central Mines ===
Great Central Mines was led by the ordained Rabbi Joseph Gutnick, who was, after almost having been ruined by the 1987 stock market crash, advised by the Rebbe Menachem Schneerson to go back to the Australian desert and search for "gold and diamonds".

In 1988, Gutnick's company discovered the deposit which was to become the Plutonic Gold Mine in Western Australia, which he sold for A$50 million.

GCM acquired the majority of the Bronzewing deposit from Mark Creasy, a sale which earned the later an entry into the Guinness Book of Records, becoming the prospector receiving the richest payout, having received A$115 million for it from GCM. The company purchased the remaining 30% of Bronzewing it didn't own in early 1995 for US$89 million, together with the remaining 49% stake of the Jundee Gold Mine it hadn't owned previously.

By 1996, GCM was worth A$500 million, but Gutnick's web of companies was built on debt.

On 21 August 1997, GCM made an offer for Wiluna Mines Limited, owner of the Wiluna Gold Mine. This offer closed on 10 October 1997 and was followed by a second offer, lasting until 2 January 1998. GCM acquired the necessary 90% acceptance in the second offer and moved to compulsory acquisition on 5 January 1998.

=== Normandy takeover ===
In early 1999, Normandy Mining made an offer for GCM through Yandal Gold, a company it owned a 49.9% interest in. This offer came under investigation from the Australian Securities and Investments Commission, which demanded a termination of the offer on 23 March 1999. Gutnick and Normandy chairman Robert Champion de Crespigny were found to have illegally structured a takeover of the company and Gutnick was ordered to return $28.5 million to investors. The court found that their behaviour in jointly bidding $450 million earlier that year for Great Central Mines was unlawful and deceptive. Both Gutnick and Crespigny had shareholdings in GCM before this bid was launched, and they agreed together to form the Yandal Gold company. The court found however, that it was only Gutnick who received any benefit and it was therefore him who had to pay the $28.5 million. Justice Ron Merkel of the Federal Court found that Yandal Gold, jointly owned by Gutnick's family company Edensor Nominees, and Normandy, acted illegally during the takeover. Court proceedings finalised only in February 2003, after Normandy Mining itself had ceased to exist.

The deal nevertheless went ahead and brought the Bronzewing, Jundee and Wiluna Gold Mine's to Normandy. The ongoing court proceedings however meant, that GCM could not be delisted from the ASX, as planned, on 22 June 1999. Instead, GCM continued to trade, acquiring the Mt McClure Gold Mine, near Bronzewing, in September 1999 and integrating it in the later.

On 5 April 2000, Joseph Gutnick, Robert Champion de Crespigny and Ian Gould resigned as directors of the company, to be replaced by three new directors.

=== Post-takeover ===
GCM became Normandy Yandal Operations Limited on 30 June 2000, changing its Australian Securities Exchange code to NYY. Normandy Yandal, in turn, was renamed Newmont Yandal Operations Limited, after the takeover of Normandy by Newmont, on 24 May 2002. At the end of court proceedings, on 28 February 2003, Newmont Yandal was delisted from the Australian Securities Exchange. The final court decision modified the original court order such that former GCM shareholders were not able to reacquire their shares in GCM, making the existence of the company for legal reasons unnecessary.

== Operations ==
Gold mines in the Mid West region

GCM operated three gold mines, all in Western Australia, during its existence:

- Bronzewing Gold Mine: Developed by GCM in the early 1990s, Bronzwing produced approximately 250,000 to 300,000 ounces of gold annually.
- Jundee-Nimary Gold Mine: Developed by GCM in the mid-1990s, Jundee and Nimery produced approximately 300,000 ounces of gold annually, with two-thirds of it produced from Jundee and one third from nearby Nimary.
- Wiluna Gold Mine: Acquired in late 1997, the Wiluna mine produced approximately 130,000 ounces of gold annually under GCM.

== Production ==
Annual production figures of the company:

Year	Production	Cost per ounce
1996–97	436,209 ounces	A$277
1997–98	649,322 ounces	A$301
1998–99	783,182 ounces	A$307
