= List of State Register of Heritage Places in the Shire of Wiluna =

The State Register of Heritage Places is maintained by the Heritage Council of Western Australia. As of 2026, 38 places are heritage-listed in the Shire of Wiluna, of which two are on the State Register of Heritage Places.

== List ==
The Western Australian State Register of Heritage Places, as of 2026, lists the following two state-registered places within the Shire of Wiluna:

Place name	Place #	Location	Suburb or town	Co-ordinates	Built	State registered	Notes	Photo
Mine Manager's House	5507	Situated 2 km South-East of Wiluna	Wiluna	26°37′12″S 120°14′10″E	1929	27 December 2002	Also referred to as "The Lodge"; Part of the Wiluna Gold Mine; An inter-war bungalow, making use of many of the aesthetic devices of the Federation Bungalow style	
Wiluna District Hospital Group (former)	3635	Scotia Street	Wiluna	26°35′50″S 120°13′42″E	1900	8 January 2010	Also referred to as Lake Way Hospital, Wiluna Shire Offices and Tjukurba Art Gallery; The complex consists of the Morgue, the Main Hospital Buildings, Hospital Quarters and the Tjukurba Art Gallery (former the Maternity Ward); Closely associated with the reestablishment of large scale mining at Wiluna in the 1930s	
