= Bronzewing Gold Mine =

Gold mine in Western Australia

Bronzewing
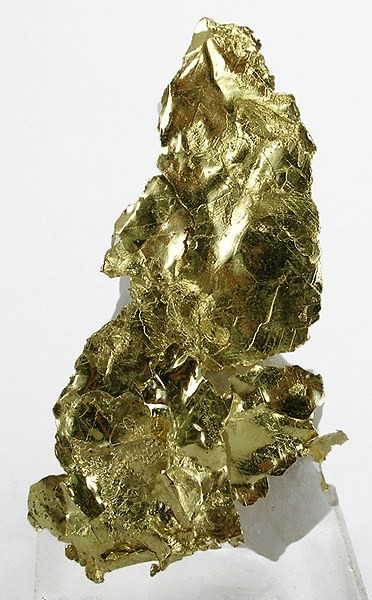
- Gold on calcite, Bronzewing Mine

- Location in Western Australia
- Interactive map of Bronzewing
- Location: Leinster, Western Australia, Australia; 27°23′05″S 121°00′31″E
- Products: Gold
- Production: 0^{[1]}
- Financial year: 2020–21
- Opened: 1991
- Active: 1991–2004 2008–2009 2010–2013
- Company: Northern Star Resources
- Website: www.nsrltd.com
- Acquired: 2019

The Bronzewing Gold Mine is a gold mine located approximately 83 km north-east of Leinster, Western Australia. The mine, owned by Navigator Resources Limited, has been in care and maintenance since March 2013, after its owner went into administration.

The mine is located within the Yandal Greenstone Belt, and is owned by Northern Star Resources.

== History ==
Gold mines in the Mid West region

The Bronzewing deposit was discovered by Mark Creasy, and its sale earned him an entry into the Guinness Book of Records as the prospector receiving the richest payout, A$115 million from Great Central Mines.

The Bronzewing Gold Mine opened in 1991, then under the ownership of Great Central Mines, a company led by the ordained Rabbi Joseph Gutnick. Great Central Mines purchased the remaining 30% of the mine it did not own in early 1995. On 20 May 1999, Bronzewing produced its 1,000,000th ounce of gold.

GMC was taken over by Normandy Mining, with Bronzewing, the Jundee Gold Mine and the Wiluna Gold Mine, in 1999 but continued trading until mid-2000. GMC acquired the Mt McClure Gold Mine, near Bronzewing, in September 1999 and integrating it into the latter. Normandy, in turn, was taken over by the Newmont Mining Corporation in February 2002.

From 1991 to 2004, the mine produced over 3.0 million ounces of gold from eleven open cut and three underground operations, with the last of the later having closed shortly before the sale of the mine to View Resources.

View Resources purchased the mine in July 2004 from Newmont for A$9.0 million, a package that also included the McClure mining operation, 8 km west of Bronzewing. The company initially placed the mine in care and maintenance and hoped to resume production in mid-2005.

It later deferred the start of production, making the final payment to Newmont in regards to the Bronzewing purchase in July 2005. In October 2006, View announced it would redevelop the plant at Bronzewing and target a mid-2007 start date for production.

The company resumed mining at Bronzewing from underground and open pit sources in April 2007. On 17 May 2007, it announced its first gold pour at Bronzewing. It forecast a mine life of 4.5 years at an annual production rate of 120,000 ounces of gold, hoping to extend these figures. Mining was carried out in two open pit locations, the Success and the Central Pit, and two underground declines, Discovery and Calista.

On 6 February 2008, the directors of the company announced a production short fall, with only 6,500 ounces produced instead of the expected 10,000 for January. This was blamed on a grade short fall. As an immediate action, View suspended underground mining.

View Resources Limited went into administration on 8 February 2008, ending all mining activities on site.

Navigator Resources announced on 2 April 2009 that it intended to purchase the Bronzewing mine for A$9.55 million plus a $6.45 million environmental bond. Navigator planned to resume mining from open pit sources in January 2010. The acquisition of Bronzewing was completed on 1 October 2009 and Navigator set the date for first gold production to April 2010. Shortly after, on 7 October, the administrators of View Resources Gold, Ferrier Hodgson, announced that the company will eventually go into liquidation.

Navigator carried out its first gold pour at the mine on 21 April 2010. The mine produced 11,409 ounces of gold for the financial year 2009-10, all from the final quarter of the year, with a production forecast of 101,000 ounces for the following year. Ore shortfalls caused the mine to underperform in its first full year of operation, with only 75,000 ounces processed. Navigator was forced to cut back its production projection for 2011-12 to 75,000 to 80,000 ounces and to raise additional cash through a A$32.6 million renouncable rights issue.

On 28 March 2013 Navigator Resources, owner of the miner, went into administration, with an estimated debt of A$30 million. The reason for the failure of the Bronzewing project was seen in the low grades the mine produced and the high labour costs in Australia. Approximately 200 staff at the mine were laid off and mining operations were halted by the appointed administrator, Pitcher Partners.

On 7 January 2014 it was announced that the mine had been sold to Metaliko Resources for A$4.82 million. The sale was scheduled to be completed by 28 February 2014. Metaliko Resources was taken over by Echo Resources in January 2017.

Echo Resources announced in early 2019 that it would refurbish the Bronzewing processing plant with the aim of extracting 379,000 ounces of gold from the mine over a four year period.

In December 2019, Northern Star Resources completed the takeover of previous owner Echo Resources and added the Bronzewing mine and combined it with its Jundee Gold Mine as part of the new Yandal Production Centre.

== Fatalities ==
The mine suffered one of the worst disasters in recent Western Australian mining history when three employees were killed in the underground operations. Troy Terrence Woodard (26), Timothy Lee Bell (21) and Shane Hamill (45) were trapped 450 metres underground when 18,000 cubic metres of sand-slurry, sludge, mud and rock broke through a storage area on 26 June 2000.

In May 1998, Francis Thomas Grubb (34) was fatally crushed against a wall by the bucket of an 11-metre loader.

== Production ==
Annual production of the mine: On 20 May 1999, Bronzewing produced its 1,000,000th ounce of gold:

Year	Production	Grade	Cost per ounce
1997–98	272,524 ounces	5.00 g/t	A$256
1998–99	291,415 ounces	5.30 g/t	US$204
2000	197,681 ounces	4.04 g/t	A$387
2001	311,506 ounces	5.1 g/t	A$294
2002^{[2]}	197,846 ounces	4.38 g/t	A$403
2003			
2004			
2004–07	In care and maintenance		
2006–07	1,731 ounces		
July – September 2007	17,600 ounces		
October – December 2007	25,406 ounces	1.86 g/t	
2009–10	11,409 ounces	1.17 g/t	
2010–11	75,423 ounces	1.18 g/t	A$1,135
2011–12	50,966 ounces	1.19 g/t	A$1,540
July – December 2012	48,792 ounces	1.32 g/t	A$1,297
2013–19	In care and maintenance		

=== Yandal Production Centre ===
Production figures for the combined Yandal Production Centre, which consist of Bronzewing and Jundee Gold Mine. The Thunderbox Gold Mine was also added to the Yandal operations in 2021 period but production figures were reported separately for 2020–21. The Bronzewing mine remained in care and maintenance:

Year	Production	Grade	Cost per ounce
2019–21	In care and maintenance		

== Notes ==
- ^[1]Production figure is for the combined Yandal Production Centre, which consists of the Bronzewing and Jundee Gold Mine. The Bronzewing mine remained in care and maintenance during the 2019 to 2021 period. The Thunderbox Gold Mine was also added to the Yandal operations during that time period but production figures were reported separately.
- ^[2]Figures for January to September 2002.
