= Regis Resources =

Gold mining company in Australia

- Traded as: ASX: RRL
- Industry: Gold mines
- Founded: 12 May 1986
- Headquarters: Subiaco, Western Australia, Australia
- Key people: James Mactier (chairman); Jim Beyer (CEO)
- Products: Gold
- Production output: 458,351 ounces (2022–23)
- Revenue: ▲ A$1,134,000,000 (2022–23); A$1,016,000,000 (2021–22)
- Website: regisresources.com.au

Regis Resources is an Australian-based, Australian Securities Exchange-listed (ASX) gold producer and explorer based in Subiaco, Western Australia.

The company's main assets are the fully owned Duketon Gold Project and a 30 percent share in the Tropicana Gold Mine, both located in Western Australia.

From 1987 to 2004, Australian businessman and mining industry entrepreneur Joseph Gutnick served as a director of the company, at times also filling the role of chairman and managing director.

== History ==
Gold mines in the Mid West region, with the Duketon Gold Project operations shown on the far right of the map

The company was established on 12 May 1986 as Johnson’s Well Mining NL and listed on the Australian Securities Exchange on 19 February 1987. Australian businessman and mining industry entrepreneur Joseph Gutnick served as a director of the company from 1987, later taking on the role of managing director and chairman, which he held until August 2004, when he resigned from all board positions. As part of this leadership change, Gutnick also relinquished some of the company's debt as well as reducing his stake in the company from 65 percent to below 20 percent.

The company initially focused on gold exploration in the Yalgoo area of Western Australia before shifting its attention to the area around Duketon after an acquisition of tenements there in 1994. The Duketon area, also historically mined, was considered underexplored.

On 31 August 2004, Johnson’s Well Mining NL was renamed to Regis Resources NL, with the latter eventually changing to Regis Resources Limited on 23 January 2008.

In mid-2005, in order to further the Moolart Well development, Newmont took up a 47 percent interest in Regis, replacing Joseph Gutnick as the main shareholder in the company, whose share went from 42 to 20 percent. Newmont eventually sold the final 20 percent of this stake in March 2016.

In 2010, construction commenced on the Moolart Well Gold Mine, the first mine of the Duketon Gold Project. It was completed in 2011, followed by the Garden Well Gold Mine in 2012 and the Rosemont Gold Mine in 2013.

In May 2021, Regis Resources acquired a 30 percent stake in the Tropicana Gold Mine from IGO Limited for A$903 million, with the remaining 70 percent held by AngloGold Ashanti.

== Production ==
Annual production of the company since commencement in 2010–11:

Year	Gold production
2010–11	81,000 ounces ▲
2011–12	105,000 ounces ▲
2012–13	269,000 ounces ▲
2013–14	272,000 ounces ▲
2014–15	310,000 ounces ▲
2015–16	305,000 ounces ▼
2016–17	324,000 ounces ▲
2017–18	361,000 ounces ▲
2018–19	363,000 ounces ▲
2019–20	352,000 ounces ▼
2020–21	373,000 ounces ▲
2021–22	437,000 ounces ▲
2022–23	458,351 ounces ▲
2023–24	417,7131 ounces ▼
