= Decrespignyite-(Y) =

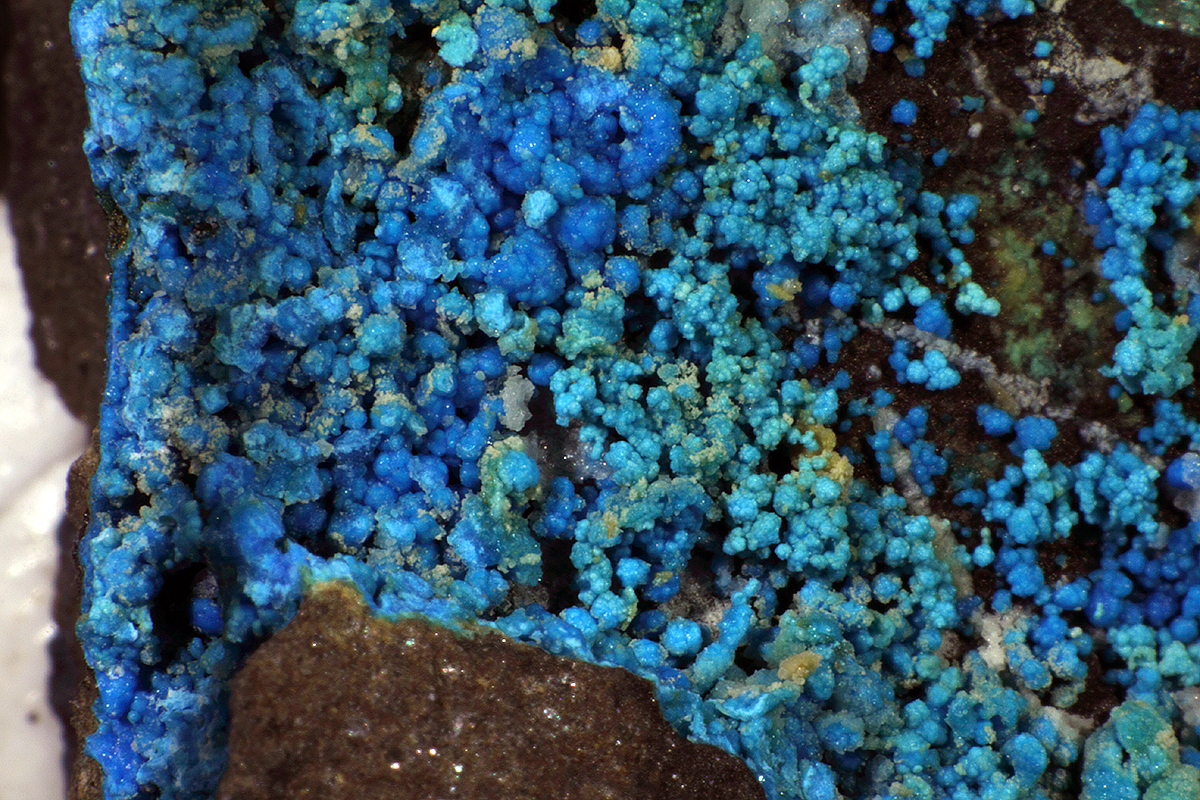
- Near perfect formation of (blue) Decrespignyite-(Y) crystals creating botryoidal type formations with a small amount of (grey) Kamphaugite-(Y)

General
- Category: Carbonate minerals
- Formula: Cu(Y, REE)_{4}(CO_{3})_{4}(OH)_{5}Cl · 2H_{2}O
- IMA symbol: Dcp-Y
- Strunz classification: 5.CC.35
- Dana classification: 16a.1.11.1
- Crystal system: Monoclinic; Unknown space group

Identification
- Color: bright royal blue to pale blue
- Fracture: none observed
- Mohs scale hardness: 4
- Luster: vitreous, pearly
- Streak: pale blue
- Density: 3.64 g/cm3 (measured) 3.645 g/cm3 (calculated)

Decrespignyite-(Y) is a copper yttrium rare earth carbonate chloride hydrate;

With a simple formula of; Cu(Y, REE)_{4}(CO_{3})_{4}(OH)_{5}Cl · 2H_{2}O

Usually found as single pseudohexagonal platelets, often curved, and regularly measuring 10-50μm in size. It appears as royal blue to turquoise blue in colour, with a pale blue streak, and a pearly to vitreous lustre. Regarded as a supergene mineral which is believed to be formed through by mildly carbonated ground waters precipitating through the ore body. It is often associated with malachite, kamphaugite-(Y), donnayite-(Y) and caysichite-(Y). It is to be further noted that all 'donnayite-(Y)' associated with decrespignyite-(Y) at the Paratoo Copper Mine is very likely to be erroneously named at the locality and is probably alicewilsonite-(YLa).

== Discovery ==
First discovered at the Paratoo copper mine, near Yunta, Olary district, South Australia; Decrespignyite-(Y) was first brought to the attention of Dr. Allan Pring (Principal Research Scientist and Head, Mineral Sciences, South Australian Museum 1984-2015) in 1998, by Mr. John Toma, a prominent South Australian mineral collector and amateur mineralogist. Mr. Toma had noted unusual properties of an unknown mineral specimen, requesting Dr. Pring and the SA museum Mineral Sciences team test the unknown sample.

== Research and Publication ==
Dr. Pring joined with Dr. U. Kolitsch (Curator of minerals and deposit collection, Mineralogical-petrographic Abt. Natural History Museum, Austria), K. Wallwork (School of Chemistry, Physics and Earth Sciences, The Flinders University of South Australia), and L. Nasdala (Institute of Geosciences and Mineralogy, Johannes Gutenberg University, Germany), to perform the required tests and analyses in order to determine the nature, and properties of this (then) new mineral. Using a combination of X-ray diffraction, with analysis using a 100 mm diameter Guinier-Ha gg camera (using Cr-Kα_{1} radiation (l=2.28970 A°) and Si as an internal standard), vibrational spectroscopy gaining Raman spectra obtained by use of a Renishaw RM 1000 system, (equipped with Leica DMLM series optical microscope), and chemical analysis via electron microprobe using a Cameca CAMEBAX SX51 electron microscope, and observations of physical properties; the team eventually determined no other known mineral matched the specimens collected.

=== Naming ===
Results of the analyses were presented to IMA Commission on New Minerals and Mineral Names (2001-027) during 2001. The presentation requested the naming of the new mineral to be made in honour of Australian Robert Champion de Crespigny (b.1950), for recognition of his contributions to the Australian education and the Australian mining industry. At the time he held positions of executive chairman of Normandy Mining, Chancellor of the University of Adelaide, and was the Chairman of the South Australian Museum. The IMA approved the naming, and the status of the mineral Decrespignyite-(Y) (2001-027) during 2001, with the description paper by Wallwork et al. being published later in 2002.
