= Thunderbox =

Thunderbox may refer to:

- Thunderbox, a slang word for a portable toilet
- Thunderbox (album), by the group Humble Pie
- Thunderbox Gold Mine, a disused gold mine in Leinster, Western Australia
- Thunderbox Heavyweight Tournament, a former boxing tournament in Atlantic City, New Jersey
- Donnerbüchse, rolling stock formerly used on German railways
