= Jundee Gold Mine =

Gold mine in Western Australia

Jundee
- Location in Western Australia
- Interactive map of Jundee
- Location: Wiluna, Western Australia, Australia; 26°21′28″S 120°37′06″E
- Products: Gold
- Production: 320,201 ounces
- Financial year: 2022–23
- Opened: 1995
- Company: Northern Star Resources
- Website: www.nsrltd.com
- Acquired: 2014

The Jundee Gold Mine is an active gold mine in Western Australia, approximately 47 km north east of the town of Wiluna, owned by Northern Star Resources.

== History ==
Gold mines in the Mid West region

The Jundee mine was opened in 1995, originally as an open pit operation and, from 1997, also as an underground mine.

Originally, the mine was owned to 51% by Great Central Mines, which acquired the remaining 49% in early 1995 for US$89 million, alongside 30% of the Bronzewing Gold Mine.

In 1997, the Jundee mine was enlarged with the acquisition of the nearby Nimary Gold Mine, owned by the Eagle Mining Corporation NL.

Great Central Mines, with Jundee, Bronzewing and the Wiluna Gold Mine, was taken over by Normandy Mining in June 2000 and Normandy, in turn, by the Newmont Mining Corporation in February 2002. Newmont sold the operations to Northern Star Resources in 2014.

The mine was operating as an open pit and underground mine until 2007, when the last open pit closed. Newmont planned to return to open pit mining in 2010 if drilling results were positive. Open pit mining commenced again under the subsequent owner, Northern Star Resources, during the 2019–20 financial year.

In June 2014, Northern Star Resources completed the purchase of the mine from Newmont at a cost of $US82.5 million. Earlier in the year, Northern Star had already purchased the Plutonic, Kanowna Belle and Kundana Gold Mines from Barrick Gold for US$100 million, making the company Australia's second-largest gold producer, behind Newmont, at the time.

As of 2024, the mine expands its electricity system with 24 MW wind power, 16.9 MWp solar power and a 12 MW / 13.4 MWh battery, supplying half of the mine's power needs.

== Production ==
=== Jundee ===
Annual production of the mine:

Year	Production	Grade	Cost per ounce
1997-98	293,016 ounces	3.32 g/t	A$327
1998-99	385,088 ounces	4.26 g/t	US$186
2000	359,186 ounces	4.31 g/t	A$350
2001	403,689 ounces	6.08 g/t	A$262
2002 ^{[2]}	167,157 ounces	5.16 g/t	A$320
2003			
2004			
2005	341,800 ounces		
2006	305,400 ounces		
2007	291,900 ounces	4.93 g/t	
2008	376,900 ounces	6.83 g/t	
2009	412,300 ounces		
2010			
2011			
2012			
2013			
2014			

=== Yandal Production Centre ===
Production figures for the mine under the ownership of Northern Star Resources. From 2020, Northern Star reported combined figures for the Yandal Production Centre, which consist of Jundee and the Bronzewing Gold Mine. The Thunderbox Gold Mine was also added to the Yandal operations in 2021 period but production figures were reported separately for 2020–21. The Bronzewing mine, acquired in 2019, remained in care and maintenance:

Year	Production	Grade	Cost per ounce
2014–15			
2015–16	209,515 ounces	5.5 g/t	A$1,007
2016–17	233,556 ounces	5.2 g/t	A$948
2017–18	283,288 ounces	5.4 g/t	A$870
2018–19	295,053 ounces		A$981
2019–20	294,279 ounces		A$1,095
2020–21	286,676 ounces		A$1,278
2021–22	310,225 ounces	3.9 g/t	A$1,295
2022–23	320,201 ounces	3.6 g/t	A$1,365

== Notes ==
- ^[1]Production figure is for the combined Yandal Production Centre, which consists of the Jundee and Bronzewing Gold Mine. The Bronzewing mine remained in care and maintenance during the 2019 to 2021 period. The Thunderbox Gold Mine was also added to the Yandal operations during that time period but production figures were reported separately.
- ^[2]Figures for January to September 2002.
