= Carbonate chloride =

Class of chemical compounds

The carbonate chlorides are double salts containing both carbonate and chloride anions. Quite a few minerals are known. Several artificial compounds have been made. Some complexes have both carbonate and chloride ligands. They are part of the family of halocarbonates. In turn these halocarbonates are a part of mixed anion materials.

The carbonate chlorides do not have a bond from chlorine to carbon, however "chlorocarbonate" has also been used to refer to the chloroformates which contain the group ClC(O)O-.

== Formation ==
=== Natural ===
Scapolite is produced in nature by metasomatism, where hot high pressure water solutions of carbon dioxide and sodium chloride modify plagioclase.

Chloroartinite is found in Sorel cements exposed to air.

== Minerals ==
In 2016 27 chloride containing carbonate minerals were known.

name	formula	crystal system	space group	unit cell	density	Optics refractive index	Raman spectrum	comments	reference
Alexkhomyakovite	K_{6}(Ca_{2}Na)(CO_{3})_{5}Cl∙6H_{2}O	hexagonal	P6_{3}/mcm	a=9.2691, c=15.8419, V=1178.72 Z = 2	2.25	uniaxial (–), ω=1.543, ε=1.476			
Ashburtonite	HPb_{4}Cu_{4}(Si_{4}O_{12})(HCO_{3})_{4}(OH)_{4}Cl								
Balliranoite	(Na,K)_{6}Ca_{2}(Si_{6}Al_{6}O_{24})Cl_{2}(CO_{3})	hexagonal	P6_{3}	a=12.695 c=5.325 V=743.2 Z=1	2.48	uniaxial (+), ω=1.523, ε=1.525			
Barstowite	Pb_{4}(CO_{3})Cl_{6}.H_{2}O								
Chlorartinite	Mg_{2}(CO_{3})Cl(OH).3H_{2}O								
Chlormagaluminite	(Mg,Fe^{2+})_{4}Al_{2}(OH)_{12}(Cl, 0.5 CO_{3})_{2}·2H_{2}O		6/mmm		1.98-2.09	ε=1.560 ω=1.540			
Davyne								can substitute CO3 for SO4	
Decrespignyite-(Y)	Y_{4}Cu(CO_{3})_{4}Cl(OH)_{5}·2H_{2}O						V4 bending 694, 718 and 746; V2 bending 791, 815, 837 and 849;v3 antisymmetric stretching 1391, 1414, 1489, 1547; also OH stretching	light blue	
Defernite	Ca_{3}CO_{3}(OH,Cl)_{4}.H_{2}O								
Hanksite	Na_{22}K(SO_{4})_{9}(CO_{3})_{2}Cl	hexagonal	P6_{3}/m	a = 10.46 Å c = 21.19 Å; Z = 2					
iowaite	Mg_{6}Fe_{2}(Cl,(CO_{3})_{0.5})(OH)_{16}·4H_{2}O								
Kampfite	Ba_{12}(Si_{11}Al_{5})O_{31}(CO_{3})_{8}Cl_{5}	monoclinic	Cc	a = 31.2329, b=5.2398, c=9.0966 β = 106.933°		uniaxial (–), n_{ω} = 1.642 n_{ε} = 1.594			
Marialite	Na_{4}(AlSi_{3}O_{8})_{3}(Cl_{2},CO_{3},SO_{4})								
Mineevite-(Y)	Na_{25}BaY_{2}(CO_{3})_{11}(HCO_{3})_{4}(SO_{4})_{2}F_{2}Cl								
Northupite	Na_{3}Mg(CO_{3})_{2}Cl	octahedral	Fd3	Z=16		1.514	v4 bending 714; v3 antisymmetric stretching 1554		
Phosgenite	Pb_{2}CO_{3}Cl_{2}	tetragonal		a=8.15 c=8.87					
Reederite-(Y)	Na15Y2(CO3)9(SO3F)Cl								
Sakhaite (with Harkerite)	Ca_{48}Mg_{16}Al(SiO_{3}OH)_{4}(CO_{3})_{16}(BO_{3})_{28}·(H_{2}O)_{3}(HCl)_{3}or Ca_{12}Mg_{4}(BO_{3})_{7}(CO_{3})_{4}Cl(OH)_{2}·H_{2}O								
Scapolite	Ca_{3}Na_{5}[Al_{8}Si_{16}O_{48}]Cl(CO_{3})		P4_{2}/n	a=12.07899 c=7.583467 V=1106.443					
Tatarskite	Ca_{6}Mg_{2}(SO_{4})_{2}(CO_{3})_{2}(OH)_{4}Cl_{4}•7H_{2}O	orthorhombic				Biaxial (-) nα = 1.567 nβ = 1.654 nγ = 1.722			
Tunisite	NaCa_{2}Al_{4}(CO_{3})_{4}Cl(OH)_{8}	tetragonal	P4/nmm	a=11.198 c=6.5637 Z=2					
Vasilyevite	(Hg_{2})_{10}O_{6}I_{3}Br_{2}Cl(CO_{3})		P1̅	a=9.344 b=10.653 c=18.265, α=93.262 β=90.548 γ=115.422° V=1638.3 Z=2	9.57				

== Artificial ==
name	formula		crystal system	space group	unit cell in Å	density	comment	reference
	K_{5}Na_{2}Cu_{24}(CO_{3})_{16}Cl_{3}(OH)_{20}•12H_{2}O		cubic	F23	a=15.463 V=3697.5 Z=2	3.044	dark blue	
	Y_{8}O(OH)_{15}(CO_{3})_{3}Cl	1197.88	hexagonal	P6_{3}	a=9.5089 c=14.6730 Z=2 V=1148.97	3.462		
	Lu_{8}O(OH)_{15}(CO_{3})_{3}Cl	1886.32	hexagonal	P6_{3}	a=9.354 c=14.415 V=1092.3 Z=2	5.689	colourless	
	Y_{3}(OH)_{6}(CO_{3})Cl		cubic	Im3m	a=12.66 V=2032 Z=8	3.035	colourless	
	Dy_{3}(OH)_{6}(CO_{3})Cl		cubic	Im3̅	a=12.4754 V=1941.6 Z=8	4.687	colourless	
	Er_{3}(OH)_{6}(CO_{3})Cl		cubic	Im3̅m	a=12.4127 V=1912.5 Z=8	4.857	pink	
	K{Mg(H_{2}O)_{6}}_{2}[Ru_{2}(CO_{3})_{4}Cl_{2}]·4H_{2}O	889.06	monoclinic	P2_{1}/c	a=11.6399 b=11.7048 c=11.8493 β=119.060 V=1411.6 Z=2	2.092	red-brown	
	K_{2}[{Mg(H_{2}O)_{4}}2Ru_{2}(CO_{3})_{4}(H_{2}O)Cl]Cl_{2}·2H_{2}O	880.58	orthorhombic	Fmm2	a=14.392 b=15.699 c=10.741 V=2426.8 Z=4	2.391	dark brown	
trisodium cobalt dicarbonate chloride	Na_{3}Co(CO_{3})_{2}Cl		cubic	Fd3̅	a=13.9959 Z=16	2.75	spin-frustrated antiferromagnetic	
trisodium manganese dicarbonate chloride	Na_{3}Mn(CO_{3})_{2}Cl		cubic		a=14.163		brown	
di-magnesium hexahydrate trihydrogencarbonate chloride	Mg_{2}(H_{2}O)_{6}(HCO_{3})_{3}Cl			R3̅c	a=8.22215 c=39.5044 V=2312.85 Z=6	1.61	decompose 125 °C	
tripotassium tricalcium selenite tricarbonate chloride	K_{3}Ca_{3}(SeO_{3})(CO_{3})_{3}Cl	579.97	hexagonal	P6_{3}	a=10.543 c=7.060 V=706.0 Z=2	2.991		
	LiBa_{9}[Si_{10}O_{25}]Cl_{7}(CO_{3})				Z=2	3.85	layer silicate	
	Ba_{3}Cl_{4}CO_{3}		orthorhombic	Pnma	a=8.407, b=9.589, c=12.483 Z=4			

== Complexes ==
The "lanthaballs" are lanthanoid atom clusters held together by carbonate and other ligands. They can form chlorides. Examples are [La_{13}(ccnm)_{6}(CO_{3})_{14}(H_{2}O)_{6}(phen)_{18}] Cl_{3}(CO_{3})·25H_{2}O where ccnm is carbamoylcyanonitrosomethanide and phen is 1,10-phenanthroline. Praseodymium (Pr) or cerium (Ce) can substitute for lanthanum (La). Other lanthanide cluster compounds include :(H_{3}O)_{6}[Dy_{76}O_{10}(OH)_{138}(OAc)_{20}(L)_{44}(H_{2}O)_{34}]•2CO_{3}•4 Cl_{2}•L•2OAc (nicknamed Dy_{76}) and (H_{3}O)_{6}[Dy_{48}O_{6}(OH)_{84}(OAc)_{4}(L)_{15}(hmp)_{18}(H_{2}O)_{20}]•CO_{3}•14Cl•2H_{2}O (termed Dy_{48}-T) with OAc=acetate, and L=3-furancarboxylate and Hhmp=2,2-bis(hydroxymethyl)propionic acid.

Platinum can form complexes with carbonate and chloride ligands, in addition to an amino acid. Examples include the platinum compound [Pt(gluH)Cl(CO_{3})]_{2}.2H_{2}O gluH=glutamic acid, and Na[Pt(gln)Cl_{2}(CO_{3})].H_{2}O gln=glutamine. Rhodium complexes include Rh_{2}(bipy)_{2}(CO_{3})_{2}Cl (bipy=bipyridine)
