= Ron Wise =

Australian businessman and entrepreneur

Ron Wise is a Western Australian businessman and entrepreneur who rose to prominence in the 1970s and 1980s. He also has a PhD in biochemistry from the University of Western Australia, and owns a winery and the wine label Wise Wines.

Wise was a founder of the annual Diggers & Dealers event in Kalgoorlie. He also developed the first natural gas venture in Western Australia, Strata Oil and Gas.

Wise was recognised as one of the most influential Western Australian businesspeople in The West Australian's 2013 list of the 100 most influential.
