= Cerro Negro mine =

Gold mine in southern Argentina

Coordinates: 46.9444°S 70.1794°W

- Interactive map of Cerro Negro mine
- Location: Santa Cruz Province, Argentina
- Products: Gold
- Company: Newmont

The Cerro Negro mine in Santa Cruz Province, southern Argentina, is one of the largest gold mines in the world. It has estimated reserves of 5.74 million ounces of gold and 49.36 million ounces of silver. The mine was designed and built by M3 Engineering.
