= Tropicana Gold Mine =

Gold mine in Western Australia

Tropicana
- Location in Western Australia
- Interactive map of Tropicana
- Location: Great Victoria Desert, Western Australia, Australia; 29°14′26″S 124°32′19″E
- Products: Gold
- Production: 310,000 troy ounces
- Financial year: 2023
- Opened: 2013
- Company: AngloGold Ashanti (70%) Regis Resources (30%)
- Website: www.anglogoldashanti.com regisresources.com.au
- Acquired: 2001

The Tropicana Gold Mine is located 330 km northeast of Kalgoorlie, Western Australia. Since 2002, it has been jointly owned by AngloGold Ashanti (70% – manager) and Regis Resources (30%).

The Tropicana tenements cover 12,500 km^{2} of crown land. It is located at the junction of the Yilgarn craton and the Fraser Range Mobile Belt.

== History ==
The Tropicana deposit was discovered in 2005. The nearby Havana deposit was discovered in 2006. Mining commenced in July 2012 and first ore was sent to the crushing circuit in July 2013. The first gold was poured on 26 September 2013.

The area was seen as a new major Australian gold province, previously unexplored due to its remoteness, and dubbed the "Tropicana Gold Belt".

In May 2021, Regis Resources purchased Independence Group's 30 percent stake in the ownership of the mine for A$903 million.

== Project ==
A pre-feasibility study carried out by AngloGold Ashanti in 2007–08 showed the mine capital cost would be A$500 million to $540m and could produce up to 430,000 ounces of gold a year.

The projects location at the western edge of the remote Great Victoria Desert constitutes one of the biggest barriers for the project, with 220 km of road having to be built to be able to access the future mine and a 40 MW power station being required to supply it with electricity.

The project was estimated to have an initial mine life of 10 years, later extended to 15 years, with an annual production of around 330,000 to 400,000 ounces (9000–11,000 kg) of gold and an overall production of 3.6 million ounces (102,000 kg).

The decision for the mine to go ahead made in December 2010, with mining scheduled to begin in 2013. AngloGold Ashanti sold its 33% stake in the Boddington Gold Mine in early 2009 to Newmont, a move seen by analysts as the "logical thing" in order to allow the expenditure on the Tropicana development.

The open pit at the mine was designed to be up to 6 km long, 1.5 km wide and up to 400 m deep.

== Environmental impact ==
The mine site was planned to involve the clearing of 3,440ha of vegetation and likely to emit up to 330,000 tonnes of carbon dioxide a year. To reduce emissions and cost from its 54 MW diesel generators, a hybrid energy system with 24 MW of solar power and a 13 MW (4 MWh) battery operated in 2024, and 24 MW of wind power (four 6MW-units). It occasionally operates without the diesel generators, even with just the wind power at night.

== Production ==
Annual production figures for the mine were:

Year	Production	Grade	Cost per ounce (AISC*)
2013	94,000 ounces	2.40 g/t	US$1,113
2014	511,000 ounces	2.78 g/t	US$752
2015	491,000 ounces	2.48 g/t	US$671
2016	417,000 ounces	1.87 g/t	US$970
2017	459,000 ounces	`1.87 g/t	US$885
2018	336,000 ounces	1.91 g/t	US$843
2019	360,000 ounces	1.85 g/t	US$757
2020	298,000 ounces	1.5 g/t	US$1,061
2021	265,000 ounces	1.28 g/t	US$1,326
2022	306,000 ounces	1.41 g/t	US$ 1,014
2023	310,000 ounces	1.45 g/t	US$ 1,304

- AISC - All-In Sustaining Costs per ounce, comprises total cash costs, plus corporate G&A, reclamation costs, exploration and study costs, sustaining capital exploration/development and sustaining capital expenditure.
