= Super Pit gold mine =

Gold mine in Western Australia

Super Pit
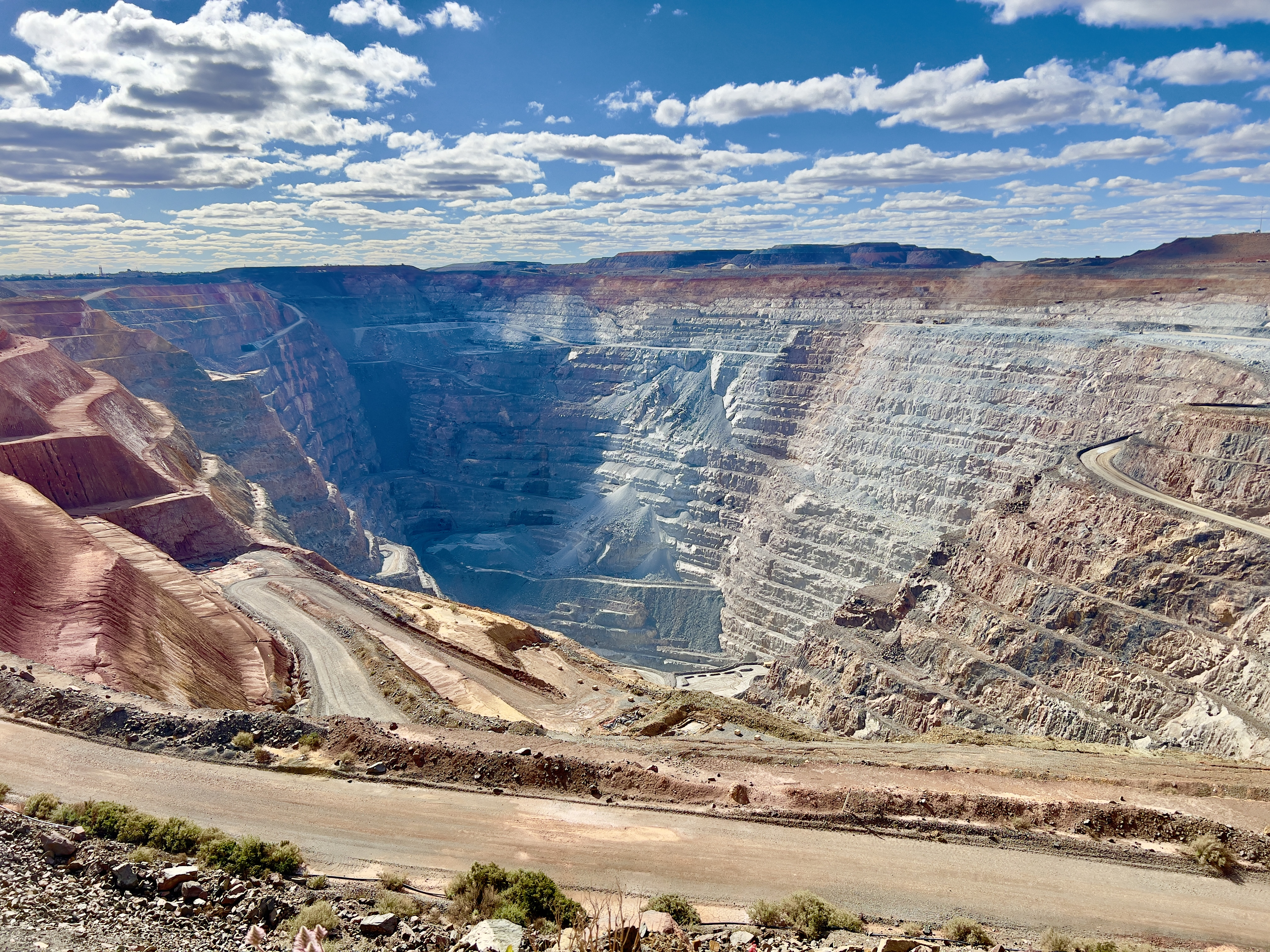
- Fimiston Open Pit gold mine, 2023

- Location in Western Australia
- Interactive map of Super Pit
- Location: Kalgoorlie, Western Australia, Australia; 30°46′29″S 121°30′34″E
- Products: Gold
- Production: 432,001 troy ounces (13.4367 t)
- Financial year: 2022–23
- Opened: 1893
- Company: Northern Star Resources
- Website: superpit.com.au
- Acquired: 2020

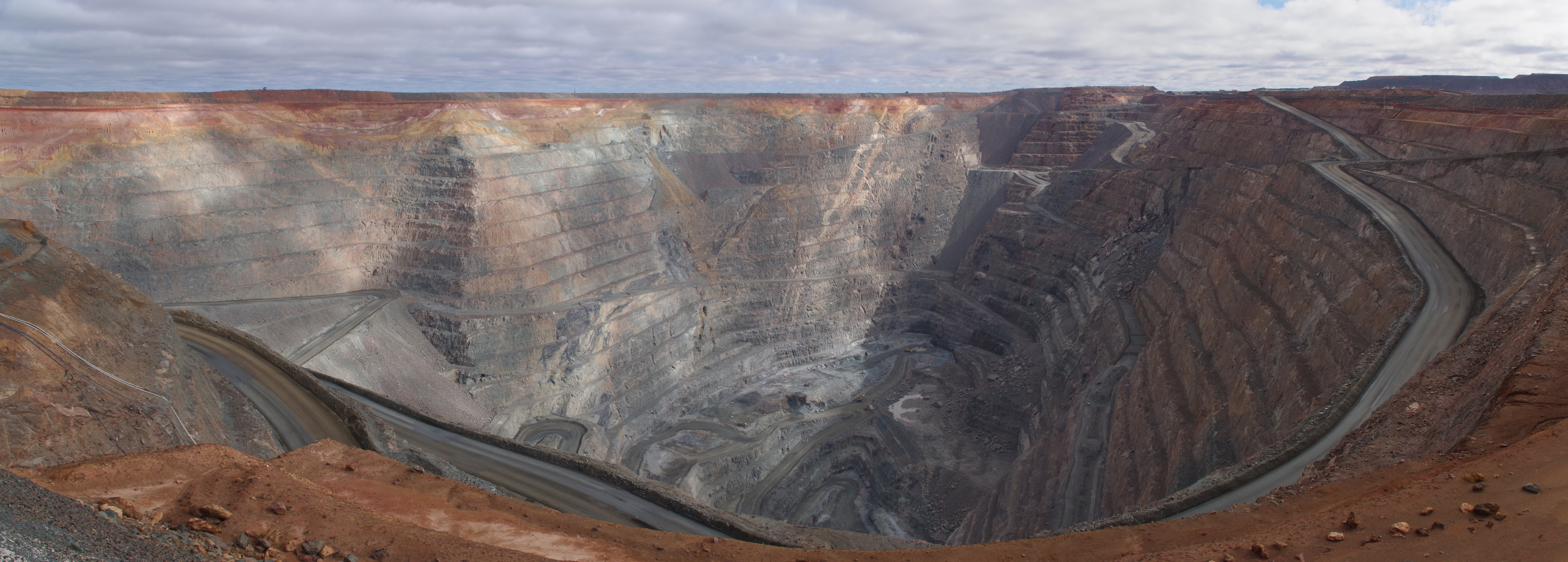
Fimiston Open Pit (Super Pit) gold mine panorama, 2019 Aug

The Fimiston Open Pit, colloquially known as the Super Pit, is an open-pit mine in Western Australia. It was Australia's largest open cut gold mine until late 2015, when it was overtaken by the Newmont Boddington gold mine, also in Western Australia. The Super Pit is located off the Goldfields Highway on the south-east edge of Kalgoorlie, Western Australia. The pit is oblong in plan view and is approximately 3.5 kilometres long, 1.6 kilometres wide and over 675 metres deep.

The Fimiston Open Pit is owned by Northern Star Resources. The mine produced 456,000 troy ounces (14.2 t) of gold in 2019, and employs around 1,100 employees and contractors directly on site.

== Earlier stages ==
The open pit area exists in what had been known as the 'Golden Mile' which consisted of a large number of historical mining leases and underground mines, including:

- Paringa
- Oroya
- Brown Hill
- Chaffers
- Hainault

Consolidation into a single open pit mine was first attempted by Alan Bond, but he was unable to complete the task.

The Fimiston Open Pit was eventually created in 1989 by Kalgoorlie Consolidated Gold Mines, a 50:50 corporate joint venture between Homestake Gold of Australia and Gold Mines of Kalgoorlie (a Normandy Mining subsidiary). Barrick Gold acquired its share of the mine in December 2001, when it took over Homestake Mining Company. Newmont became part-owner of the mine three months later, when it acquired Normandy Mining in February 2002. Saracen Mineral Holdings Limited acquired its share of the mine on 28 November 2019, when it purchased Barrick Gold's 50% stake. Northern Star Resources acquired its share of the mine on 3 January 2020, when it purchased Newmont's 50% stake.

== Geology ==
Most of the gold mined in the Fimiston Open Pit occurs within ore lodes formed by ancient shears in a rock unit called the Golden Mile Dolerite. The gold mining area of Kalgoorlie-Boulder-Fimiston has long been called the Golden Mile because of the geographical concentration of rich mines in that area, even though the lodes occur in an area over 2 km in length and 1 km in depth.

== Production ==
Mining is via conventional drill and blast mining via face shovels and dump trucks. Around 15 million tonnes of rock are moved in any given year, consisting primarily of waste rock.

Gold within the Golden Mile lode system is unusual in that it is present as telluride minerals within pyrite. In order to recover the gold, the ore must be crushed, passed through a gravity circuit to recover the free gold present in some of the higher-grade lodes, and then subjected to flotation to produce an auriferous pyrite-telluride concentrate. The concentrate is then treated at an IsaMill Ultra Fine Grinding (UFG) mill at Fimiston and then cyanidised, or trucked to the Gidji Processing Plant, 20 kilometres north of Kalgoorlie. At Gidji, the concentrate is treated in ultrafine grinding (UFG) mills, and then subjected to cyanide extraction of gold.

Prior to the installation of the UFG mills, concentrate was treated at Gidji in two circulating fluid bed roasters. Roasting ceased in 2015.

The operation requires significant amounts of power, and the mine ordered hybrid power plants in 2025 for 25 years, including a 132 kV grid, 120 MW thermal power, 256 MW wind power, 138 MW solar power, and a 138 MW / 300 MWh grid battery.

Gold mines in the Kalgoorlie region

=== Figures ===
Past production figures were:

Year	Production	Grade	Cost per ounce
1998-99	718,554 ounces	2.37 g/t	US$236
2000	715,164 ounces	2.27 g/t	A$325
2001	616,344 ounces	2.14 g/t	A$397
2002	720,050 ounces	1.73 g/t	A$222
2003			
2004			
2005	6280000オンス		
2006			
2007	628,000 ounces	1.53 g/t	
2008	612,000 ounces	1.56 g/t	
2009	690,000 ounces		US$609
2010	815,000 ounces		
2011	815,000 ounces		
2012	660,000 ounces		
2013	660,000 ounces		
2014	670,000 ounces		
2015	645,000 ounces		
2016	655,000 ounces		
2017	700,000 ounces		
2018	650,000 ounces		
2019	450,000 ounces		
2019–20			
2020–21	472,089 ounces		A$1,385
2021–22	486,001 ounces	1.4 g/t	A$1,426
2022–23	432,001 ounces	1.3 g/t	A$1,596
