= Natascha Viljoen =

South African business executive (born 1970)

Natascha Viljoen (born 1970) is a South African business executive who has served as president and chief executive officer of Newmont since January 2026. She previously served as Newmont's president and chief operating officer and as chief executive officer of Anglo American Platinum, now Valterra Platinum.

== Biography ==
=== Early life ===
Viljoen is from Klerksdorp, a small mining town in North West Province. She earned a Bachelor of Engineering from North West University, South Africa and an executive MBA from the University of Cape Town, South Africa.

=== Career ===
In February 2020, she became CEO of Anglo Platinum (Amplats).

Viljoen joined Newmont as executive vice president and chief operating officer in October 2023 and became president and chief operating officer in May 2025. On 1 January 2026, she succeeded Tom Palmer as Newmont's president and chief executive officer and joined its board of directors. She is the first woman to lead the company.
