= Normandy Mining =

Former Australian gold mining company

- Formerly: Normandy Poseidon; Normandy Resources NL; Amad NL; Northwest Tantalum NL
- Type: Public
- Traded as: ASX: NDY
- Industry: Resources
- Founded: 1954
- Founder: JG Donaldson
- Defunct: 2002
- Successor: Newmont
- Headquarters: Adelaide, Australia
- Key people: Robert Champion de Crespigny (Chairman)
- Products: Gold, Zinc
- Production output: Gold: 2,302,038 ounces (2000–01)
- Website: www.normandy.com.au

Normandy Mining was an Australian mining company which predominantly mined gold. Normandy was, during much of the late 20th century, Australia's largest gold miner.

Normandy was taken over by Newmont in February 2002.

The company produced gold mainly from its Western Australian mines, which, in 1998, provided approximately 50% of its production, followed by the Northern Territory and Queensland with approximately 15% each. International gold production contributed for less than 10% of the overall company production.

== Overview ==
=== Names and listings ===
Normandy Mining was founded by JG Donaldson in 1954 as Northwest Tantalum NL, being renamed Amad NL on 12 August 1966. Normandy Resources NL on 12 December 1985 and was listed on the Australian Securities Exchange. The company changed its name on 9 May 1991 to Normandy Poseidon Limited. The last name change occurred on 20 June 1995, to Normandy Mining Limited. The stock was delisted in 2002.

The company was also listed on the Toronto Stock Exchange and the Montreal Exchange.

=== Early history ===
On 1 July 1981, Robert Champion de Crespigny was appointed a company director, later to serve as the chairman of the company until its take over by Newmont. Crespigny transformed the exploration company Amad, valued at A$3 million, to Australia's largest gold miner, valued at A$4.9 billion by Newmont, earning an estimated A$160 million in the process.

In 1991, Normandy merged with Poseidon NL with the company renamed Normandy Poseidon Limited.

In October 1996, Normandy took over Posgold Limited.

=== Great Central Mines takeover ===
In early 1999, Normandy made an offer for Great Central Mines, a company led by Joseph Gutnick, through Yandal Gold, a company it owned a 49.9% interest in. This offer came under investigation from the Australian Securities & Investments Commission, which demanded a termination of the offer on 23 March 1999. Gutnick and Crespigny were found to have illegally structured a takeover of the company and Gutnick was ordered to return $28.5 million to investors. The court found that their behaviour in jointly bidding $450 million earlier that year for Great Central Mines (GCM) was unlawful and deceptive. Both Gutnick and Crespigny had shareholdings in GCM before this bid was launched, and they agreed together to form the Yandal Gold company. The court found however, that it was only Gutnick who received any benefit and it was therefore him who had to pay the $28.5 million.

The deal nevertheless went ahead and brought the Bronzewing, Jundee and Wiluna Gold Mine's to the company.

=== Newmont takeover ===
In late 2001, AngloGold made an offer for Normandy, valued at A$1.43 per Normandy share. It subsequently increased this offer by 30 cents per share, but was outbid by Newmont, which offered A$1.70 per share. AngloGold closed its offer on 21 January 2002, not having found sufficient acceptance to warrant an extension. AngloGold's offer was valued at A$3.2 billion, 30% above Normandy's share price at the time.

Normandy was then taken over by Delta Acquisition LLC, a subsidiary of Newmont in February 2002. The company was delisted from the ASX on 1 July 2002, and became Newmont Australia instead. Newmont had also, at the same time, taken over Franco-Nevada, making the company the world's largest gold producer. Had AngloGold succeeded in its bid, they would have become the world's largest producer instead.

== Operations ==
=== Western Australia ===
- Big Bell Gold Mine: The mine was owned by Normandy until October 1999, when New Hampton Goldfield acquired it for A$12 million in cash and A$17 million in shares.
- Boddington Gold Mine: 33.33% owned by Normandy, Boddington is now fully owned by Newmont, having bought out Newcrest's 22.22% in 2006 and the remainder from AngloGold Ashanti in early 2009.
- Bronzewing Gold Mine: Bronzewing was acquired in June 2000 when Normandy took over Great Central Mines, the mine stayed with the company until the Newmont takeover. In July 2004, View Resources purchased the mine from Newmont for A$9.0 million.
- Golden Grove Mine: Golden Grove was acquired in November 1991 from Australian Consolidated Minerals and stayed with Newmont until its sale to Oxiana Limited in June 2005 for A$265 million. Golden Grove was Normandy's only zinc mine, but also produced gold.
- Jubilee Gold Mine: Jubilee was acquired from Hampton Australia in January 1994. In April 1996, it was acquired by New Hampton Goldfields Limited.
- Jundee Gold Mine: Jundee was part of the GMC deal in 2000 and continues to be operated by Newmont.
- Super Pit gold mine: Normandy held 50% of the Kalgoorlie Consolidated Gold Mines, operator of the Super Pit gold mine, a stake Newmont has retained. The other 50% is held by Barrick Mining.
- Wiluna Gold Mine: Like Jundee and Bronzewing, Normandy acquired Wiluna in the GMC take over and brought it to Newmont. Agincourt Resources purchased the mine on 10 December 2003 from Newmont for shares and $3.65 million in cash.

== Production ==
Annual production figures of the company:

=== Gold ===
| Year | Production | Cost per ounce |
| 1997–98 | 1,737,231 ounces ^{1} | A$321 |
| 1998–99 | 1,670,674 ounces | A$329 |
| 1999–2000 | 1,972,800 ounces | A$303 |
| 2000–01 | 2,302,038 ounces | A$301 |
| 2001–02 | | |

- ^{1} Of which 1,433,900 ounces were attributable to Normandy.

=== Zinc ===
| Year | Production |
| 1997–98 | 132,800 tonnes |
