= Balliranoite =

Mineral from Italy

General
- Category: Tectosilicates
- Formula: (Na,K)_{6}Ca_{2}(Si_{6}Al_{6}O_{24})Cl_{2}(CO_{3})
- IMA symbol: Blr
- Crystal system: Hexagonal
- Crystal class: 6 - Pyramidal
- Space group: P6_{3}
- Unit cell: a = 12.696 Å, c = 5.327 Å, V = 743.6 Å^{3}, Z = 1

Identification
- Color: Colorless
- Crystal habit: Prismatic
- Cleavage: Perfect on (10-10)
- Fracture: Irregular/Uneven
- Tenacity: Brittle
- Mohs scale hardness: 5
- Luster: Vitreous
- Streak: White
- Density: 2.48 g/cm^{3}
- Optical properties: uniaxial positive

Balliranoite ((Na,K)_{6}Ca_{2}(Si_{6}Al_{6}O_{24})Cl_{2}(CO)_{3}) is a mineral that was discovered at Monte Somma – Vesuvio volcanic complex, Campania, Italy. This mineral is named in honor of Paolo Ballirano (b. 1964), Italian crystallographer and professor in the Department of Earth Sciences, University of Rome ‘‘La Sapienza’’, who has made important contributions to the crystal chemistry of cancrinite-group minerals.

== Occurrence ==
Balliranoite is found in an alkaline skarnlike rock composed of orthoclase, phlogopite, clinohumite, calcite, diopside, pargasite, haüyne, apatite and balliranoite, as product of the metasomatic interactions between alkaline magma and limestone. These chemical alterations by hydrothermal and other fluids replace elements in the chemical structure, changing the mineral composition of the rock.

== Mineral properties ==
The idealized formula for balliranoite is (Na,K)_{6}Ca_{2}(Si_{6}Al_{6}O_{24})Cl_{2}(CO_{3}), and the empirical formula based on 12 Si atoms with isomorphic substitution by Al atoms is: Na_{4.70}Ca_{2.53}K_{0.73}(Si_{6.02}Al_{5.98}O_{23.995})Cl_{2.34}(C_{O3})_{0.82}(SO4_{0.27}*0.12H_{2}O. This is a uniaxial (+) mineral with w = 1.523(2), e = 1.525(2), composed of the following compounds:

Compound	wt%	Range
Na_{2}O	13.05	12.80-13.24
K_{2}O	3.08	3.01-3.16
CaO	12.70	12.56-12.85
Al_{2}O_{3}	27.28	27.17-27.42
SiO_{2}	32.38	32.23-32.55
CO_{2}	3.24	3.18-3.30
SO_{3}	1.96	1.79-2.10
Cl	7.43	7.20-7.70
H_{2}O	0.19	0.15-0.23
-O=Cl_{2}	-1.68	-
Total	99.63	-

== X-ray crystallography ==
The powder diffraction data for balliranoite is:

d-spacing (Å)	Intensity
4.797	(100)
3.669	(57)
3.281	(73)
2.754	(16)
2.662	(58)
2.648	(13)
2.446	(31)
2.120	(18)

== See also ==
- List of minerals
