= Conquest Mining =

- Type: Public (ASX:CQT)
- Industry: Mining
- Headquarters: Australia

Conquest Mining was a mining company based in Australia. In September 2010, it bought a 40% stake in the Pajingo mine in northern Queensland. Conquest is also developing a silver-gold-copper resource at Silver Hill and is involved in a number of other goldmining projects. The executive chairman is Jake Klein.

In late 2011 Conquest Mining Ltd merged with Catalpa Resources Ltd to form a mid-tier Australian gold producer, Evolution Mining.

== Mount Carlton ==
Conquest signed a $1 billion offtake deal (for the largest deposit at Mount Carlton) with Shandong Guoda Gold, one of the largest gold smelters in China.

Total resources at Mt Carlton are now estimated to be 1.27 million ounces of gold, 40.6 million ounces of silver, and 71,800 tonnes of copper.
