= Wiluna Gold Mine =

Gold mine in Western Australia

Wiluna
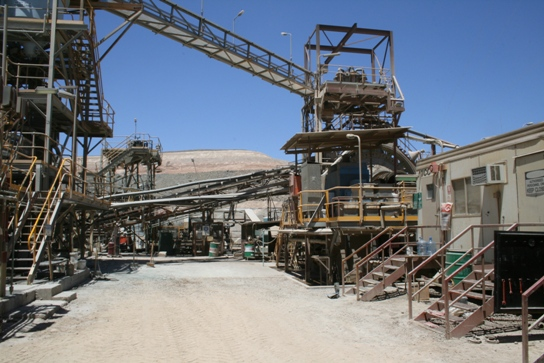
- Wiluna Mill before the 2008–09 upgrade

- Location in Western Australia
- Interactive map of Wiluna
- Location: Wiluna, Western Australia, Australia; 26°37′50″S 120°14′34″E
- Products: Gold
- Production: 1,306 kg (41,986 ozt)
- Financial year: 2021–22
- Opened: 1896
- Active: 1896–1920 1924–1947 1987–2007 2009–2013 2016–2023
- Company: Wiluna Mining Corporation
- Website: wilunamining.com.au
- Acquired: 2014

Wiluna Gold Mine is an active gold mine operated by Wiluna Mining Corporation (administrators appointed) near the town of Wiluna, 940 kilometres (580 mi) north of Perth in Western Australia's Goldfields region. Wiluna is one of the Goldfields' great mining centres, with historical production plus current resources of more than 310 tonnes (10 million troy ounces).

== Overview ==
Gold mines in the Mid West region

The mine is located within and adjacent to the native title of the Ngaanyatjarra Aboriginal people.

As of 23 August 2023, total gold resources were over 190 tonnes (6.2 million troy ounces):

- Underground: 127 tonnes (4.08 million troy ounces) at 3.66 grams per tonne (0.107 ozt/short ton)
- Open pits: 36.0 tonnes (1.156 million troy ounces) at 2.20 grams per tonne (0.064 ozt/short ton)
- Tailings re-treatment and stockpiles: 20.4 tonnes (657 thousand troy ounces) at 0.57 grams per tonne (0.017 ozt/short ton)
- Satellite deposits: 10.4 tonnes (333 thousand troy ounces) at 1.93 grams per tonne (0.056 ozt/short ton)

As of 1 November 2023, total gold reserves were over 25 tonnes (800 thousand troy ounces):

- Underground: 6.0 tonnes (192 thousand troy ounces) at 4.23 grams per tonne (0.123 ozt/short ton)
- Open pits: 6.3 tonnes (201 thousand troy ounces) at 1.96 grams per tonne (0.057 ozt/short ton)
- Tailings retreatment: 12.8 tonnes (411 thousand troy ounces) at 0.56 grams per tonne (0.016 ozt/short ton)

Following recent upgrades, the Wiluna processing plant can treat all styles of mineralisation, including refractory and non-refractory (free-milling) gold deposits. Processing infrastructure includes a 750 thousand tonnes per year (4.5 million pounds per day) sulphide flotation facility commissioned in 2021, tailings retreatment facility commissioned in 2023 (Wiltails), 2.1 million tonnes per year (13 million pounds per day) free-milling circuit, knelson gravity concentrator, and 1.1 million tonnes per year (6.6 million pounds per day) currently idle Biox facility.

Additional mining-related infrastructure includes numerous idle open pit mines, over 100 kilometres (62 mi) of underground development and five declines on care and maintenance, 1.5 million metres (4.9 million feet) of drilling data, tailings storage facilities, 300-person village, gas pipeline and power station, Goldfields Highway connection, and commercial airport services at the Wiluna airport.

Historically, the Wiluna area was extensively mined from the discovery of gold in 1896 until the end of World War II. One of the few historical buildings remaining from the earlier days of mining is the old Mine Managers Lodge, now in ruins. There is some old equipment on display at the visitors' car park, notably an old crusher and an old mill. Just before entering Wiluna from the south, a wooden building on the right-hand side of the highway is the old railway station's shed. The railway dam can still be seen but the tracks which once went all the way to Meekatharra have been removed.

== Geology ==
The Wiluna gold deposits are categorised as orogenic gold deposits, with broad similarities to many other gold deposits in Western Australia. The deposits are hosted within the Archaean Wiluna Greenstone Belt, a 2.7 billion year-old series of basalts, felsic rocks, lamprophyres, and sediments that have undergrone greenschist facies metamorphism and brittle and ductile deformation. Gold mineralisation is mainly contained within three sub-parallel dextral strike-slip shear zones, called the East, West and Adelaide-Moonlight shears, with a combined strike length exceeding 10 kilometres (6.2 mi). The shears dip nearly vertically, pinch and swell along strike and down-dip, and contain the best gold grades where they intersect favourable host rocks and rock unit boundaries. The larger high-grade shoots have been given individual names, such as the East Lode, West Lode, Moonlight, Essex, Happy Jack and Bulletin deposits. Minor high-grade, free-milling mineralisation is hosted within quartz reef deposits such as Golden Age and can be treated conventionally. However, most of the shear-hosted gold occurs within pyrite and arsenopyrite crystals, requiring a stage of oxidation such as roasting, bacterial oxidation or pressure oxidation to liberate the gold.

== History of discovery and metallurgical innovation ==
Gold was discovered at Wiluna on Saint Patrick’s Day in 1896 by prospectors George Woodley, James Wotton and Jimmy Lennon.

Three main phases of gold production followed over a period of more than 125 years, in which the mine grew to be one of the largest gold producers in Australia, and also produced significant by-product arsenic and antimony.

The mine's fortunes rose and ebbed over the decades as gold market conditions fluctuated and advances in mining and processing technologies allowed the vast gold deposits at depth to be treated economically.

In the early years, mining focussed on easily won gold from quartz reefs in the district and shallow oxidised deposits in the East and West Lodes, with gold ore treated conventionally by crushing in stamp batteries, amalgamation and cyanidation of tailings. Mining ceased about 1910 following depletion of the oxide resources, and difficulty in recovery of the refractory sulphide gold mineralisation at depth, despite trials with roasting.

In the 1920s, the resource was recognised as large and low grade (by the standards of the time) and refractory at depth, requiring a different treatment method and a high production rate. The colourful Western Australian goldfields and London personality Claude de Bernales floated the Wiluna Gold Corporation (WGC) to develop the major East and West Lodes, construct a treatment plant and other services. In the 1930s, a large mining operation was underway utilising a new metallurgical process of sulphide flotation followed by roasting of the concentrate before conventional cyanidation and gold recovery.

In the early 1980s, the advent of carbon-in-pulp (CIP) metallurgical processing and modern mining methods meant that large, low-grade oxide and "free-milling" (non-refractory) deposits could be mined economically again, leading to the re-evaluation of historical mining districts throughout the Western Australian goldfields. At Wiluna, CIP processing ushered in the economic re-treatment and environmental rehabilitation of legacy mine tailings, and the large-scale development of open pit mines on the amenable oxidised portions of the gold deposits.

In 1993, a Bacterial oxidation (Biox) processing plant was installed allowing the recovery of gold from deeper refractory sulphide ore that was mined by open pits and underground mining methods. The Biox process is a pretreatment process for refractory gold ores or concentrates, using naturally occurring bacteria to break down the sulphide ore and liberate the gold for subsequent cyanidation. Wiluna's Biox plant was only the second of its kind to be installed in Australia, following commercialisation of the technology a few years earlier in 1988. The Biox operation ran continuously from 1984 to 2007 under the ownership of some small and larger mining companies such as Wiluna Mines, Great Central Mines, Normandy Mining and Newmont, and again from 2008 to 2013 under the ownership of Apex Minerals.

From 2016 to 2022, free-milling deposits in the region were mined and processed through the CIP plant under the ownership of Blackham Resources (renamed to Wiluna Mining Corporation in 2020). In the 18 months to 31 December 2021, Wiluna Mining Corporation invested A$188 million in the redevelopment of Wiluna, with comminution and flotation facilities, knelson gravity concentrator, tailings retreatment facility, new tailings storage, camp and power upgrades, mine dewatering, 178,000 metres (584,000 ft) of drilling, 10,000 metres (33,000 ft) of underground development, and technical studies.

In December 2021, a new 750-thousand-tonne-per-year (4.5-million-pound-per-day) sulphide flotation plant was commissioned that allowed for the treatment of sulphide ore from underground and the sale of gold concentrates to offtake customers in Russia and elsewhere internationally, including Polymetal International, a world leader in refractory ore processing utilising modern Pressure oxidation (POX) techniques.

== Three phases of history ==
=== First phase: 1896 to 1910 ===
In 1896, gold was discovered in the region, which was then known as Lake Way, by three prospectors, George Woodley, James Wotton and Jimmy Lennon.

On 29 December 1897, a 14-kilogram (460-troy-ounce) nugget was found in Wiluna, then the largest found in the colony of Western Australia.

The town prospered from the development of the mine until the First World War. Around 1910, however, the mine declined because the refractory ore at greater depths could not be treated. As a consequence, the town's population shrank to less than 150 people.

=== Second phase: 1924 to 1949 ===
In 1924, Claude de Bernales floated the Wiluna Gold Corporation to undertake a drilling program and revive the Wiluna mine. De Bernales went to London in 1926 and raised £1 million to work the Wiluna mines. A later issue of promissory notes for £300,000 was backed by the Western Australian State Government. The state government also built a railway line from Meekatharra for transport of supplies including fuel oil for power generation. When the mine reopened in 1931 it attracted a substantial workforce and stimulated community growth and within four years produced gold worth £3 million. By 1939, the town had grown to a population of 9,000 thanks to the employment the mine provided.

WGC employed an innovative metallurgical processing route where refractory gold ore was treated using sulphide flotation followed by roasting of the concentrate, conventional cyanidation and gold recovery.

Gold recovery at the flotation stage was initially around 80% as salty mine water was initially used in the grinding and flotation sections. A change to fresh water in 1936 increased the gold recovery in the flotation stage to 85-89%. Flotation concentrate was then dewatered in thickeners and filters, and passed into Edwards roasters and the calcine pulped with fresh water, lime and cyanide solution before grinding in a tube mill. Thickening and filtration then led to a Merrill-Crowe precipitation plant using zinc dust for precipitation of the gold. The cyanide residues were stored in shallow dams and allowed two years to weather before being leached and the gold solution being reintroduced into the main circuit.

An arsenic tri-oxide plant was also installed capturing arsenic fumes from the roasters, and was the largest producer of arsenic in the southern hemisphere.

Gold ore at the Moonlight deposit contained the antimony ore mineral, stibnite, which was notoriously difficult to roast and cyanide, and a pilot plant was built to investigate the smelting of Moonlight concentrates by sintering, blast furnace smelting with lead and lead concentrates, and refining to obtain the gold. Crushed Moonlight mine ore was railed a short distance to the Wiluna treatment plant and processed in the parallel grinding and flotation circuit producing a sulphide concentrate for further processing, and a separate antimony concentrate for sale. A Dwight-Lloyd sintering machine, blast furnace and refinery were installed and commenced operation in October 1936. The smelter treated Wiluna and Moonlight arsenical concentrates, and cyanide residues combined with pig lead and sintered lead concentrates using ore brought in from the Northampton lead mine (several hundred kilometres away near Geraldton in Western Australia).

The sintering plant was superseded by a smelter that was eventually able to process almost every ore type at Wiluna. The smelter produced a gold bearing lead bullion assaying 11 per cent antimony, one per cent arsenic and 0.5 per cent copper that presented unusual refining problems. A process was developed by the company consisting of five stages:

1. hot drossing using sawdust
2. arsenic refining by adding caustic antimonial slag
3. copper refining by adding sawdust
4. second stage of copper refining
5. de-golding by adding zinc

The smelting process obtained about five per cent higher recovery than the roasting and cyanidation process.

In 1935 Wiluna became the second largest gold mine in Australia, behind only the Lake View and Star mine at Kalgoorlie-Boulder, and production peaked at 4.4 tonnes (141 thousand troy ounces) of gold in 1938.

With the outbreak of the Second World War, Wiluna started to decline once more as the men had to join the services, and declining grades at depth reduced profitability. The Commonwealth Government declared the Wiluna gold mine a protected industry due to the arsenic production used to enhance military shell fragmentation, and a Commonwealth Government subsidy was received in 1944–45. The mine lasted for some more years until 1947, when all machinery was sold off and Wiluna went into a form of hibernation.

=== Third phase: 1980's to today ===
The third rejuvenation of Wiluna started in the early 1980s. Unlike the previous two phases, the town did not profit as much, as fly-in fly-out rosters meant there was no significant population growth. Initially, legacy tailings were re-treated to recover gold using the newly developed CIP processing technology, and from 1987 to 1994 oxide ore was mined from open pits developed over the historical underground deposits of East Lode, West Lode, Happy Jack, Bulletin, Squib, Essex and North Lode. In 1993, Wiluna Mines discovered thick high-grade mineralisation in a sulphide lode below the Bulletin pit, and from 1994 onwards open pit and underground operations commenced on sulphide ore.

Wiluna Mines installed a Biox processing plant, which is a pretreatment process for refractory gold ores or concentrates, using naturally occurring bacteria to break down the sulphide ore and liberate the gold for subsequent cyanidation. The advantage of the Biox process is its environmental friendliness, whereas disadvantages include the challenges of maintaining steady conditions for bacteria survival.

In the period 1993 to 2013, total gold recovery through the Biox operation was approximately 83%, resulting in a large amount of gold reporting to tailings over the 30-year period. The tailings dams contain a large indicated mineral resource of 33.2 million tonnes (73 billion pounds) at 0.57 grams per tonne (0.017 ozt/short ton) for 19.0 tonnes (611 thousand troy ounces), including a probable ore reserve of 22.9 million tonnes (50 billion pounds) at 0.56 grams per tonne (0.016 ozt/short ton) for 12.8 tonnes (411 thousand troy ounces), and are the subject of the current tailings re-treatment operations.

The mine operated successfully through the 1990s, and production peaked in 1998 at 4.3 tonnes (137 thousand troy ounces) at close to 8 grams per tonne (0.23 ozt/short ton) head grade.

On 21 August 1997, Great Central Mines made a takeover offer for Wiluna Mines. Great Central Mines acquired the necessary 90% acceptance and moved to compulsory acquisition on 5 January 1998.

In June 2000, Wiluna was acquired in a package with the Bronzewing Gold Mine and the Jundee Gold Mine when Great Central Mines was taken over by Normandy Mining. Normandy, in turn, was taken over by the Newmont Mining Corporation in February 2002.

In 2003, Agincourt Resources purchased Wiluna and conducted extensive resource development drilling which led to the successful development of multiple new high-grade mining fronts. Agincourt also mined the free-milling Williamson deposit 17 kilometres (11 mi) to the south of Wiluna. In 2007 Agincourt was acquired by Oxiana in a friendly takeover bid; however, Oxiana's main objective was understood to be Agincourt's Martabe gold project in Indonesia. At the time of sale, Agincourt had mined out the known deposits leaving only 9.3 tonnes (300 thousand troy ounces) of gold in reserves. Oxiana on-sold Wiluna in July 2007 to Apex Minerals.

==== 2007 ====
Having purchased the mine in July 2007 for $29.5 million, Apex immediately placed the mine on care and maintenance in order to advance studies on a three-mine strategy to feed the Biox plant from Wiluna and its two other refractory projects located within trucking distance at Gidgee and Youanmi.

==== 2008 ====
On 19 March 2008, Apex announced the raising of $62 million to fund the company's program to resume gold production by the end of 2008. The company announced a loss in excess of $60 million for the financial year up to 30 June 2008. Despite the loss, it paid out a bonus of $100,000 to each of its three executive directors, increasing their combined wage, including options, from $1,086,861 (2006–07) to $2,715,923 (2007–08).

The company raised a further $58.5 million in September 2008 to be able to continue its projects. Of this, $30 million was earmarked for exploration activities while the remainder was to go towards protecting the company from the exposure to the Australian dollar gold price and the start up of its operations, which were scheduled for Wiluna for October 2008, for Gidgee in February 2009 and for Youanmi in the second half of 2009. Production for the 2009 calendar year was scheduled at 4.7 tonnes (150 thousand troy ounces), rising to 6.2 tonnes (200 thousand troy ounces) the following year.

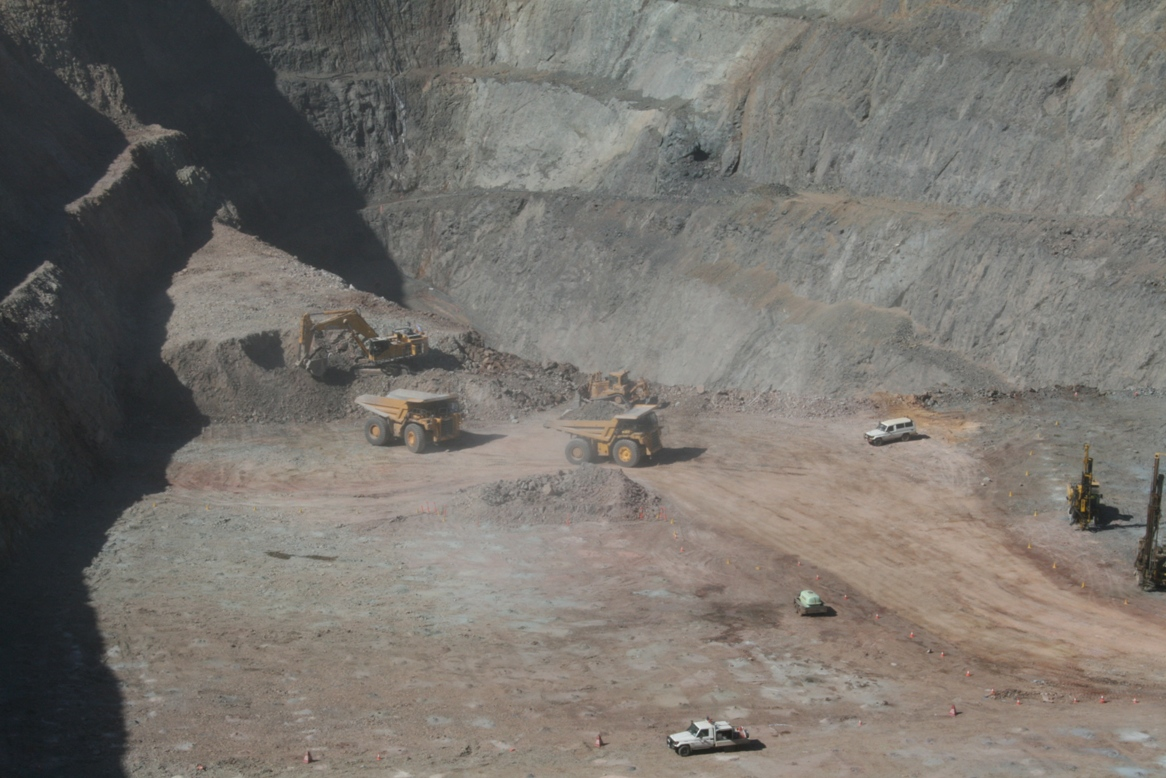
Wiluna East Pit

Delays in the commissioning of the mills were announced on 9 December 2008, making a start of full production in 2008 impossible; however full throughput was achieved. The difference between full production and full throughput is the large residence time required by the Biox process. Apex announced its first gold pour on 22 December 2008. To compensate for these delays, Apex announced on 27 January 2009 the raising of a further $20 million to cover the shortfall in revenue, bringing the overall figure of investment in Wiluna and related projects to $140 million. This was achieved by issuing a further 72.5 million shares. It further declared that production had reached 0.22 tonnes (7,000 troy ounces) per month and would ramp up to the expected 3.7 tonnes (120 thousand troy ounces) per year in February 2009. Apex also considered the option to claim certain amounts of the costs involved in the upgrade from the previous owner, formerly Oxiana, now OZ Minerals. In May 2010, Apex reached a settlement with OZ Minerals, receiving $3 million in compensation.

In its quarterly activities report for the three-month up to end of December 2008, the company declared gold production of 12.0 kilograms (385 troy ounces). In March 2009 the company announced that it had reached full production, averaging 9.0 kilograms (290 troy ounces) of gold per day for February.

==== 2009 ====
Apex announced yet another capital raising on 18 May 2009, receiving $28 million through a share placement and increasing the money invested in the Wiluna project to $168 million. Apex stated lower than expected production in their underground operations as their reason for this further capital raising.

For the second quarter of 2009, the company declared it had reached its production target of 0.93 tonnes (30 thousand troy ounces) of gold per month. Its cash costs however were at $952, almost $400 above the company's target of $560. Apex projected that it could cut production costs per ounce by $40 for every additional 31 kilograms (1,000 troy ounces) produced each month. While the mining operations in Wiluna itself in the June 2009 quarter achieved a profit of $9,995,000, the company suffered an overall loss of $113,762,000 for the 2008–09 tax year.

In a low-key announcement on 31 July 2009, Apex declared that Glenn Jardine, director of operations, had resigned from his position without stating any reasons for his departure.

On 22 September 2009, Apex declared a trading halt to its shares and the possibility that it may go into voluntary suspension of trading to receive enough time to complete another capital raising. After having deviated from its original three-mine strategy and only processed ore from the Wiluna operations, leaving the Gidgee and Youanmi operations in care and maintenance, the company now decided to return to multiple feed for its Wiluna processing facility, the one feed strategy having failed. To achieve this, it raised enough money to cover its debt and regain $50 million in working capital. With its current debt level estimated to be around $60 million, the company had to raise another $110 million, bringing its investment into its gold mining operations to around $300 million.

==== 2010 ====
Ultimately, Apex failed during its ownership of Wiluna to deliver sufficient tonnes at sufficient grade from the underground mine, and production peaked at less than 2.2 tonnes (70 thousand troy ounces) in the financial year ending 30 June 2010.

Apex returned to its previously abandoned strategy of sourcing ore from Gidgee as well as Wiluna for its processing facility. It planned to commence mining at Gidgee once more in March 2010 and transport ore to Wiluna. In late December 2009, Apex announced a further delay with the development of the Gidgee mine because of the need of an upgrade of the Gidgee–Wiluna road. Apex anticipated that mining could be delayed another two or three-month, but, as of the end of July 2010, no further mention of the Gidgee mine being reopened has been made. Apex put up its Younami mine for sale in April 2010, abandoning its strategy to source ore from there for the Wiluna mine.

The company announced a trading halt on 4 August 2010, in the wake of a loss of $20 per 31 grams (1 troy ounce) of gold produced in the June quarter, despite cutting costs and boosting production at the Wiluna mine. Apex, cash strapped and feared to be teetering on the brink of collapse, planned to raise $5 million through another capital raising. The company issued 250 million new shares at 2 cents per share and resumed trading on 6 August.

After continued loses at the operation, the mine achieved a profitable quarter in late 2010, being able to reduce operating cost to below $900 per ounce for the first time. It also increased cash reserves from $180,000 to over one million.

==== 2011 ====
On 27 January, Apex announced a trading halt for the purpose of yet another capital raising, an asset sale and a restructuring. The company sold the Gidgee Gold Mine to Panoramic Resources, with Apex retaining the rights to the Wilson deposit. Panoramic purchased the mine for A$15.5 million. It also raised A$22.6 million through a share placement.

After continuous production improvements in 2010, the first quarter in 2011 was a disappointment, with lower production and grade figures and higher operating costs. Reasons for the slip in production were power outages, reduced availability of underground hauling and loading equipment and rain affecting the operation.

==== 2012 ====
After coming close to collapse in early 2010, Apex once more experienced financial difficulties in late 2011 with claims that it was unable to pay its employees. After continuing production shortfalls and high production costs the company announced another capital raising in February 2012. After entering voluntary suspension on the ASX, Apex was able to announce the plan to raise A$20 million on 7 March 2012. As part of the capital rising the managing director of Apex, Mark Ashley, would resign and be replaced with Ed Eshuys, a former exploration manager of Great Central Mines and managing director of St Barbara.

A turn-around strategy was initiated and production began to improve, with production targeted from shallower high-grade zones on the East and West Lodes.

==== 2013 ====
In 2013, however, the turn-around remained incomplete and the Australian dollar gold price had declined markedly, from nearly $1,800 per ounce in late 2012 to below $1,300 per ounce in June 2013.

Apex Minerals announced on 17 May 2013 that it had signed a final sale and purchase agreement with Oz Youanmi Gold Pty Ltd (formerly Infinity Fame Pty Ltd) for the sale of the Youanmi Gold Project ("Youanmi"). Apex Minerals advised on 20 May 2013 that it had terminated the memorandum of understanding with Everprosperity Investment Co Ltd ("Everprosperity") for the sale of the Wiluna Gold Mine ("Wiluna"). Amid ongoing financial distress and following a series of mechanical breakdowns the mine was placed into voluntary administration and the receivers, Ferrier and Hodgson, were called in by the main creditor, RF Capital, on 25 June 2013. The mine was put into care and maintenance on 1 July 2013. On 19 July 2013, Ferrier Hodgson advertised for expressions of interest for the project's assets or for participation in a financial reorganisation of the companies.

==== Blackham Resources–Wiluna Mining Corporation 2011 to present ====
In 2011, Blackham Resources Ltd purchased regional tenements surrounding Wiluna from Kimba Resources Pty Ltd (which had acquired the tenements from MMG in its takeover of Oxiana), including the Matilda, Lake Way and Galaxy non-refractory deposits.

In 2014, Blackham acquired the Wiluna mine from Apex for $2 million upfront and $2.6 million in deferred production payments, effectively consolidating the geological belt, processing plant, and infrastructure, and providing a processing solution for Blackham’s gold deposits.

In February 2016, following significant investment in exploration across the portfolio of gold deposits and on feasibility studies in the period since acquisition, Blackham published a positive Definitive Feasibility Study outlining a plan to re-commission the Wiluna gold plant on base load free-milling ore from a variety of geologically distinct ore sources, being Matilda followed by Williamson and supplemented by higher grade quartz reef feed from the Golden Age underground deposit at Wiluna and the Galaxy open pit.

In July 2016, Blackham recommenced open pit mining under its free-milling strategy, with ore processed through the CIP plant with first gold poured in October 2016.

In September 2016, Blackham commenced a major 25,000m drilling program over sulphide deposits at the Wiluna mining centre as part of an expansion strategy, aimed at expanding production to greater than 200,000oz pa over a long mine life based on the very large sulphide resource. Ongoing success at defining broad and high-grade gold intersections led to a further 50,000m infill drilling program starting in early 2017, and a positive Prefeasibility Study that confirmed the potential to expand the mine to greater than 200,000oz pa. An open pit mineral resource of 1.5Moz situated within a potential 3.5 km-long open pit was published in October 2017.

In late 2017, however, Blackham experienced delayed cash inflows as a result of pit wall instability at the Matilda mine and higher waste stripping than anticipated, necessitating a significant recapitalisation in early 2018. Operations performed well for the remainder of financial year 2018.

In 2018, Blackham undertook resource definition drilling of legacy tailings stored on surface close to the Wiluna processing plant that had accumulated over the 30-year period of Biox operations up to the cessation of Apex’s operations in 2013. An initial tailings resource was published comprising 33.6Mt @ 0.57g/t, with potential gold recoveries of 42-50% estimated from initial testwork using conventional CIP processing.

Drilling continued across Blackham’s portfolio of gold deposits, with 100,000m drilled in the 18 months to October 2018, and open pit reserves increased to 867koz @ 2.5g/t as at 30 June 2018.

In late 2018 open pit mining recommenced at the Wiluna centre, although head grades were lower than expected due to resource grade estimation methodology, and narrow and complex lodes resulting in excessive waste dilution given the grade control and mining practices at the time.

Further capital was raised in March 2019, February 2020 and May 2021 to support extensive resource and reserve definition drilling at Wiluna, and construction of a sulphide flotation plant as the first stage of planned sulphide production to initially 100,000 to 120,000oz per annum, and then +200,000oz per annum based on the ability to process both free-milling and refractory ores.

Sulphide concentrates were to be sold to offtake customers in Russia and elsewhere internationally as Stage 1 of Wiluna Mining's 3-stage strategy to re-develop and optimise the operation:

- Stage 1: targeting 120,000oz per annum from new tailings retreatment facility (Wiltails), combined with the re-developed underground mine and the new sulphide flotation plant.
- Stage 2: targeting over 200,000oz per annum from expanded mine and additional flotation capacity.
- Stage 3: pressure Oxidation technology (POX) to produce gold dore on site.

Blackham Resources was rebranded as the Wiluna Mining Corporation in early 2020.

In the 18 months to 31 December 2021, Wiluna Mining Corporation invested $188 million in the redevelopment of Wiluna, with comminution and flotation facilities, knelson gravity concentrator, tailings retreatment facility, new tailings storage, camp and power upgrades, mine dewatering, 178,000m of drilling, 10,000m of underground development, and technical studies.

The first concentrate shipment departed for Polymetal in Russia on 28 February 2022 but less than a week later, on 4 March 2022, the company suspended shipments to Russia owing to uncertainty around the situation in Ukraine.

In July 2022, Wiluna Mining Corporation was placed into voluntary administration owing to the combined impacts of logistical chain constraints, industry-wide cost inflation, tightening of creditor payment terms, staff unavailability and broader COVID-19 effects, and project ramp up issues. The underground mine was placed on care and maintenance and processing of ore stockpiles continued until February 2023. Since March 2023, legacy tailings and low-grade stockpiles have been mined and treated profitably through a new tailings retreatment facility.

Studies have continued on restarting the mine, with a mineral resource update and a Prefeasibility Study completed, which evaluated open pit and underground mining, and sulphide processing using the idle Biox plant to produce gold dore on site.

== Production ==
=== 1984 to 2007 ===
Pre-APEX production figures were:

Year	Production	Grade	Cost per ounce
1997–98	83,782 ounces	8.25 g/t	A$353
1998–99	134,704 ounces	7.77 g/t	US$208
1999	131,470 ounces		
2000	117,974 ounces	6.47 g/t	A$ 335
2001	117,360 ounces	5.53 g/t	A$423
2002	117,415 ounces		
2002–03			
2003–04 ^{1}	67,756 ounces		
2004–05	111,280 ounces		A$494
2005–06	113,607 ounces		
2006 ^{2}	48,024 ounces		A$687

- ^{1} December 2003 (sale of mine to Agincourt) to June 2004 only.
- ^{2} July to December 2006 only.
- Mine closed in July 2007.

=== 2008 onwards ===
Since resumption of production in December 2008, the company has announced the following production figures:

Year	Production	Grade	Cost per ounce
Fourth Quarter 2008	385 ounces	3.65 g/t	not announced
First Quarter 2009	17,137 ounces	4.15 g/t	not announced
Second Quarter 2009	26,080 ounces	5.04 g/t	A$952
2008–09	44,000 ounces	4.54 g/t	A$952
Third Quarter 2009	19,900 ounces	3.7 g/t	A$1,222
Fourth Quarter 2009	18,369 ounces	3.7 g/t	A$1,089
First Quarter 2010	14,100 ounces	3.6 g/t	A$1,485
Second Quarter 2010	16,307 ounces	4.29 g/t	A$1,374
2009–10	68,629 ounces	3.79 g/t	A$1,276
Third Quarter 2010	19,300 ounces	5.35 g/t	A$1,250
Fourth Quarter 2010	19,500 ounces	6.00 g/t	A$890
First Quarter 2011	15,099 ounces	4.31 g/t	A$1,044
Second Quarter 2011	14,100 ounces	4.55 g/t	A$1,300
2010–11	68,049 ounces	5.06 g/t	A$1,120

=== Blackham Resources–Wiluna Mining Corporation ===
Annual production under the ownership of Blackham Resources, later renamed to Wiluna Mining Corporation:

Year	Production	Grade	Cost per ounce
2016–17	39,413 ounces	1.4 g/t	
2017–18	70,565 ounces	1.4 g/t	A$1,629
2018–19	65,406 ounces	1.3 g/t	A$1,760
2019–20	61,885 ounces	1.4 g/t	A$1,950
2020–21	51,552 ounces	1.4 g/t	A$1,794
2021–22	41,986 ounces		

== Owners ==
Company	From	To
Barrack Mines	May 1984	January 1991
Asarco Gold	January 1991	January 1994
Wiluna Mines	January 1994	December 1997
Great Central Mines	December 1997	April 2000
Normandy Mining	April 2000	February 2002
Newmont Australia	February 2002	December 2003
Agincourt Resources	December 2003	April 2007
Oxiana Limited	April 2007	July 2007
APEX Minerals NL	July 2007	March 2014
Wiluna Mining Corporation (formerly Blackham Resources)	March 2014	Present
