= Ferrier Hodgson =

Australia-Asia Pacific accountancy company

- Company type: Limited liability partnership
- Industry: Accounting; Professional Services
- Founded: 1976
- Defunct: 2019
- Headquarters: Sydney, Australia
- Services: Corporate Recovery; Corporate Advisory; Forensics
- Revenue: $93 million (2012)
- Website: www.ferrierhodgson.com

Ferrier Hodgson was a firm specialising in corporate recovery, corporate advisory, forensic accounting and forensic IT. The firm has a specialist management consulting arm called Azurium.

Ferrier Hodgson was established in 1976 by founders Tony Hodgson and Ian Ferrier. It became one of the largest specialist corporate turnaround and insolvency management firms in the Asia Pacific. The group had eight offices across the major business centers in Australia, Malaysia and Singapore, with 34 partners and more than 320 staff across the region. Ferrier Hodgson was taken over by KPMG in March 2019.

== Azurium ==
Ferrier Hodgson's specialist consulting arm, Azurium, was a specialist provider of enterprise improvement and advisory services with offices in Melbourne and Sydney. The Azurium team includes business architects, real estate professionals and experts in analytics, technology and valuation.

== Media ==
Ferrier Hodgson was ranked number 15 in the BRW top 100 Accounting Firms in 2012 with an estimated $93 million in fee revenue during the 2011/12 financial year. The group's head office is located in Sydney.
