= Thunderbox Gold Mine =

Gold mine in Western Australia

Thunderbox
- Location in Western Australia
- Interactive map of Thunderbox
- Location: Leinster, Western Australia, Australia; 28°10′52″S 121°00′00″E
- Products: Gold
- Production: 159,782 ounces
- Financial year: 2022–23
- Opened: 2002
- Active: 2002–2007 2016–present
- Company: Northern Star Resources
- Website: www.nsrltd.com
- Acquired: 2021

The Thunderbox Gold Mine is a gold mine 41 km south-east of Leinster, Western Australia. It was formerly owned by Norilsk Nickel, which placed it in care and maintenance in 2007, but is now owned by Northern Star Resources.

== Ethymology ==
The mine is named after the colloquial Australian term for a toilet, thunderbox, which was given to the site in its early exploration days because the only available toilet on site was a 44 gallon drum on top of an old drill hole.

== History ==
Gold mines in the Mid West region

The Thunderbox gold deposit is a relatively recent discovery by Western Australian gold mining standards, having been located through drilling in mid-1999. The deposit was jointly owned by Lionore (60%) and Dalrymple Resources (40%).

The owners conducted a feasibility study in 2001 and predicted a mine life of five years and a gold resource of 850,000 ounces, to be mined in an open-pit operation. The company moved the processing plant from Mount Todd to the mine, and first gold production was achieved at the end of 2002.

In mid-2003, Lionore and Dalrymple announced a merger of the two companies, with the new entity continuing to be called Lionore.

After good results in the mine's first two years of operation, Thunderbox suffered a difficult 2005, with lower-than-expected production in the second half of the year. Water shortages and equipment reliability issues were two of the main reasons for the decline in production, but write-downs because of its short remaining mine life led to large financial losses for the Thunderbox operation. Lionore at this stage was contemplating selling the mine.

In April 2007, it was once more reported that the mine was for sale.

Norilsk acquired the mine in June 2007, when it took over Lionore Mining.

Lionore Mining was taken over by Russian company Norilsk in June 2007, after a bidding war between Norilsk and Xstrata saw the former succeeding with the higher offer. Xstrata had originally offered C$18.50 for every Lionore share, countered by a Norilsk offer of C$21.50 per share. Xstrata raised their offer to C$25, which forced Norilsk to present a final offer of C$27.50.

Shortly after the takeover, Norilsk announced that it would not continue mining at Thunderbox, instead preferring to concentrate on the company's nickel projects. The mine eventually closed in November 2007.

After the closure of the mine, Norilsk used the camp at Thunderbox for accommodation for its workers at the nearby Waterloo Nickel Mine, until the latter was also placed into care and maintenance.

In January 2014, Saracen Mineral Holdings purchased the mine alongside the Bannockburn Gold Mine and the Waterloo Nickel Mine, for an immediate A$20 million cash payment, a production- and gold price related deferred A$3 million cash payment and up to A$17 million in royalties.

The board of Saracen Mineral Holdings approved a project to develop the Thunderbox deposit in quarter three of the 2015 financial year, with prestrip mining commencing in 2015. First gold was poured in February 2016.

In October 2020, a merger between Northern Star Resources and Saracen Metal Holdings was proposed. The merger was completed in February 2021 when Saracen was de-listed from the Australian Securities Exchange, the Northern Star Resources mine thereby passing into Northern Star's ownership.

As of 2022, mining occurs in both open pit and underground operations.

== Production ==
Production figures of the mine:

Year	Production	Grade	Cost per ounce
2002	17,790 ounces	2.38 g/t	US$95
2003	212,459 ounces		US$138
2004	156,916 ounces		US$265
2005	145,413 ounces		US$339
2006	155,203 ounces		US$352
2007 ^{[2]}	39,345 ounces		US$518
2007–2016	Care and maintenance		
2016–17			
2017–18			
2018–19			
2019–20	184,538 ounces		A$731
2020–21	143,990 ounces		A$924
2021–22	132,502 ounces	1.5 g/t	A$1,817
2022–23	159,782 ounces	1.4 g/t	A$2,116

== Notes ==
- ^[1]The Thunderbox Gold Mine is part of the Yandal Production Centre but production figures were reported separately for 2020–21 as it was a new acquisition.
- ^[2]Results for January to March 2007 quarter only.
