= Mark Creasy =

Mining entrepreneur of Western Australia

- Born: 1944 (age 81–82)
- Occupation: Mining entrepreneur
- Spouse: Sharon Creasy (separated)

Mark Gareth Creasy (born 1944) is a Western Australian mining entrepreneur.

== Biography ==
Creasy arrived in Australia in the 1960s, and trained as a mining engineer.

He has developed various mining projects in Western Australia and other states. By 2010 his net worth was claimed to be $283 million (AU).

Creasy had discovered the Bronzewing Gold Mine, and had sold the mine in the 1990s. By the early 2000s he had had a ten-year-long legal battle over Bronzewing South tenements with rival Leith Beal.

Many journalists fall back on terms such as Midas, and prospector, when describing Creasy's wealth and achievement in finding and investing in resources. Creasy pledged A$500,000 towards the construction of a statue called Ascalon in Cathedral Square, Perth, and also contributed towards floating rocks in fountains in Forrest Place and the Carlisle operations of the Department of Mines Industry Regulation and Safety.

At the age of 74 in 2018, Creasy made claims of not retiring, but reducing investments and activities. He also has been identified as being very private, despite occasional insights from newspaper articles and avoiding media exposure, despite the very public controversies around The Cliffe. Creasy has also supported publication of historical materials about Western Australian history.

Creasy has stakes in between 40-50 listed companies, most of which are junior explorers.

=== Net worth ===
Year	Financial Review Rich List		Forbes Australia's 50 Richest	
Year	Rank	Net worth (A$)	Rank	Net worth (US$)
2017		$610 million		
2018	114 ▲	$689 million ▲		
2019	149 ▼	$660 million ▼		
2020	116 ▲	$853 million ▲		
2021	127 ▼	$857 million ▲		
2022	86 ▲	$1.50 billion ▲		
2023	97 ▼	$1.45 billion ▼		
2024		$1.20 billion ▼		
2025	178 ▼	$859 million ▼		

Legend
Icon	Description
Steady	Has not changed from the previous year
▲	Has increased from the previous year
▼	Has decreased from the previous year
