= Newmont =

American mining company

Newmont Corporation
- Formerly: Newmont Mining Corporation; Newmont Goldcorp Corporation
- Type: Public
- Traded as: NYSE: NEM; S&P 500 component; TSX: NGT; ASX: NEM
- ISIN: US6516391066
- Industry: Metals and Mining
- Founded: 1921; 105 years ago
- Founder: William Boyce Thompson
- Headquarters: Denver, Colorado, U.S.
- Key people: Natascha Viljoen (president and CEO); Gregory H. Boyce (chairman)
- Products: Gold, copper, silver, zinc, lead
- Revenue: ▲US$22.7 billion (2025)
- Operating income: ▲US$9.89 billion (2025)
- Net income: ▲US$7.09 billion (2025)
- Total assets: ▲US$57.1 billion (2025)
- Total equity: ▲US$33.9 billion (2025)
- Number of employees: 17,500 (2025)
- Subsidiaries: Goldcorp; Oroplata S.A.; South Kalgoorlie Gold Mine
- Website: newmont.com

Newmont Corporation is an American gold mining company based in Denver, Colorado. It is the world's largest gold mining corporation. Incorporated in 1921, it holds ownership of gold mines in the United States, Canada, Mexico, the Dominican Republic, Australia, Ghana, Argentina, Peru, and Suriname. Newmont is also a partial owner of Nevada Gold Mines in Nevada with Barrick Mining being the majority owner and operator. In addition to gold, Newmont mines copper, silver, zinc and lead.

The Newmont Corporation bought Canadian mining company Goldcorp in 2019 for US$10 billion. In 2023, Newmont acquired Newcrest Mining for US$16.8 billion. Newmont is the only gold mining company listed in the S&P 500, and has approximately 31,600 employees globally (this number does not reflect the approximately 5,000 global employees laid off from August through November 2025).

== History ==
=== Early years ===
William Boyce Thompson, founder of Newmont Mining

The Newmont Company was founded in 1916 in New York by Colonel William Boyce Thompson as a holding company to invest in worldwide mineral, oil, and related companies. According to company lore, the name "Newmont" is a portmanteau "New York" and "Montana", reflecting where Thompson made his fortune and where he grew up. Newmont made its first major gold investment in 1917, with a founding 25 percent in the Anglo American Corporation of South Africa. Four years later, in 1921, the Newmont Company reincorporated as the Newmont Corporation.

In 1929, Newmont became a mining company with its first gold product by acquiring California's Empire Star Mine. By 1939, Newmont was operating 12 gold mines in North America. The company acquired interests overseas. For decades around the middle of the 20th century, Newmont had a controlling interest in the Tsumeb mine in Namibia and in the O'Okiep Copper Company in Namaqualand, South Africa. Beginning in 1925, Newmont acquired interests in a Texas oil field. Eventually, Newmont's oil interests included more than 70 blocks in the Louisiana, Gulf of Mexico area and oil and gas production in the North Sea. Fred Searls became president in 1947, after serving as the company's exploration geologist. Searls retired in 1954, and Plato Malozemoff took over as president.

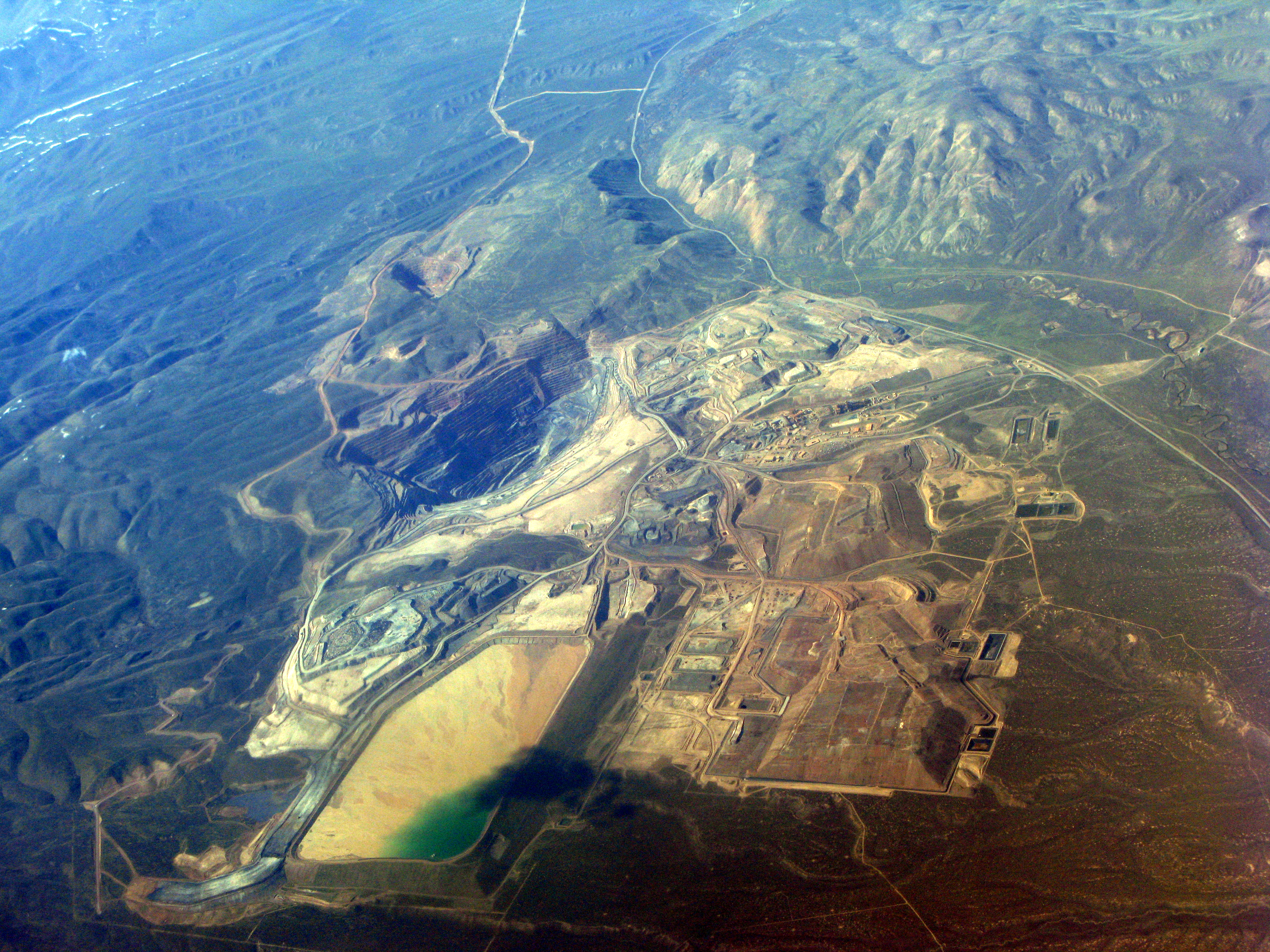
Gold Quarry mine, near Carlin, Nevada, 2009.

Newmont began mining at Carlin, Nevada, in 1965. The "Carlin Trend" or "Carlin Unconformity" is the largest gold discovery in North America during the 20th century. In 1971 Newmont began heap leaching low grade ores there. In 1971, the South-West African (now Namibia) Tsumeb & Kombat mines managed by Newmont, had its operations stopped during the 1971–72 Namibian contract workers strike over the contract labor system and apartheid.

=== Major growth ===
In the 1980s, Newmont thwarted five takeover bids – from Consolidated Gold Fields (ConsGold), T. Boone Pickens, Minorco, Hanson Industries and James Goldsmith – who sought to break Newmont apart and sell its assets in an attempt to increase shareholder value. In 1987, defending against a $6.3 billion bid by T. Boone Pickens, the company paid a US$33 per share special dividend to all shareholders, US$2.2 billion in cash, of which US$1.75 billion was borrowed. To reduce this debt the company undertook a divestment program involving all of its copper, oil, gas, and coal interests.

As a further step in the restructuring, the company moved its headquarters from New York City to Denver in 1988. A decade later, Newmont Mining Corporation and Newmont Gold Company combined assets to form a unified worldwide gold company. Shareholders of both companies had identical interests in the reserves, production and earnings of Newmont Gold's operations. Newmont then merged with Santa Fe Railroad (a former Atchison, Topeka & Santa Fe Railway subsidiary, sold in preparation for the merger that produced the BNSF) to form North America's largest gold producer.

On June 21, 2000, Newmont announced a merger with Battle Mountain Gold. The merger was completed in January 2001. In February 2002, Newmont completed the acquisition of Normandy Mining and Franco-Nevada. Newmont faced competition in its bid for Normandy from AngloGold. By eventually outbidding the South African company, Newmont became the world's largest gold producer, with an annual production in excess of 8 million ounces.

In 2007, the company eliminated its 1.5 million ounce legacy hedge book to make Newmont the world's largest unhedged gold producer. The following year, Newmont acquired Miramar Mining Corporation and its Hope Bay deposit in the Canadian Arctic.

In 2009, Newmont purchased the remaining one-third interest in Boddington Gold Mine from AngloGold Ashanti, bringing its ownership to 100 percent. In April 2011, the company acquired Canada's Fronteer Gold Inc. for CA$2.3 billion. This made the company the world's second-largest gold producer. In 2017, Newmont produced 5.65 million ounces of gold at all-in sustaining costs of US$924 per ounce. The company reported adjusted net income of $780 million for the year, and further reduced net debt down to US$0.8 billion. In 2019, it acquired Canada's Goldcorp for $10 billion. In May 2023, Newmont agreed terms to purchase Newcrest. The deal was completed in November 2023.

=== Recent Developments (2025) ===
In 2025, Newmont completed the integration of Newcrest Mining following its US$17 billion acquisition finalized in 2024, creating one of the largest gold and copper producers globally. As part of a portfolio optimization strategy, the company completed a non-core asset divestiture program announced in 2024, generating up to US$4.3 billion in gross proceeds through the sale of operations including Musselwhite, Éléonore, Cripple Creek & Victor, Akyem, and Porcupine. Operationally, Newmont achieved commercial production at its Ahafo North project in Ghana in October 2025, following a first gold pour in September. Financially, the company reported record free cash flow of US$1.6 billion in the third quarter of 2025, its fourth consecutive quarter above US$1 billion, alongside revenue of US$5.52 billion and net income of US$1.84 billion.

In December 2025, Chief Executive Officer Tom Palmer announced his retirement, with Natascha Viljoen appointed as his successor effective January 2026, becoming the company’s first female CEO. The company also advanced its sustainability goals, investing US$500 million in environmental, social, and governance programs and reporting progress toward its 2050 net-zero target, including reductions in carbon emissions and expanded water stewardship initiatives.

== Controversies ==
=== Buyat Bay, Sulawesi, Indonesia ===
In August 2004, the Indonesian Ministry of Environment filed a civil lawsuit against Newmont, claiming tailings from the company's Minahasa Raya mine polluted Buyat Bay. The company was cleared by an Indonesian court, with the judge ruling the pollution charges could not be proven.

=== Ghana ===
In 2009, Newmont earned the ironic Public Eye on Davos award (a criticism for "purely profit-oriented globalization") for its Akyem project in Ghana. Newmont said the award was issued based on several paragraphs of text which “clearly were intended to distort the facts”.

In 2010, Newmont was fined $4.9 million by the Ghanaian Environmental Protection Agency for not preventing, reporting and investigating a cyanide spill at Ahafo mine in an "appropriate and timely manner".

=== Australia ===
In May 2025, Newmont Corporation was fined $350,000 by the New South Wales Environment Protection Authority for environmental violations discovered at the company's Cadia gold mine. The ventilation site exceeded the limits for airborne solid dust particles on five occasions between 2021 and 2023. In addition to the fine, Newmont was ordered to pay NSW's Department of Climate Change, Energy, the Environment and Water $61,500 to fund a new dust monitoring system.

=== Securities Fraud Class Action Lawsuits ===
In 2025, Newmont faced multiple class action lawsuits alleging violations of federal securities laws. The suits claim that between February 22, 2024, and October 23, 2024, the company and its executives made false or misleading statements regarding production capabilities and cost management at Tier 1 assets, including Lihir in Papua New Guinea and Brucejack in Canada. These allegations followed disappointing third-quarter 2024 results, which revealed lower production and higher costs, causing Newmont's stock price to fall sharply.

=== Human Rights and Fatalities at Ahafo Mine ===
In January 2025, three people were killed and four injured during a confrontation between local residents and police contracted by Newmont at its Ahafo South Mine in Ghana. Reports indicate the incident occurred when locals allegedly attempted to extract leftover gold from a tailings dam. Civil society organizations called for an independent investigation into human rights abuses and criticized Newmont’s security protocols.

=== Environmental and Safety Issues at Red Chris Mine ===
In July 2025, Newmont’s Red Chris Mine in British Columbia suspended operations following two fall-of-ground incidents that trapped workers. The mine also faced criticism for selenium contamination in the Stikine River watershed, which environmental groups argue threatens salmon populations and Indigenous communities. These issues raised concerns about Newmont’s environmental and safety practices.

=== Legal Battle Over Conga Mine ===
Newmont continued to face legal challenges and community opposition regarding its proposed Conga gold and copper mine in Peru. In April 2025, a Peruvian appeals court overturned a previous ruling that had halted the project due to environmental concerns, ordering a new judgment. Local communities and NGOs argue the mine threatens water sources and human rights, fueling protests and reputational risks for the company.

== Operations ==
Asset	Country	Ownership	Mine Type	Metals	Attributable gold production in 2025 (troy ounces)	Attributable gold reserves at December 31, 2025 (troy ounces)
Nevada Gold Mines (operated by Barrick)	United States	38.5%	Open Pit, Underground	Gold	999,000	17.4 million
Peñasquito Mine	Mexico	100%	Open Pit	Gold, Silver, Lead, Zinc	415,000	3.2 million
Cerro Negro mine	Argentina	100%	Underground	Gold	202,000	3.0 million
Merian	Suriname	75%	Open Pit	Gold	178,000	4.5 million
Pueblo Viejo mine (operated by Barrick)	Dominican Republic	40%	Open Pit	Gold, Silver	253,000 (Note: Accounted for as an equity method investment.)	8.2 million
Yanacocha	Peru	100%	Open Pit (heap leach)	Gold	515,000	0.5 million
Ahafo South	Ghana	100%	Open Pit, Underground	Gold	664,000	4.1 million
Ahafo North	Ghana	100%	Open Pit	Gold	70,000 (Note: Includes 21,000 ounces of development ounces. Commercial production was declared in October 2025.)	4.7 million
Boddington Gold Mine	Australia	100%	Open Pit	Gold, Copper	565,000	10.2 million
Tanami Mine	Australia	100%	Underground	Gold	391,000	5.3 million
Lihir	Papua New Guinea	100%	Open Pit	Gold	585,000	16.0 million
Cadia	Australia	100%	Underground	Gold, Copper	385,000	13.5 million
Red Chris	Canada	70%	Open Pit	Copper, Gold	62,000	3.6 million
Brucejack	Canada	100%	Underground	Gold	231,000	2.9 million

Production figures are Newmont's attributable share for calendar year 2025, rounded to thousands of ounces as reported. Newmont also holds a 32% equity interest in Lundin Gold (Fruta del Norte mine, Ecuador), which contributed 165,000 attributable ounces in 2025, and interests in non-producing projects (Wafi-Golpu, NuevaUnión and Norte Abierto) that account for part of its 118.2 million ounces of total attributable gold reserves.

== Former operations ==
Newmont has purchased and sold a number of operations in recent years:

- Red Lake Mine: Newmont completed sale of Red Lake mine for $375 million on March 31, 2020.
- Continental Gold: Newmont sold its 19.9 percent equity stake and convertible bond in Continental Gold Inc. for $260 million on March 5, 2020.
- Super Pit gold mine: Newmont sold its 50 percent stake in Kalgoorlie Consolidated Gold Mines to Northern Star Resources for $800 million in January 2020.
- Golden Grove Mine: Owned by Normandy Mining since 1991, Golden Grove was acquired by Newmont Australia Ltd in February 2002 when Newmont took over Normandy. Newmont sold the mine to Oxiana Limited in June 2005 for A$265 million.
- Pajingo: Pajingo (100% owned) is an underground mine located approximately 93 miles (150 kilometers) southwest of Townsville, Queensland, and 45 miles (72 kilometers) south of the local township of Charters Towers. Newmont sold the mine in late 2007; it is now owned by Conquest Mining.
- Bronzewing Gold Mine: View Resources purchased the mine in July 2004 from Newmont for A$9.0 million, a package that also included the Mount McClure mining operation, 8 km west of Bronzewing.
- Wiluna Gold Mine: Also part of the Normandy acquisition, in December 2003 Newmont sold Wiluna to a local management buyout team for shares and A$3.65 million in cash. The mine was onsold 3 years later for A$29.5 million.
- Zarafshan: Newmont was part of a joint venture gold project in Uzbekistan, the first major Western investment in the region since the breakup of the Soviet Union. A difficult place to operate, Uzbekistan expropriated the company's assets in 2006.
- Kori Kollo: The Kori Kollo open pit mine is on a high plain in northwestern Bolivia near Oruro, on government mining concessions issued to a Bolivian corporation, Empresa Minera Inti Raymi S.A. (“Inti Raymi”), in which Newmont had an 88% interest. The remaining 12% was owned by Mrs. Beatriz Rocabado. Inti Raymi owned and operated the mine. On July 23, 2009, Newmont announced the transfer of its interest in Empresa Minera Inti Raymi S.A., which owned the Kori Kollo gold mine and Kori Chaca gold mine, to Compania Procesadora de Minerales S.A. ("CPM"), a company controlled by Newmont's long-time Bolivian partner Jose Mercado.
- Minahasa: Newmont owns 80% of Minahasa and the remaining 20% interest is a carried interest held by P.T. Tanjung Serapung, an unrelated Indonesian company. Minahasa is located on the island of Sulawesi, approximately 1,500 miles (2,414 kilometers) northeast of Jakarta. Mining was completed in late 2001 and gold production was completed in 2004.
- Golden Giant: Newmont's Canadian operations previously included two underground mines. Golden Giant (100% owned) was located approximately 25 miles (40 kilometers) east of Marathon, Ontario, Canada, and had been in production since 1985. Mining operations at Golden Giant were completed in December 2005 with remnant mining and milling production continuing throughout most of 2006.
- Holloway: Holloway was located approximately 35 miles (56 kilometers) east of Matheson, Ontario, and about 400 miles (644 kilometers) northeast of Golden Giant. It was in production since 1996. On November 6, 2006, Newmont completed the sale of the Holloway mine to St. Andrews Goldfields Ltd. resulting in a $13 pre-tax gain.
- Martha Mine: Newmont completed the sale of its Waihi assets in New Zealand in October 2015.
- Batu Hijau mine: Newmont completed the sale of Batu Hijau to PT Amman Mineral Internasional in 2016.
