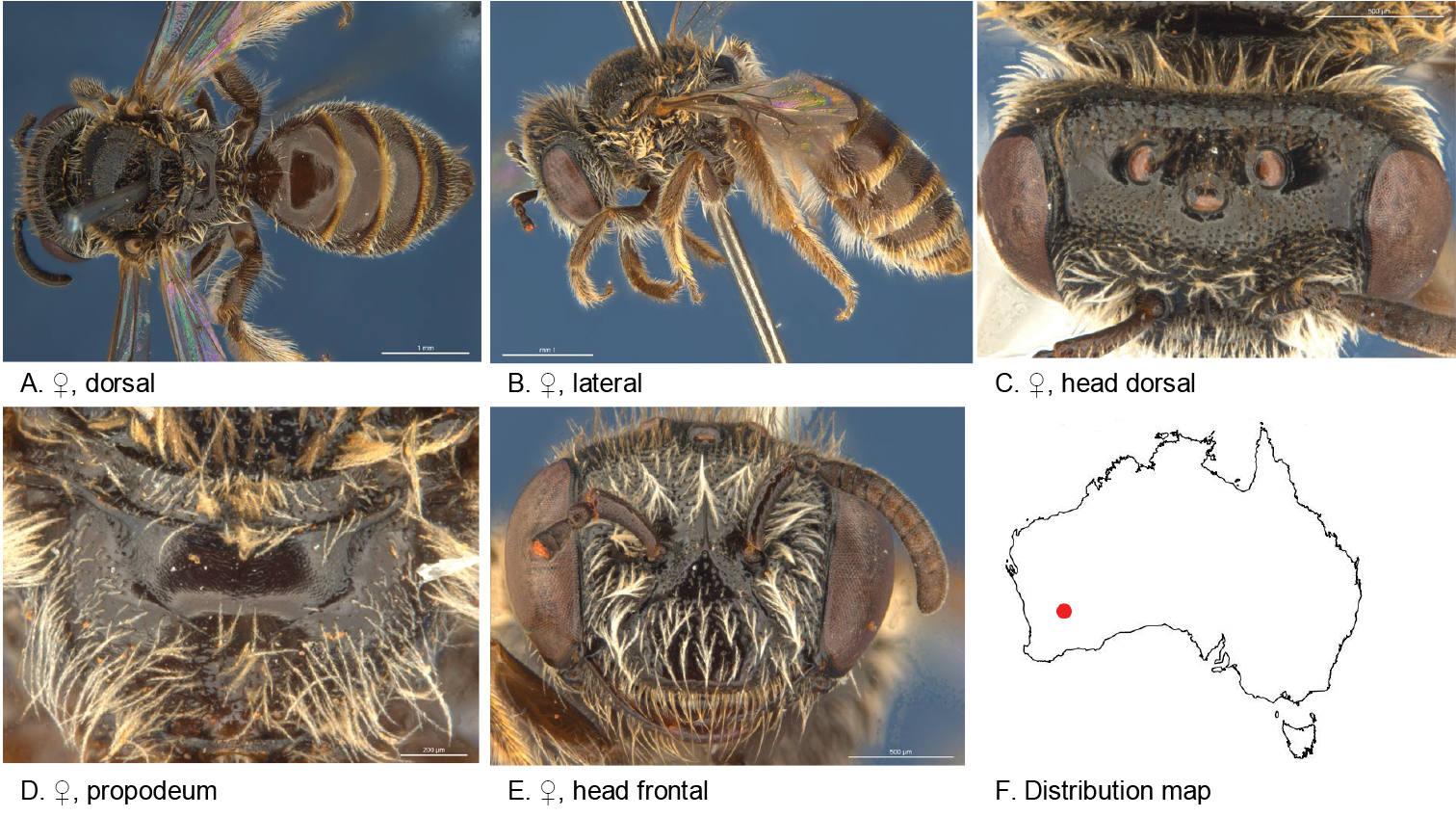
- Female holotype

Scientific classification
- Kingdom: Animalia
- Phylum: Arthropoda
- Clade: Pancrustacea
- Class: Insecta
- Order: Hymenoptera
- Family: Colletidae
- Genus: Leioproctus
- Species: L. lucidus

Binomial name
- Leioproctus lucidus Leijs 2018

= Leioproctus lucidus =

Species of bee

Leioproctus lucidus, or Leioproctus (Colletellus) lucidus, is a species of bee in the family Colletidae and subfamily Colletinae. It is endemic to Australia. It was described by entomologist Remko Leijs in 2018.

== Etymology ==
The specific epithet lucidus refers to the smooth and shiny integument on the head, scutum and terga of the bees.

== Description ==
The female holotype body length is 6 mm, head width 1.9 mm. Integumental colouration is mainly black, orange and brown. The hair is mostly white to brown.

== Distribution and habitat ==
The species occurs in south-west Western Australia. The type locality is 12 km east-north-east of Bungalbin Hill in the Helena and Aurora Range, some 100 km north of Southern Cross in the Great Western Woodlands.

== Behaviour ==
The adults are flying mellivores.
