= Westonia, Western Australia =

Town in the Wheatbelt region of Western Australia

Westonia
- Town
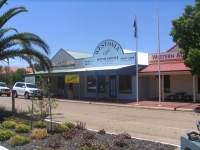
- Westonia shire offices

- Interactive map of Westonia
- Coordinates: 31°18′07″S 118°41′50″E
- Country: Australia
- State: Western Australia
- LGA: Shire of Westonia
- Location: 314 km (195 mi) E of Perth; 52 km (32 mi) E of Merredin; 77 km (48 mi) W of Southern Cross
- Established: 1910

Government
  - State electorate: Central Wheatbelt
  - Federal division: O'Connor

Area
  - Total: 306.6 km^{2} (118.4 sq mi)

Population
  - Total: 129 (SAL 2021)
- Postcode: 6423

Westonia is a small town located in the eastern Wheatbelt region of Western Australia, 10 kilometres (6 mi) north of the Great Eastern Highway. It is the main town in the Shire of Westonia.

== Toponymy ==
In 1910, a sandalwood cutter and part-time prospector named Alfred David Weston (17 May 1876 – 26 September 1924) discovered gold in the area, near Bodallin Soak, while en route to the Eastern Goldfields. As a result, the area came to be referred to as Weston's Reward and later Westons.

By 1914, people who had taken up residence in the area had changed its name and formed the Westonia Progress Association.

== History ==
By 1915 there were two major mines in the area, and the population was in excess of 500. By 1917 the area had a population of more than 2,000. In 1919, low gold prices forced the closure of the mines, and many people left the area. Westonia was gazetted as a town in February 1926. In 1935 one of the mines reopened, but closed again in 1948, only to be reopened in 1985. The mine then closed once again in 1991. In mid-2009, it was announced that mining would once again commence at Westonia's Edna May Gold Mine, with the first gold pour anticipated for May 2010, coinciding with the centenary of the discovery of gold in the district.

In October 2009, Westonia won the Tidy Towns - Sustainable Communities competition for the central Wheatbelt region. Westonia won the same title in October 2010, and was also declared the state winner in November 2010.

On 1 August 2010, the day before the start of that year's Diggers & Dealers mining conference in Kalgoorlie, Westonia hosted celebrations attended by Western Australian Premier Colin Barnett and Petroleum Minister Norman Moore to mark its centenary. During the celebrations, Barnett noted that a strong international gold price had led to a modern-day gold rush in Western Australia, and also praised Catalpa Resources for reviving the Edna May mine.

== Things to see ==
- Westonia Historic Townsite
- Wolfram Street Facades
- Westonia Caravan Park
- Westonia Common
- Boodalin Soak
- Elachbutting Rock
- Yanneymooning Reserve
- Baladjie Rock
- Edna May Gold Mine

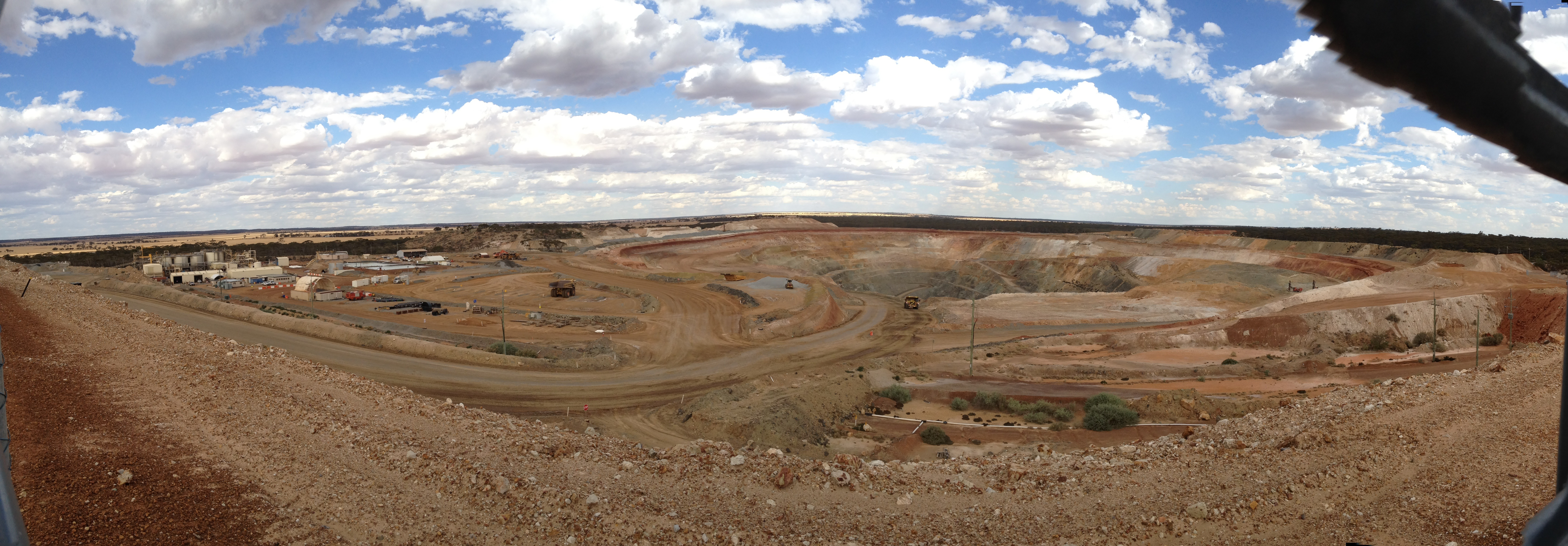
Westonia Mine from the viewing platform.
