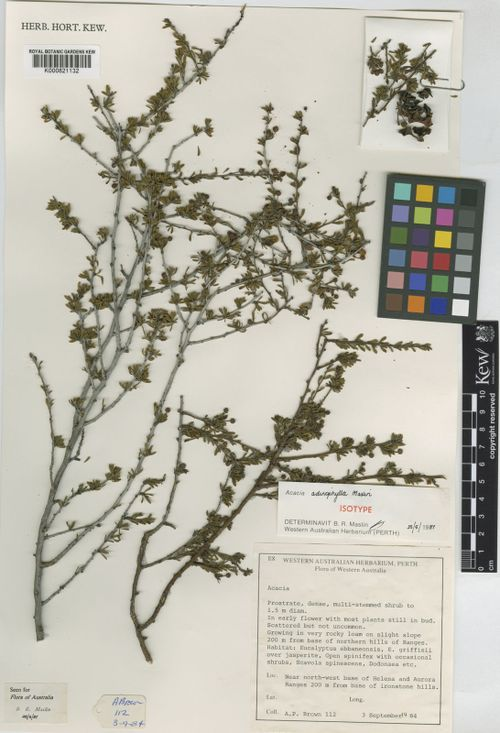
- Isotype in Royal Botanic Gardens, Kew

Conservation status
- Priority One — Poorly Known Taxa (DEC)

Scientific classification
- Kingdom: Plantae
- Clade: Tracheophytes
- Clade: Angiosperms
- Clade: Eudicots
- Clade: Rosids
- Order: Fabales
- Family: Fabaceae
- Subfamily: Caesalpinioideae
- Clade: Mimosoid clade
- Genus: Acacia
- Species: A. adinophylla

Binomial name
- Acacia adinophylla Maslin
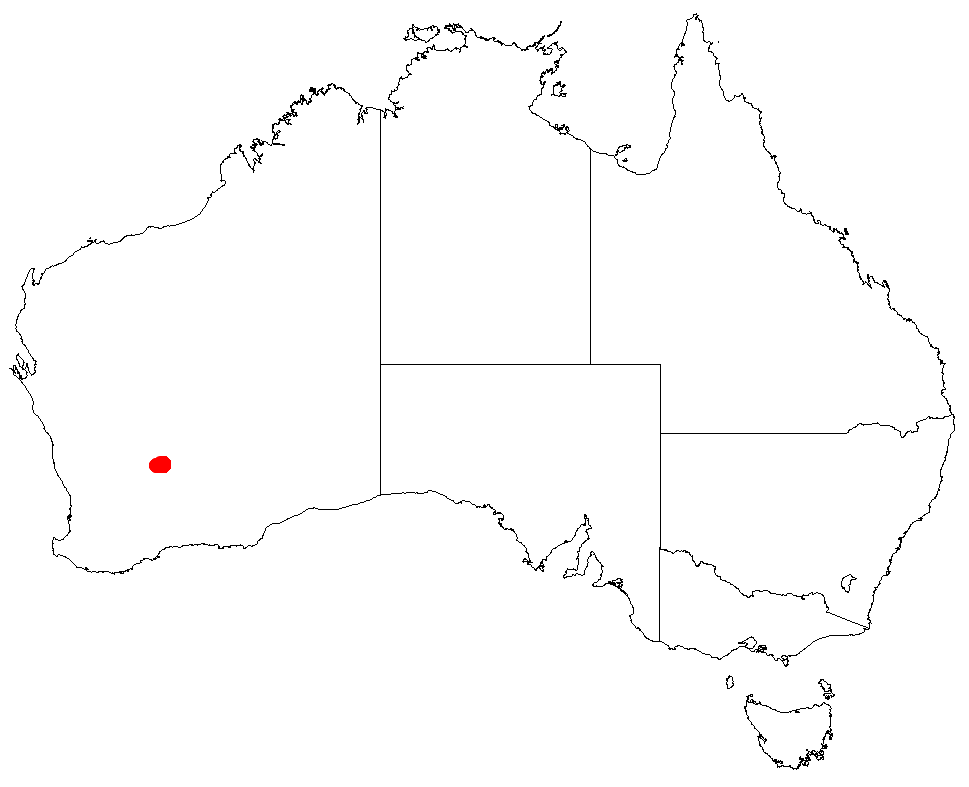
- Occurrence data from AVH

= Acacia adinophylla =

Species of legume

Acacia adinophylla is a species of flowering plant in the family Fabaceae and is endemic to a small area in the south-west of Western Australia. It is a prostrate to erect, scrambling shrub with cylindrical branchlets, narrowly wedge-shaped to lance-shaped phyllodes, flowers arranged in up to 4 spherical heads of dull golden yellow flowers, and paper-like pods.

== Description ==
Acacia adinophylla is a prostrate to erect, dense, scrambling shrub that typically grows up to 1.5 m (4 ft 11 in) high and 1.7 m (5 ft 7 in) wide and has cylindrical branchlets usually covered with soft hairs. Its phyllodes are crowded on side branches, narrowly wedge-shaped to lance-shaped with the narrower end towards the base, 3–7 mm (0.12–0.28 in) long and 1–2 mm (0.039–0.079 in) wide, thick and flat. There are triangular stipules 0.5–1.0 mm (0.020–0.039 in) long at the base of the phyllodes. The flowers are arranged in up to 4 spherical head 5–6 mm (0.20–0.24 in) in diameter, on a peduncle 6–15 mm (0.24–0.59 in) long. The heads contain 20 to 30 dull golden-yellow flowers. Flowering has been observed in June and from September to December, and the pod is firmly papery, narrowly oblong, up to 20 mm (0.79 in) long and 5–7 mm (0.20–0.28 in) wide, and scarcely constricted between the seeds. The seeds are spherical, about 3 mm (0.12 in) in diameter and dark brown with a large, cream aril curving half-way around the seed.

== Taxonomy ==
Acacia adinophylla was first formally described in 1999 by Bruce Maslin in the journal Nuytsia from specimens collected in the Helena and Aurora Range by Andrew Phillip Brown in 1984. The specific epithet (adinophylla) means "crowded leaved".

== Distribution and habitat ==
This species is known from populations near the type location in the Coolgardie and Mallee bioregions of south-western Western Australia, where it grows in well-drained rocky soil in mallee shrubland with low scrub.

== Conservation status ==
Acacia adinophylla is classified as "Priority One" by the Government of Western Australia Department of Parks and Wildlife, meaning that it is known from only one or a few locations which are potentially at risk.

== See also ==
- List of Acacia species
