= Helena and Aurora Ranges National Park =

National park in Western Australia

- Interactive map of Helena and Aurora Ranges National Park
- Type: National park
- Location: Goldfields–Esperance and Wheatbelt regions
- Coordinates: 30°05′04″S 119°44′31″E
- Area: Initial: 149,157 hectares (368,570 acres) Final: 333,127 hectares (823,170 acres)
- Administrator: Department of Biodiversity, Conservation and Attractions

Helena and Aurora Ranges National Park, located in the Helena and Aurora Range, is a proposed national park in the Goldfields–Esperance and Wheatbelt regions of Western Australia, 440 km (270 mi) east of Perth. The proposed national park, with an initial size of 149,157 hectares (368,570 acres), subsequently extended to 333,127 hectares (823,170 acres), is located in the Shires of Menzies and Yilgarn and is part of the Coolgardie bioregion.

Completion of stage one of the process of creating the national park was announced in February 2021. Stage one involved the upgrade of the existing Mount Manning Range Nature Reserve to a national park. The subsequent stage requires Mount Manning Conservation Park to be converted to a national park which, in turn, requires the development of an Indigenous Land Use Agreement with the Marlinyu Ghoorlie native title claim over the area.

The proposed Helena and Aurora Ranges National Park, located within the Great Western Woodlands, which is regarded as the largest remaining area of intact Mediterranean-climate woodland, contains about 3,000 species of flowering plants, amounting to a fifth of all known flora in Australia.
