= Solio Lodge =

Solio Lodge is a safari lodge owned by The Safari Collection, located in the Solio Game Reserve, a privately owned wildlife conservancy located in Central Province, Kenya. Solio Lodge is the only safari lodge in the 18,000-acre game reserve home to over 200 herd of rhinos, one of the largest in Africa. The lodge is located in the valley between Aberdare Mountains and Mount Kenya.

The lodge's general area is characterized by mild temperature and periodic rain with mixtures of acacia woodland, grass plains and water bodies. Rhinos and other wildlife species are frequently sighted in numbers grazing around Solio Lodge all year round.

The lodge supports wildlife conservation and the local community by funding primary schools, free medical clinics and employment of local inhabitants.
