= Leucopogon spectabilis =

Conservation status
- Declared rare (DEC)

Scientific classification
- Kingdom: Plantae
- Clade: Tracheophytes
- Clade: Angiosperms
- Clade: Eudicots
- Clade: Asterids
- Order: Ericales
- Family: Ericaceae
- Genus: Leucopogon
- Species: L. spectabilis

Binomial name
- Leucopogon spectabilis Hislop & A.R.Chapm.
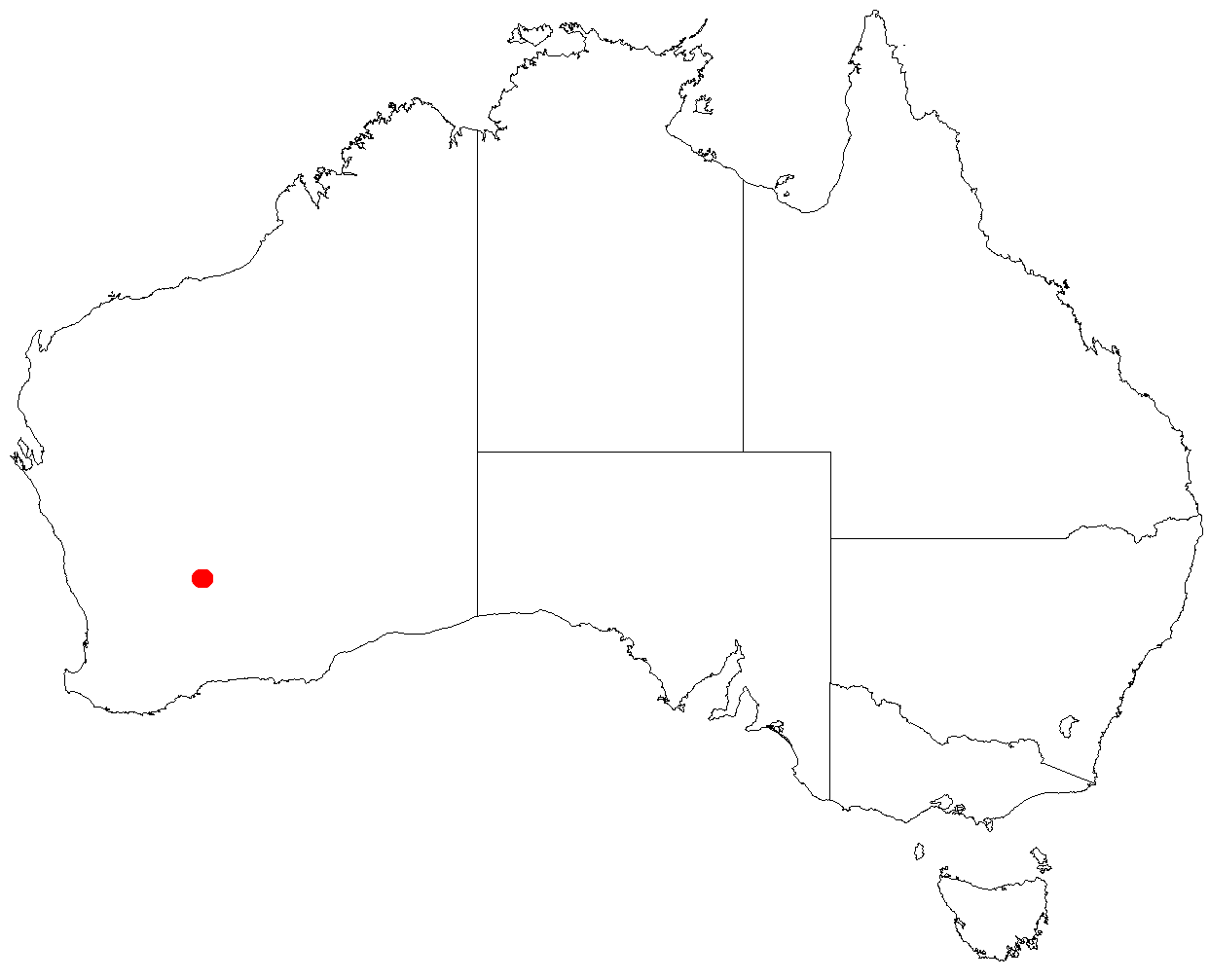
- Occurrence data from AVH

Species of plant

Leucopogon spectabilis is a species of flowering plant in the heath family Ericaceae and is endemic to inland Western Australia. It is a narrow, erect shrub with few glabrous branchlets, narrowly elliptic leaves and relatively large white flowers arranged in 14 to 32 upper leaf axils.

== Description ==
Leucopogon spectabilis is a narrow, erect shrub that typically grows to a height of about 100 cm (39 in) and has only a few, glabrous branches. The leaves are spirally arranged, upwards-pointing, narrowly elliptic, 15–25 mm (0.59–0.98 in) long and 2.9–5.2 mm (0.11–0.20 in) wide on a petiole 1.5–2.0 mm (0.059–0.079 in) long. Both surfaces of the leaves are glabrous, the upper surface slightly shiny and dark green. The flowers are arranged singly in 14 to 32 upper leaf axils along 25–65 mm (0.98–2.56 in) near the ends of branchlets, with triangular or egg-shaped bracts 0.7–1.3 mm (0.028–0.051 in) long and slightly longer bracteoles. The sepals are egg-shaped, 2.5–3.3 mm (0.098–0.130 in) long and greenish. The petals are white and joined at the base to form a broadly bell-shaped tube 1.5–2.0 mm (0.059–0.079 in) long, 1.8–2.6 mm (0.071–0.102 in) wide, the lobes 3.1–4.4 mm (0.12–0.17 in) long and densely bearded inside. Flowering mainly occurs from August to October, partly depending on rainfall.

== Taxonomy and naming ==
Leucopogon spectabilis was first formally described in 2007 by Michael Clyde Hislop and Alex R. Chapman in the journal Nuytsia from specimens collected by Brendan Lepschi in the Helena and Aurora Range in 1995. The specific epithet (spectabilis) means "remarkable" or "spectacular", referring to the relatively large flowers and long flower spikes.

== Distribution and habitat ==
This leucopogon is only known from the Helena and Aurora Range in the Coolgardie bioregion of inland Western Australia, where it grows in rock crevices in open shrubland on ironstone ranges.

== Conservation status ==
Leucopogon spectabilis is listed as "Threatened" by the Western Australian Government Department of Biodiversity, Conservation and Attractions, meaning that it is in danger of extinction.
