= Edna May Gold Mine =

Gold mine in Western Australia

Edna May
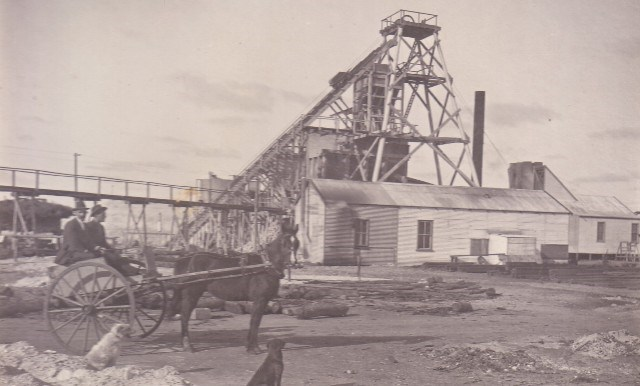
- An early photo of the mine

- Location in Western Australia
- Interactive map of Edna May
- Location: Westonia, Western Australia, Australia; 31°17′06″S 118°41′42″E
- Production: 113,053 troy ounces
- Financial year: 2022–23
- Opened: 2010
- Company: Ramelius Resources
- Website: www.rameliusresources.com.au
- Acquired: 2017

The Edna May Gold Mine is a gold mine located at Westonia, Western Australia.

It is operated by Ramelius Resources. The mine, planned to be in full production by the end of July 2010, is scheduled to produce in excess of 100,000 ounces of gold per annum. Historically, the Westonia region has produced 600,000 ounces of gold between 1911 and 1991.

== History ==
Mining at Westonia has been carried out on three separate occasions since 1911. From 1911 to 1922, an underground operation produced 320,000 ounces of gold. In a second phase, from 1935 to 1947, 40,000 ounces were produced, again from an underground operation. The third phase, now as an open cut, run from 1986 to 1991 and produced 274,000 ounces of gold.

The Edna May project was acquired by Catalpa in July 1993, when it was purchased from ACM Gold Pty Ltd. Catalpa, then as "Westonia Mines Limited", was first listed on the Australian Securities Exchange, the ASX, on 20 August 2002. It changed its name to Catalpa Resources Limited on 3 September 2008. The company was renamed after the ship Catalpa, which rescued Fenian convicts of the coast of Rockingham in 1876.

Catalpa purchased the processing facility of the former Big Bell Gold Mine and relocated it to its site near Westonia in 2007 for a cost of A$5.2 million. It began refurbishing and constructing the plant in March 2009, aiming for a production start in mid-2010 and an annual production in excess of 100,000 ounces of gold. Construction cost of the mining project was estimated to be A$92 million. The company announced its first gold pour at the mine on 29 April 2010. Unlike many other mining projects in Western Australia, which utilise a fly-in fly-out workforce, Catalpa hoped to initially recruit up to 30% of its workers from local communities and planned to eventually increase this number to 50%, which it had achieved by the time of its opening in August 2010.

Catalpa commenced a three-month ramp-up phase at the mine in May 2010, with full production scheduled to be achieved by 31 July 2010.

The mine was officially opened on 1 August 2010 by Western Australian Premier Colin Barnett and Petroleum Minister Norman Moore. It is expected that the mine will be in operation for at least nine years and produce 100,000 ounces of gold per annum.

In September 2017, Ramelius Resources acquired the mine from Evolution Mining for A$90 million, A$40 million of this as an up-front payment. Evolution Mining itself had been formed in the 2015 A$1.2 billion merger of Catalpa Resources and Conquest Mining.

Apart from surface and underground mining at Edna May, ore was also carted to the mine's processing plant from the Marda mine surface operations to the north during the 2020–21 financial year. Additionally, transport of ore from the Tampia mine to the south of Edna May for processing commenced in July 2021.

== Production ==
Annual production of the mine:

Year	Production	Grade	Cost per ounce
2010–11			
2011–12			
2012–13			
2013–14			
2014–15			
2015–16			
2016–17			
2017–18	72,521 ounces	1.20 g/t	
2018–19	81,839 ounces	0.94 g/t	
2019–20	63,297 ounces	0.99 g/t	
2020–21	110,950 ounces	1.13 g/t	
2021–22	133,089 ounces	1.76 g/t	
2022–23	113,053 ounces	1.94 g/t	
