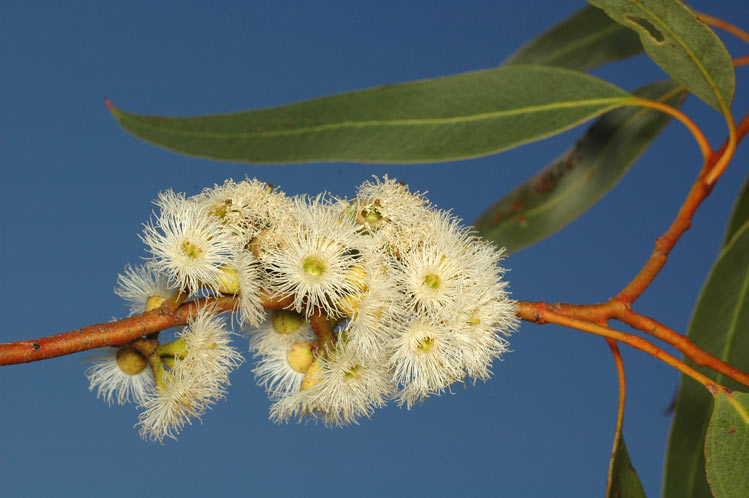
- Eucalyptus petraea flowers

Scientific classification
- Kingdom: Plantae
- Clade: Embryophytes
- Clade: Tracheophytes
- Clade: Angiosperms
- Clade: Eudicots
- Clade: Rosids
- Order: Myrtales
- Family: Myrtaceae
- Genus: Eucalyptus
- Species: E. petraea

Binomial name
- Eucalyptus petraea D.J.Carr & S.G.M.Carr

= Eucalyptus petraea =

Granite rock box

Species of eucalyptus

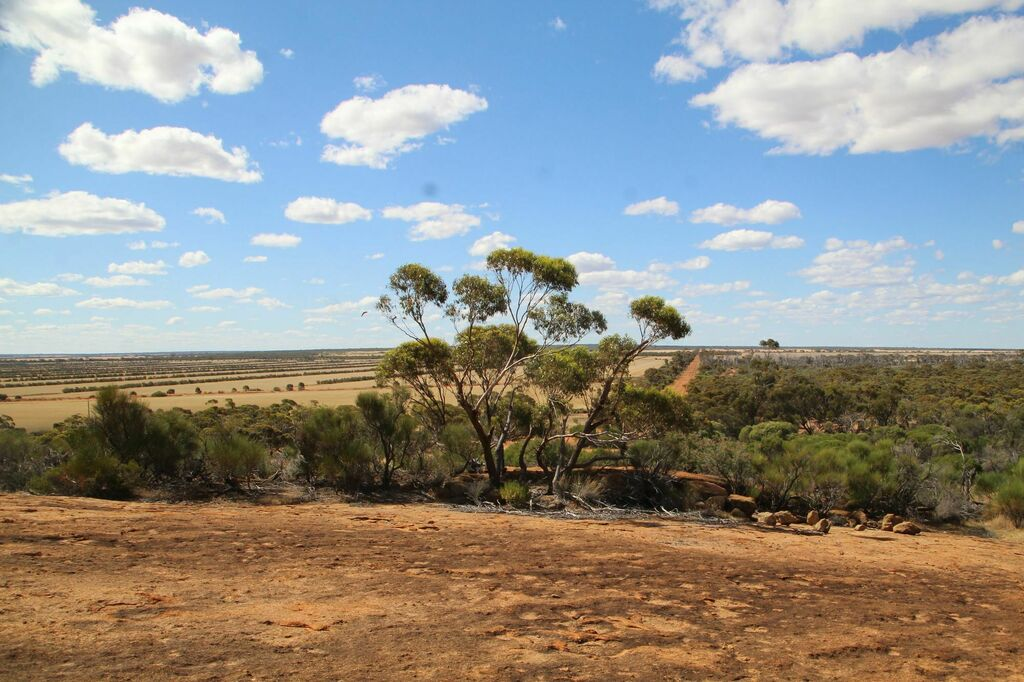
Habit near Elachbutting Rock

Eucalyptus petraea, commonly known as granite rock box, is a species of mallee or a small tree that is endemic to Western Australia. It has thin, ribbony or flaky to fibrous bark on the lower trunk, smooth greyish above, lance-shaped adult leaves, flower buds usually in groups of seven, creamy white flowers and conical fruit.

== Description ==
Eucalyptus petraea is a mallee or small tree that typically grows to a height of 5 m (16 ft) and forms a lignotuber. It has thin, ribbony to flaky or fibrous bark on the lowest 1–2 m (3 ft 3 in – 6 ft 7 in) of the trunk, smooth greyish bark above. Young plants and coppice regrowth have lance-shaped leaves that are 65–90 mm (2.6–3.5 in) long and 20–35 mm (0.79–1.38 in) wide. Adult leaves are the same shade of glossy green on both sides, lance-shaped, 80–145 mm (3.1–5.7 in) long and 15–35 mm (0.59–1.38 in) wide, tapering to a petiole 15–35 mm (0.59–1.38 in) long. The flower buds are arranged on the ends of branchlets in groups of seven on a branched peduncle 7–22 mm (0.28–0.87 in) long, the individual buds on pedicels 3–7 mm (0.12–0.28 in) long. Mature buds are oval, 6–9 mm (0.24–0.35 in) long and 4–7 mm (0.16–0.28 in) wide with a blunt, conical operculum. Flowering occurs from January to February and from August to September and the flowers are creamy white. The fruit is a woody, conical capsule 4–10 mm (0.16–0.39 in) long and 5–10 mm (0.20–0.39 in) wide with the valves below rim level.

== Taxonomy and naming ==
Eucalyptus petraea was first formally described in 1983 by Denis and Stella Carr in the journal Nuytsia from material they collected near Gnarlbine Rock in 1980. The specific epithet (petraea) is from the Latin word petraueus meaning "growing among rocks".

== Distribution and habitat ==
Granite rock box grows in isolated locations near granite boulders between Coorow, Merredin and Karonie, east of Kalgoorlie.

== See also ==
- List of Eucalyptus species
