= Ngadju Indigenous Protected Area =

Protected area in Western Australia, Australia

- IUCN category VI (protected area with sustainable use of natural resources)
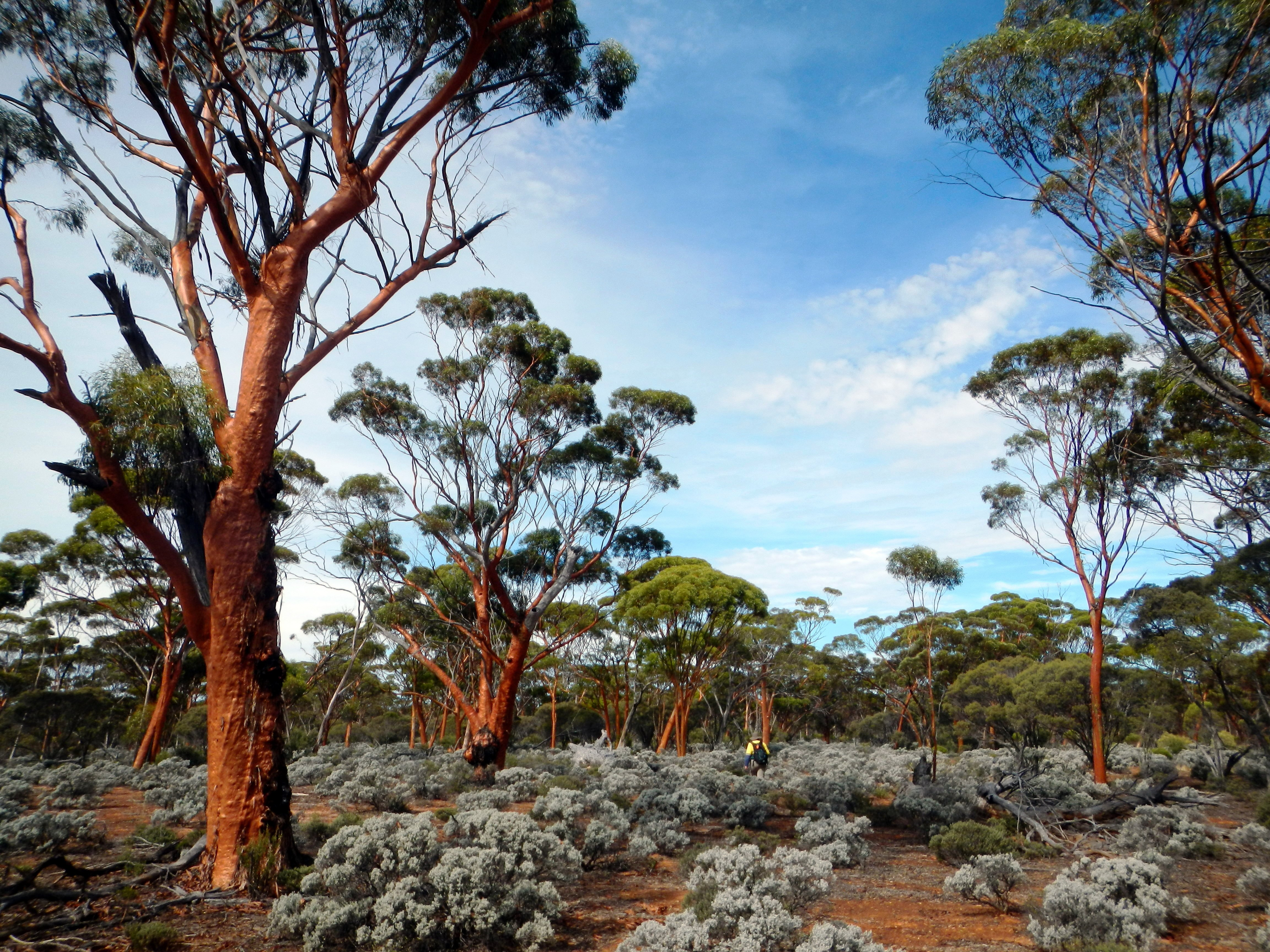
- Eucalyptus woodland in Ngadju Indigenous Protected Area

- Location within Western Australia
- Nearest city: Norseman, Western Australia
- Coordinates: 32°18′S 122°24′E
- Area: 43,993.01 km^{2} (16,985.80 sq mi)
- Designation: Indigenous Protected Area
- Designated: 2020
- Operator: Ngadju Traditional Custodians

Ngadju Indigenous Protected Area is an Indigenous Protected Area in Western Australia. It covers an area of 43.993.01 km^{2} in the Goldfields-Esperance region.

The protected area was established in 2020. The Ngadju people serve as traditional custodians of the land.

== Geography ==
The reserve covers an area of 43993.01 km^{2}, which consists of several separate blocks of land. The southeastern portion is bounded by Cape Arid National Park to the south and Nuytsland Nature Reserve to the south and southeast. Ngadju Indigenous Protected Area bounds Dundas Nature Reserve on the south, east, northwest, and northeast. The eastern portion of the protected area adjoins Frank Hann and Peak Charles national parks.

== Flora and fauna ==
The protected area covers an extensive area where the Mediterranean-climate forests, woodlands and shrublands of Southwest Australia transition to the arid deserts of the Australian interior. It includes one quarter of the Great Western Woodlands, considered the largest remaining intact Mediterranean-climate woodland on Earth. The protected area is home to 21 vertebrate and 166 plant species listed as threatened or priority species at state or national level.

== History and conservation ==
In 2014 and 2017 the Federal Court recognised Ngadju traditional ownership of over 102,000 square kilometres, after a long legal proceeding which began in 1995. The land includes exclusive native title over approximately 45,000 square kilometres, east and west of the town of Norseman. In 2020 the Ngadju Indigenous Protected Area was dedicated on the Ngadju land.

The Ngadju Rangers combine traditional land management and contemporary science to conserve biodiversity, manage fire, weeds, and feral animals, and protect cultural sites within the protected area.
