= Great Western Woodlands =

Ecoregion in Western Australia

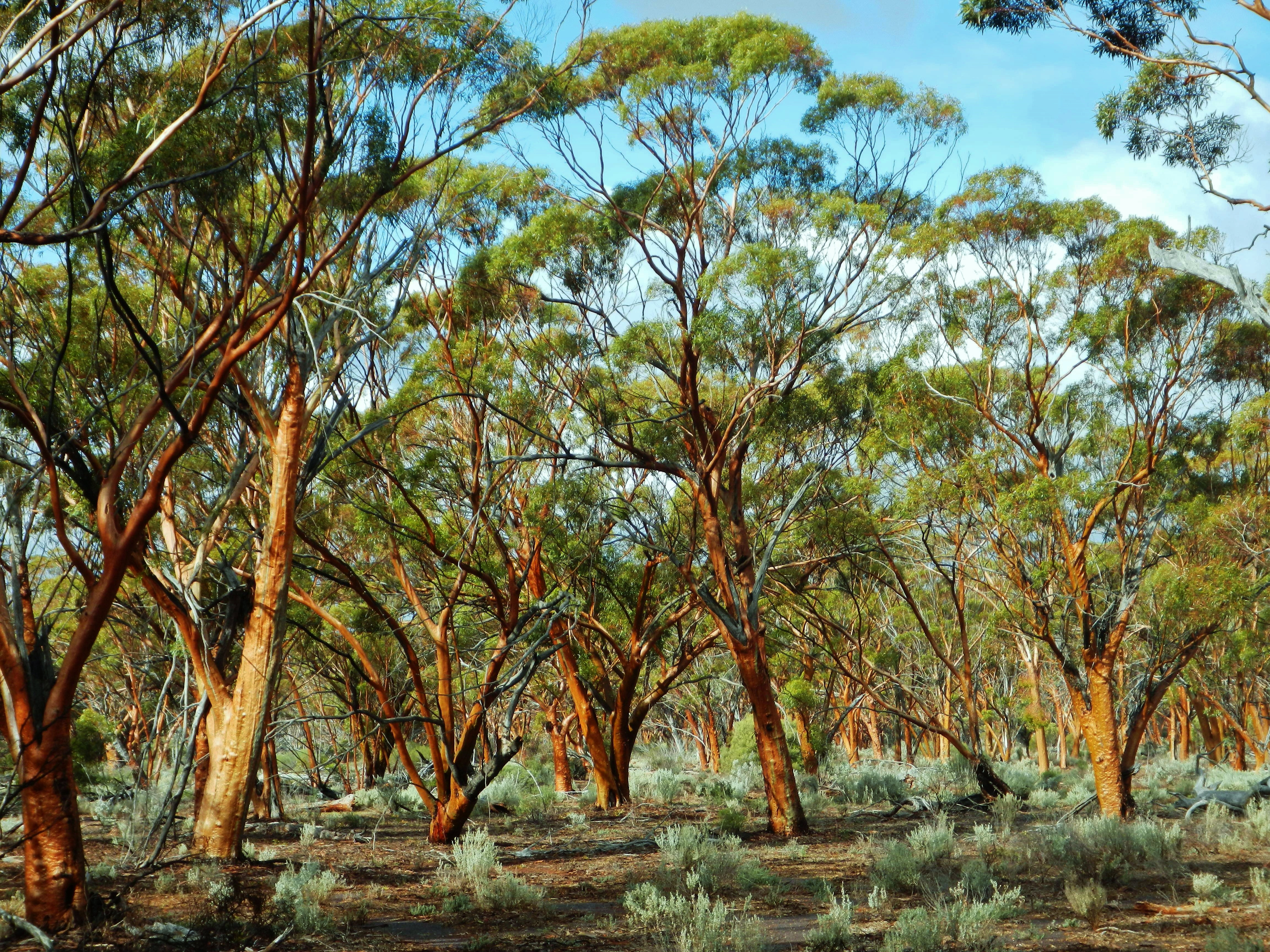
- The Great Western Woodlands

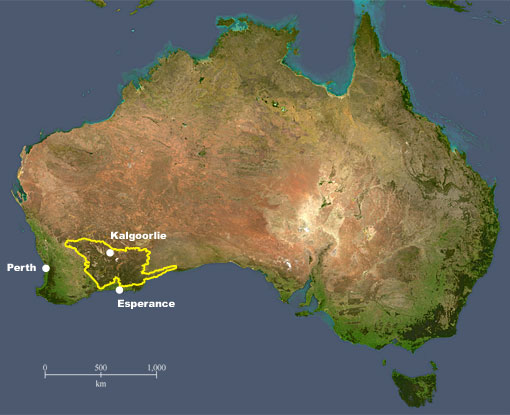
- Location within Australia

Ecology
- Biome: Temperate woodland

Geography
- Area: 160,000 km^{2} (62,000 mi^{2})
- Country: Australia
- Climate type: Predominantly semi-arid Mediterranean (southern fringe)

The Great Western Woodlands is located in the southwest of Australia. The woodlands cover almost 16,000,000 hectares (40,000,000 acres), a region larger in size than England and Wales combined. The boundary of the Great Western Woodlands runs from the Nullarbor Plain in the east to the Western Australian Wheatbelt in the west; from north of Esperance through to the inland mulga country and deserts that are found north of Kalgoorlie.

Researchers from the Australian National University, working with The Wilderness Society, established the region's boundaries based on satellite data of its natural ecosystems and vegetation types. The Great Western Woodlands' vegetation is botanically diverse, consisting of mature eucalypt woodlands dominating the landscape, interspersed with large areas of mallee, Shrublands and grasslands.

The Great Western Woodlands region is one of the world's "global biodiversity hotspots", the South West Western Australia Floristic Province, with new flora and fauna species still being discovered. Current research shows there are close to 3,500 plant species found in the Great Western Woodlands region; as many as half of these species are endemic to Southwest Australia. The region is also home to at least 49 species of mammals, 14 species of frogs, 138 species of reptiles and 215 species of birds.

The natural values of the Great Western Woodlands make the area a place of continental and global significance. Beyond this region's high rates of biodiversity, scientists have also established that the Great Western Woodlands region contains 950 million tonnes of carbon stored in the vegetation and soil.

The Great Western Woodlands is vulnerable to a number of threats including fire, feral animals, noxious weeds and fragmentation caused by ad hoc development.

== History ==
=== Pre-European history and native title ===
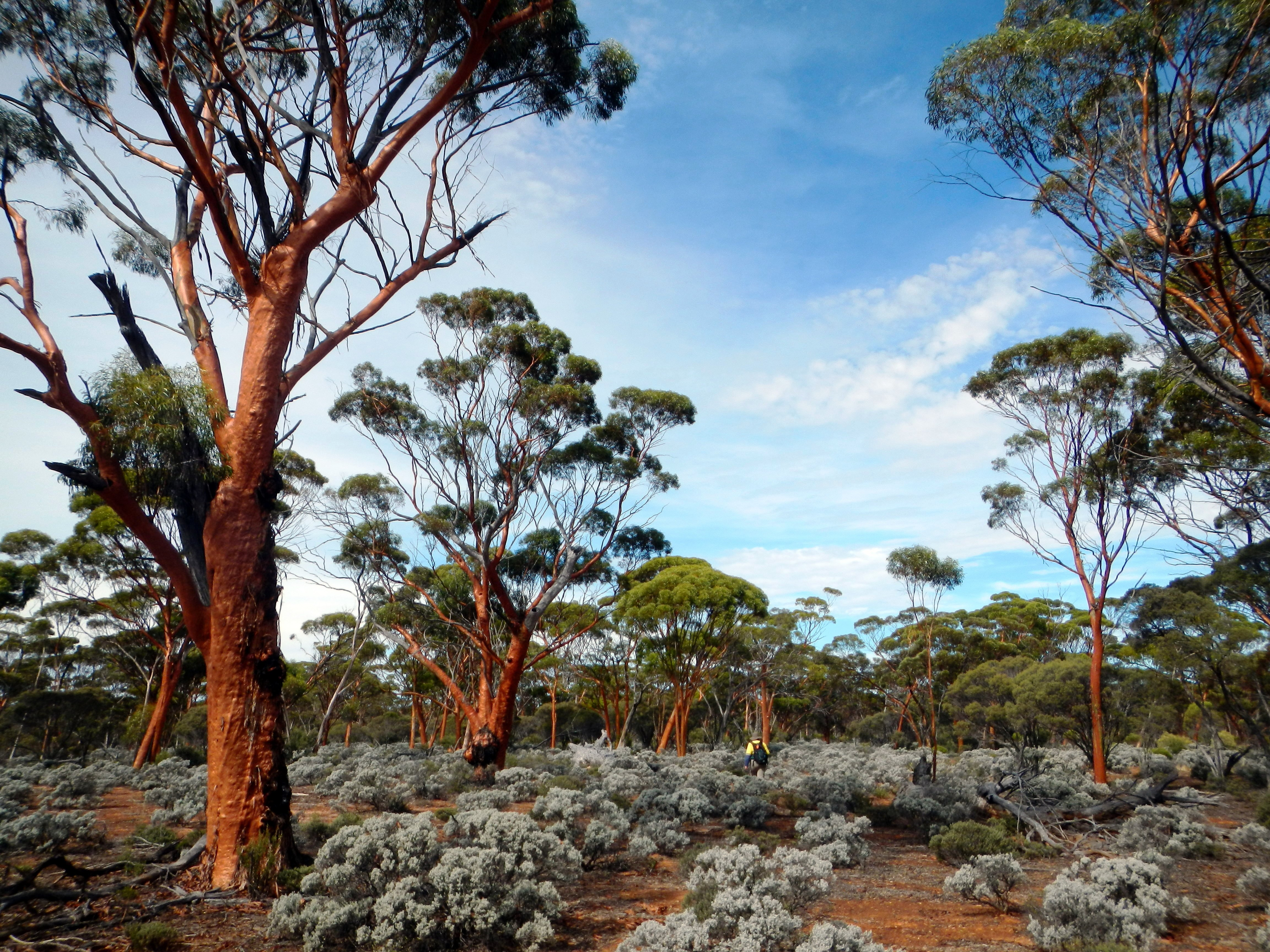
The Great Western Woodlands

Archaeological evidence shows that Aboriginal people have had a direct and continuous role in the maintenance and use of locations in the Great Western Woodlands region for at least 22,000 years.

There are around ten distinct Aboriginal language groups whose lands lie within or include parts of the Great Western Woodlands.

Land use by the Aboriginal people over so many years has directly influenced the characteristics of the environment that are observed today. These include, for example, the changes resulting from implementing different fire regimes across the landscape and specialised hunting practices. Aboriginal survival in this region required an intimate understanding of the landscape and the biota that lived within it. As an essential part of their life, the Aboriginal people of this region also constructed and maintained deep wells in order to access water.

Today, Indigenous communities with strong cultural and legal ties to country are located in many centres in the Great Western Woodlands. There are several native titles and land rights claims covering more than 95% of the landscape of the Great Western Woodlands area.

Since 2014, two major Indigenous native title claims covering parts of the woodlands have been determined in favour of the traditional owners – the Ngadju and Esperance Nyungar claims.

=== Geological history ===
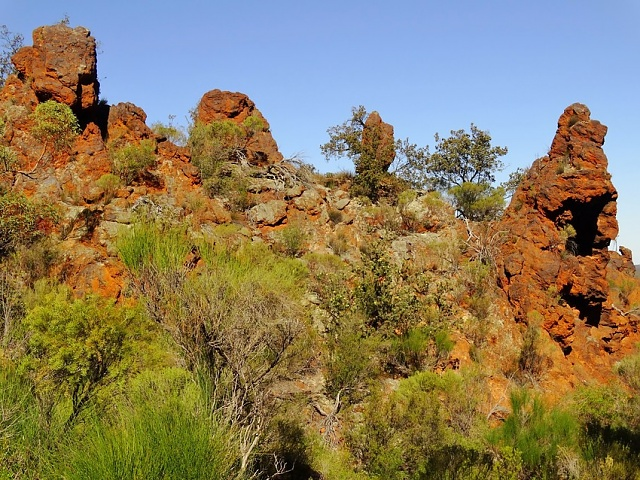
Banded Iron Formation of the Yilgarn craton

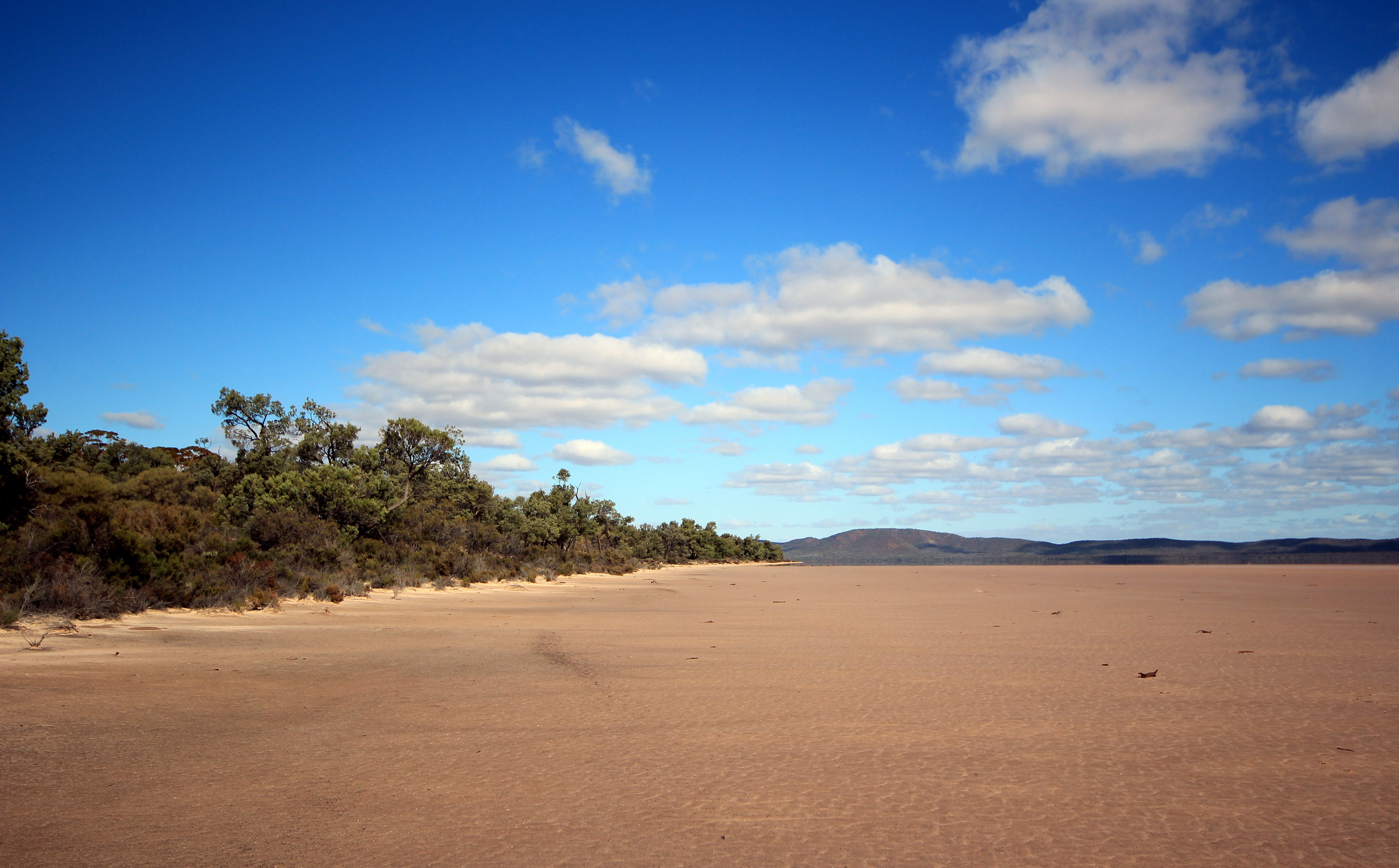
Salt Lake, Great Western Woodlands

The majority of the Great Western Woodlands sits atop the stable geological formation known as the Yilgarn craton, formed between 2,400 and 3,700 million years ago. This formation contains some of the oldest mineral deposits ever recorded on the Earth's surface. The region also has a series of geological intrusions running parallel to the Earth's surface, known as the greenstone belts. These formations house large quantities of gold and nickel, and also provide very rich and mineralised soils, which have led in part to the evolution of locally distinctive flora.

A major geological event in the history of the Great Western Woodlands was a period of glaciation that occurred between 250 and 330 million years ago. During this time, a massive ice-sheet covered most of Australia, flattening much of the landscape. Since then, the Great Western Woodlands region has remained undisturbed by glaciation, and the remaining granite outcrops are now significant landmarks.

Salt lakes are found throughout the Great Western Woodlands. These are remnants of ancient drainage systems (such as rivers) from about 65 million years ago, and are valuable habitats supporting a variety of vertebrates and invertebrates.

=== Conservation and science involvement ===
The name Great Western Woodlands was given to the region in 2004 by scientists from the Australian National University working with conservation groups. The name is intended to reflect the significant scale of the region, its western location, and its main ecological character. An appropriate Indigenous name is still being sought.

Since 2004, The Wilderness Society has worked with a wide range of organisations and local groups to increase public awareness of the scale and ecological value of the woodlands, the threats to its value, and options for improved protection and management.

Since 2005, other non-government environmental organisations and science organisations have become involved. They include Gondwana Link Inc, The Nature Conservancy and Pew Environmental Group, BirdLife Australia and CSIRO.

== Characteristics ==
=== Boundary ===
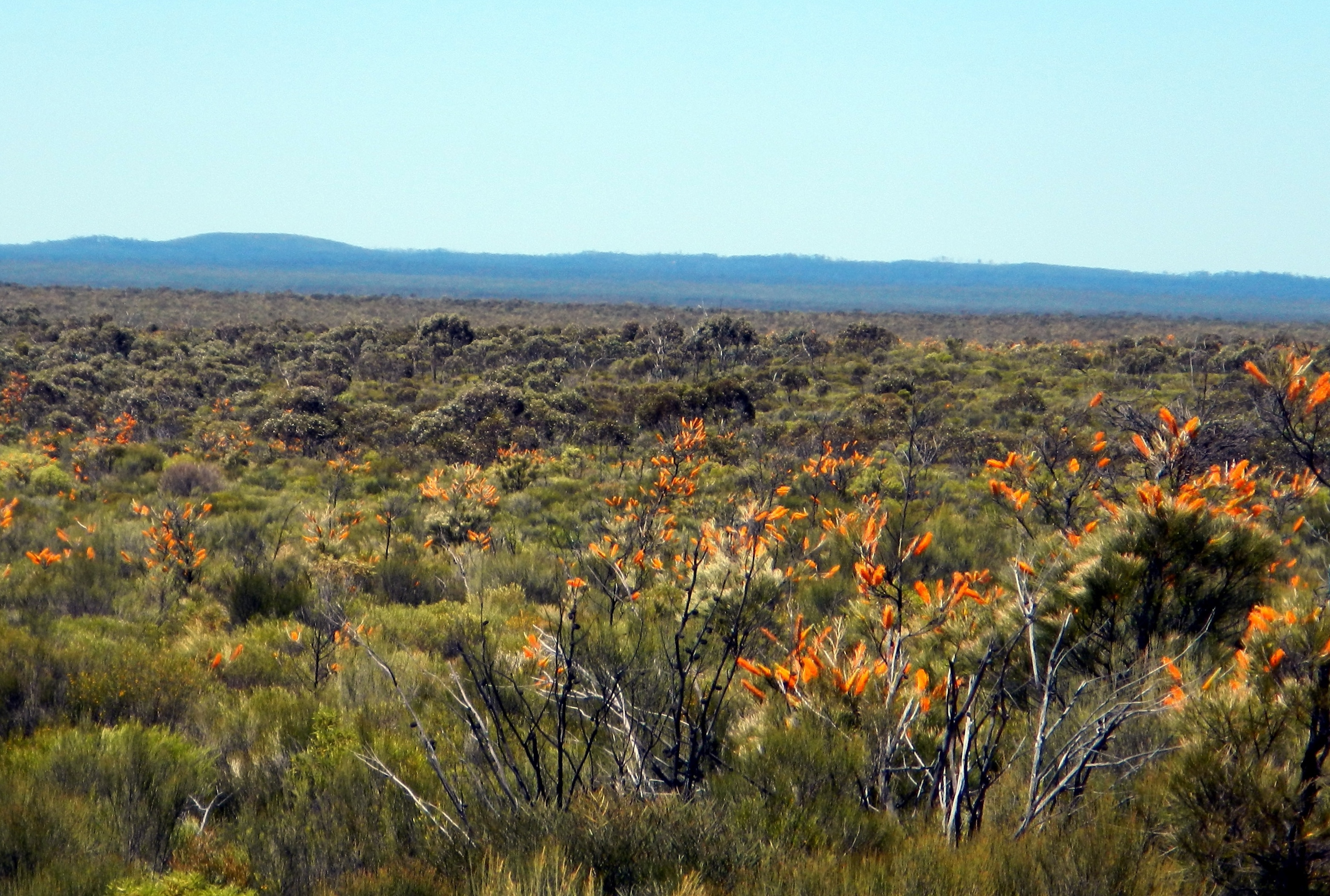
The Helena and Aurora Range, part of the Great Western Woodlands region

The Great Western Woodlands covers close to 16,000,000 hectares (40,000,000 acres), an area larger than England and Wales combined. Prior to 2006, the northern part of the region was often known locally as the Goldfields, with many local names used in the southern part.

Researchers at the Australian National University mapped the Great Western Woodlands boundary using satellite-derived Modis data. The boundary separates the eucalypt woodlands from the Acacia aneura complex dominated country to the north, the treeless Nullarbor Plain to the east, the higher rainfall coastal heath to the south east, and agricultural land to the west and south.

=== Land tenure ===
The dominant land tenure in the Great Western Woodlands is Unallocated Crown Land (UCL), which makes up 60% of the area. UCL is the lowest category of land classification under Western Australian state law – sometimes called "orphan country". Pastoral leases cover 20 % of the area. Conservation reserves of various types represent about 15% of the region, with Class A conservation protection over 3.6% of the land, Class B on 4.5% and Class C on 4.5%. Class B and C reserves have relatively little security of tenure, while Class A reserves require parliamentary approval for any tenure changes. The remaining land in the Great Western Woodlands is divided between shire reserves, Crown reserves and freehold land.

=== Biodiversity ===
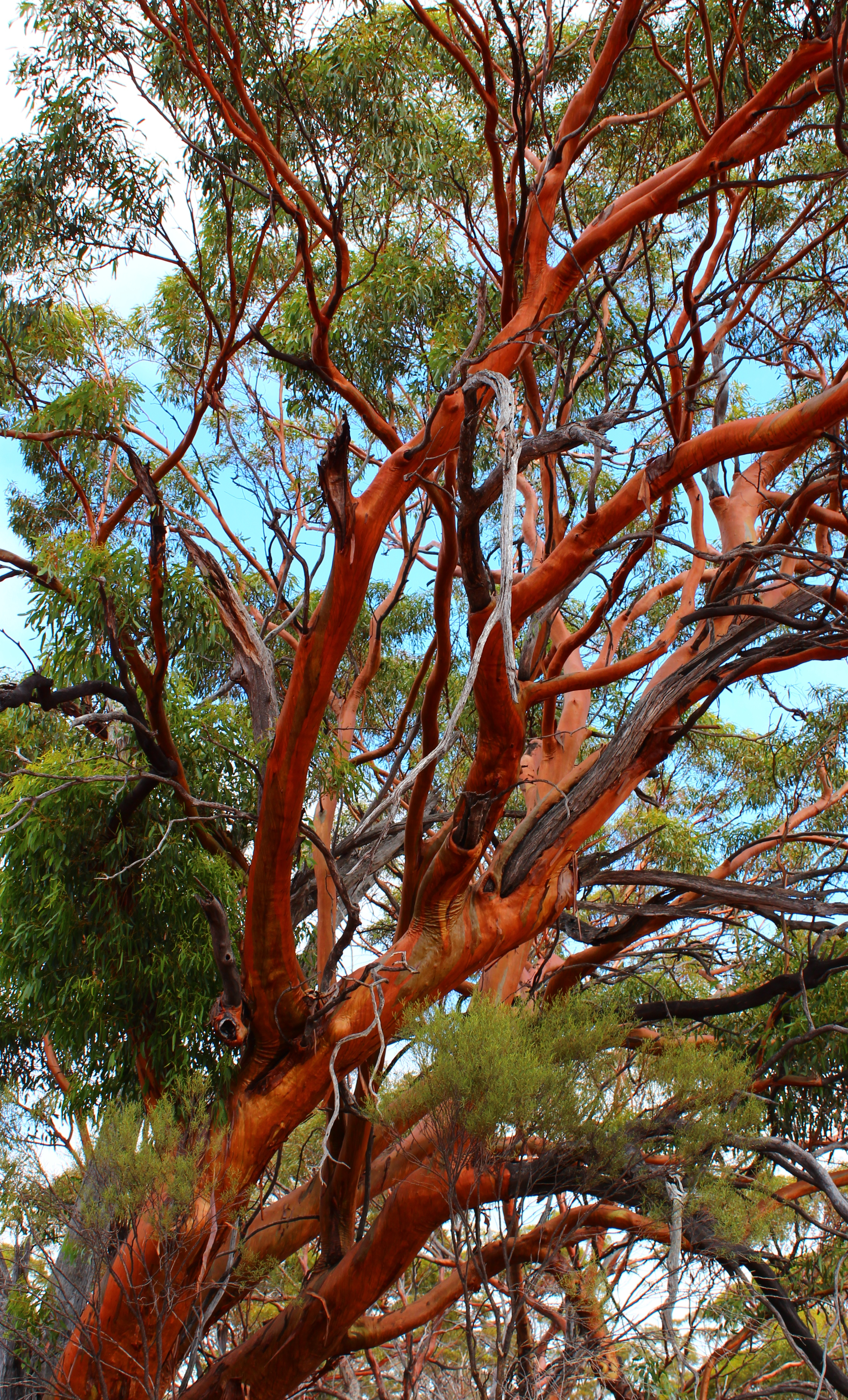
Eucalyptus salubris or Gimlet gum, growing in the Great Western Woodlands

More than 20% of Australia's flowering plant species and 30% of Australia's eucalyptus species are found within the Great Western Woodlands, making it a highly significant bioregion at a national and international level. Understanding of the Great Western Woodlands' biodiversity is still expanding through ongoing scientific work. The Great Western Woodlands account for a significant component of the plant diversity found in the Australia's South West Global Biodiversity Hotspot. One of the main reasons why the Great Western Woodlands is biologically rich is its position within the path of significant environmental gradients. It is located in the "interzone" between Australia's moist, cooler south-west corner and its desert interior. This means the region has elements of both these climatic zones, but has also created conditions to allow for natural speciation to occur.

==== Vegetation types ====
The Great Western Woodlands region is a matrix of four broad vegetation types: woodlands, mallee, grasslands and sandplain shrublands. Woodlands are the most common type of habitat, covering more than 9,000,000 hectares (22,000,000 acres). Woodlands are defined as treed habitats that contain less than 30% canopy cover (in contrast, "forests" are defined as having greater than 30% canopy cover). Woodlands therefore resemble forests with greater distances between the trees, and more open canopies. Likewise, the understorey in woodlands is often very spacious compared to that of forests.

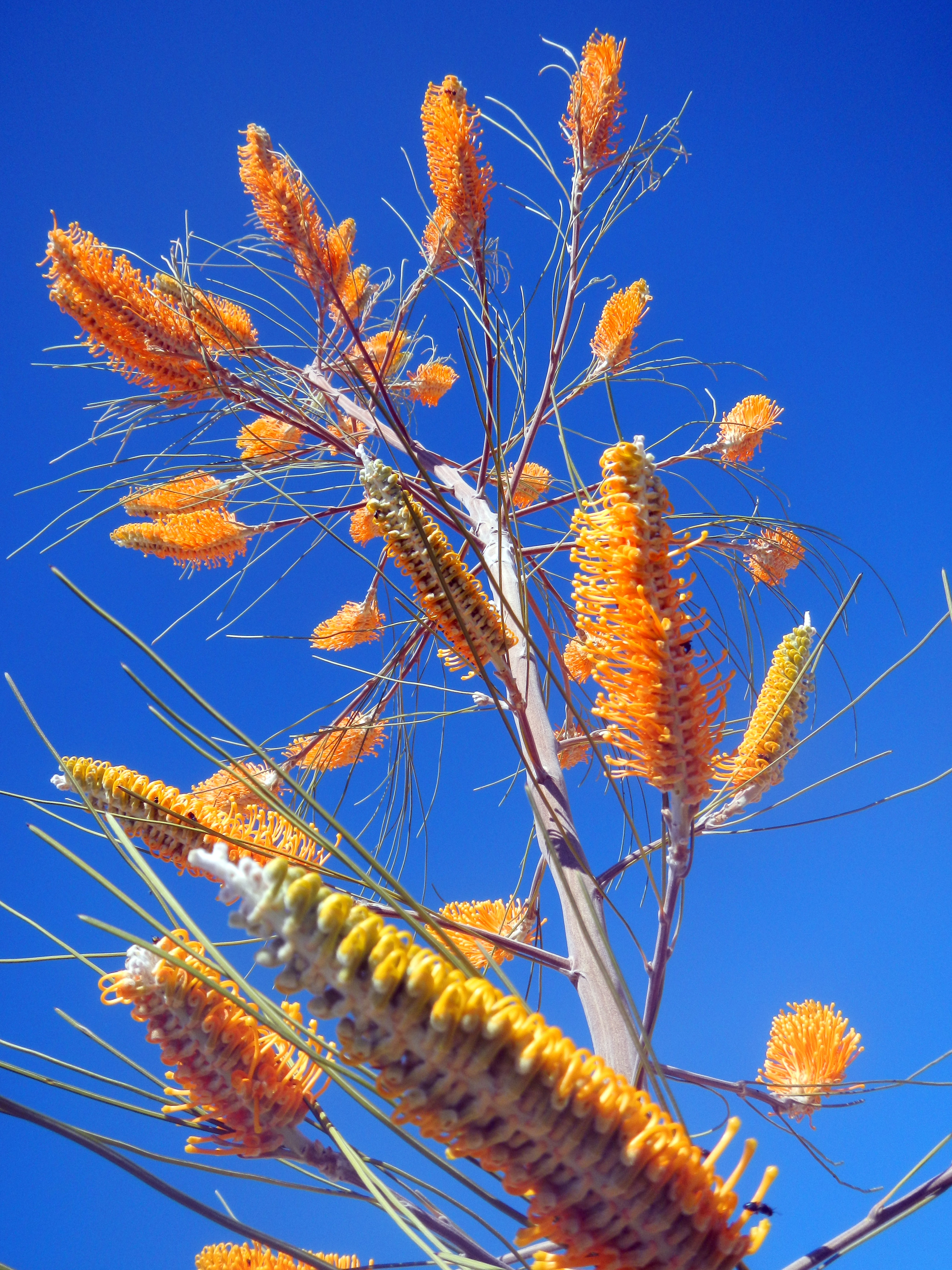
Grevillea excelsior or flame grevillea, flowering in the Great Western Woodlands

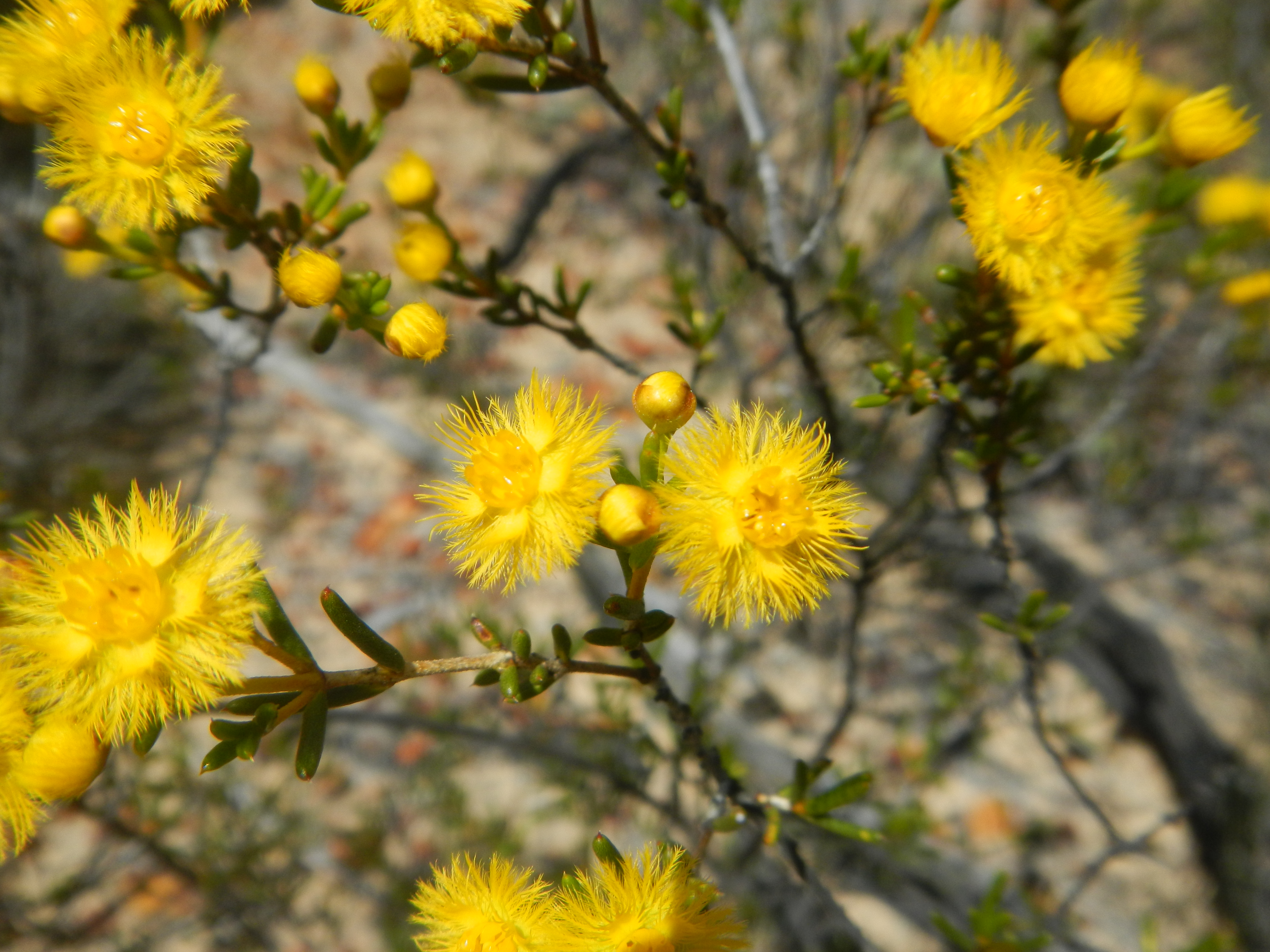
Verticordia

==== Flora ====
According to the Herbarium of Western Australia's records, there are 3,314 flowering plant species from 119 families and over 4,200 taxa (including undescribed species, subspecies, hybrids and varieties) recorded so far for the Great Western Woodlands. It is estimated that almost half of these species are endemic to the south west of Australia. This diversity can be attributed in part to the wide range of habitats throughout the region, from heavy soil valley floors, to sandplain, salt lakes, granite hills, banded ironstone hills, greenstone belt mosaics and many others. Each of these environments provides the conditions for unique types of flora. The amount of plant diversity in the Great Western Woodlands is comparable to the plant diversity in Canada, a country more than 60 times the size of this region.

==== Fauna ====
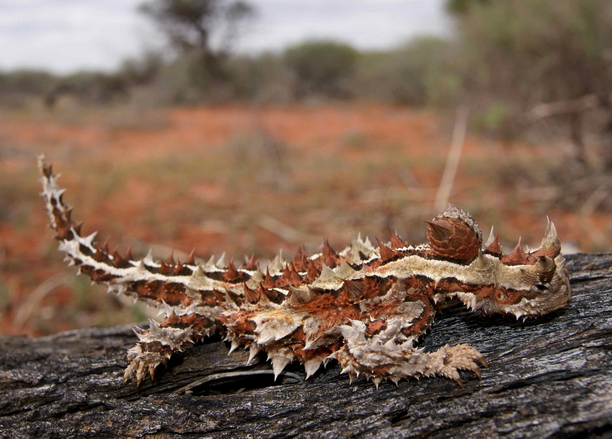
A Thorny Devil in the Great Western Woodlands

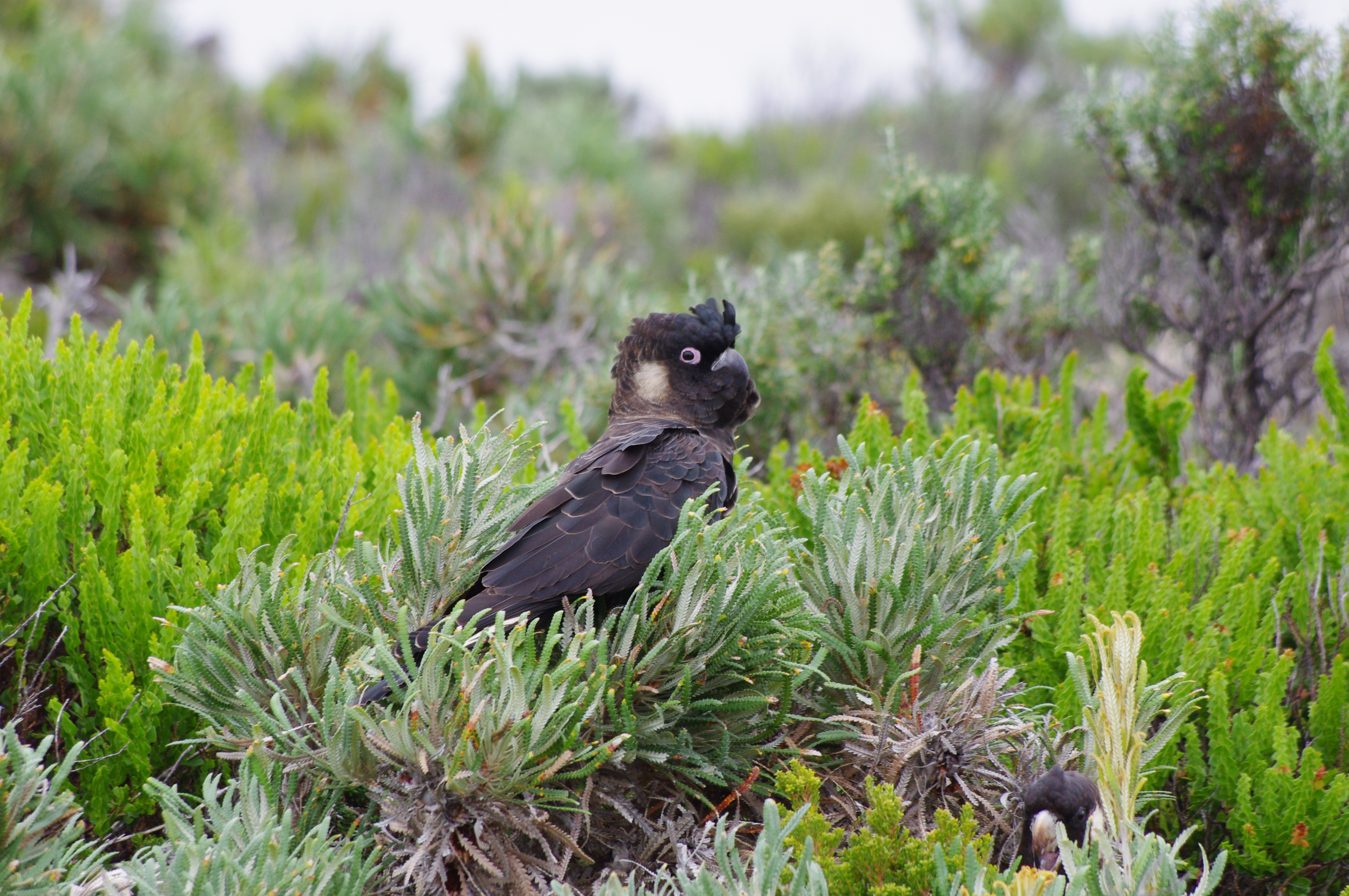
Carnaby's black cockatoo, endemic to south-western Australia

The Western Australian Museum and BirdLife Australia have recorded that within the Great Western Woodlands there are 49 species of mammals, 14 species of frogs, 138 species of reptiles, and 215 species of birds. As more biological surveys are done in the area it is expected that these numbers will grow. The region's high number of reptiles stands out as exceptional compared to other reptile communities around the world.

Some of the mammals found in the Great Western Woodlands region include the greater long-eared bat (Nyctophilus timoriensis), western brush wallaby (Macropus irma), red-tailed phascogale (Phascogale calura), and the western quoll or chuditch (Dasyurus geoffroii).

Reptiles found in the region include the carpet python (Morelia spilota imbricata), the western bearded dragon (Pogona minor minima), and the common slender blue tongue (Cyclodomorphus branchialis).

Birds found in the region include the Australian bustard (Ardeotis australis), the bush stone-curlew (Burhinus grallarius), Carnaby's cockatoo (Calyptorhynchus latirostris), and the malleefowl (Leipoa ocellata).

==== Threatened species ====
As part of the Great Western Woodlands overall biodiversity, the region is home to a variety of threatened species. Currently there are 44 plant species in the Great Western Woodlands that are listed as "declared rare flora" by the West Australian Government. In addition to this there are 422 "priority" species of flora in the region. Species are listed as "priority" if they appear in only small or limited populations, which are threatened. Such small populations can be due to plant life having very specific environmental tolerances or to plants being adapted to rare habitats. The classification can also indicate species that are poorly known, and in need of further survey work to establish their status.

The region is also home to many fauna species that are rare and vulnerable. There are 32 threatened vertebrate species on the endangered fauna list of the Western Australian Government, which include 16 mammals, 8 birds and 8 reptiles, all of which exist or are likely to exist in the Great Western Woodlands. Furthermore, the pig-footed bandicoot, the long-tailed hopping mouse, the crescent nail-tailed wallaby and the broad-faced potoroo that were once found in the Great Western Woodlands, are now considered globally extinct.

=== Human settlements, communities and economy ===
The Great Western Woodlands has been home to numerous Aboriginal language groups for thousands of years. This long-term management of the land by Aboriginal people has influenced the characteristics of the environment.

European prospectors discovered gold in the region in the late 1800s, which triggered a mining boom throughout the area. The population around this time increased to 50,000 people located in over 50 towns. Most people living in the area around this time were employed in the mining sector or other service related industries.

Following the gold rush, population in the region declined until nickel was discovered in the region in the 1960s, triggering another period of rapid growth due to mineral resources. Today it is estimated that the population has returned to 50,000 people living in the major towns including Kalgoorlie, Coolgardie, Norseman, and Southern Cross. While mining and mineral exploration have remained the major economy drivers in the region, tourism, especially nature-based tourism, is growing and it is beginning to add significantly to local economies.

Recent studies have indicated that, with adequate conservation and promotion, the Great Western Woodlands could play a significant role in regional economic diversification.

== Key ecological processes and threats ==
=== Climate change ===
Natural climate change has played a role over time to influence species evolution and distribution around Australia, including in the Great Western Woodlands. Post-industrial humans have contributed to climate change through increased carbon dioxide emissions and deforestation. Human-induced climate change is occurring rapidly and it is affecting the ecosystems and species of the Great Western Woodlands. Scientists estimate that this region will be exposed to more frequent extreme weather events, as a result of climate change.

=== Excessive fire ===
Fire significantly affects the landscapes and biodiversity of the Great Western Woodlands.

Humans have played a role in managing fire for thousands of years in the Great Western Woodlands. Although there is very little published information that describes how Aboriginal people used fire in this region historically, these fire regimes are believed to have changed significantly since the 19th century. Evidence published in 2006 that uses natural clues for past fire regimes (for example, the distribution and age of long-lived, fire-sensitive plants such as Callitris Pine) suggest that woodland habitats were disturbed by fire on average every 400 years, whereas shrubland habitats burnt as frequently as every 60 years.

Nowadays, there is concern that the region is being excessively affected by large wildfires. For example, it is estimated that 4,500,000 hectares (11,000,000 acres) have been burnt in the last 36 years, 2,500,000 hectares (6,000,000 acres) of this in the last seven years. In recent times, most of the fires in the Great Western Woodlands are believed to have been started by lightning, although many are unintended consequences of human activity (for example, accidental ignition, or burning to protect property).

A study conducted by the CSIRO and Ngadju traditional owners in 2013 documented Indigenous fire knowledge and use as part of a process of re-instating Indigenous fire management practices in the woodlands.

=== Feral animals ===
Introduced feral animals can seriously affect the natural ecosystems found in the Great Western Woodlands. Cats, foxes and wild dogs do this directly through predation, whereas camels, donkeys, goats and rabbits do it through foraging and grazing, competing for food and territory and spreading diseases.

Very little on-ground management of feral animals is done on unallocated crown land. There is some management of feral animals on reserves and pastoral leases, which includes baiting, trapping, shooting and fencing .

=== Weeds ===
Throughout the Great Western Woodlands there are both native and exotic species of weeds. Weeds in the Great Western Woodlands have numerous environmental effects including resource competition, prevention of seedling recruitment, alteration to hydrological cycles, changes to soil nutrients, alteration of fire regimes, changes to the abundance and distribution of indigenous fauna, and genetic changes.

There are several methods used to control weeds such as biological and/or manual control, herbicides, controlling ecosystem degradation processes that favour weeds, and fire management. Weed control strategies are commonly associated with revegetation efforts.

=== Fragmentation and cumulative impacts ===
Currently, there is no formal, integrated planning for the Great Western Woodlands as a whole. This means that development proposals that could have severe effects, both directly and cumulatively, are considered in isolation. For example, constructing infrastructure corridors (roads, powerlines, pipelines, etc.) across the woodlands can result in large scale fragmentation and consequent invasion by weeds and feral animals.

== Green carbon ==
Scientific research done in the Great Western Woodlands has estimated that currently there are ~950 million tonnes of carbon stored in the vegetation and soils of the region. Carbon that is stored in natural ecosystems such as woodlands is referred to as green carbon. Green carbon is stored in both living and dead plant matter and in soils. Managing natural ecosystems, and the carbon they store, is believed to be crucial in a comprehensive approach to addressing climate change. Large and intense fires are identified as the most significant threat to green carbon stocks in the region. With better management, it is estimated that an additional 600 million tonnes of carbon could be stored in the region. This is equivalent to four times Australia's greenhouse gas emissions for 2008. Maximising the potential carbon stored in the Great Western Woodlands would involve avoiding further degradation of the land and restoring degraded ecosystems back to full maturity.

== Tourist attractions ==
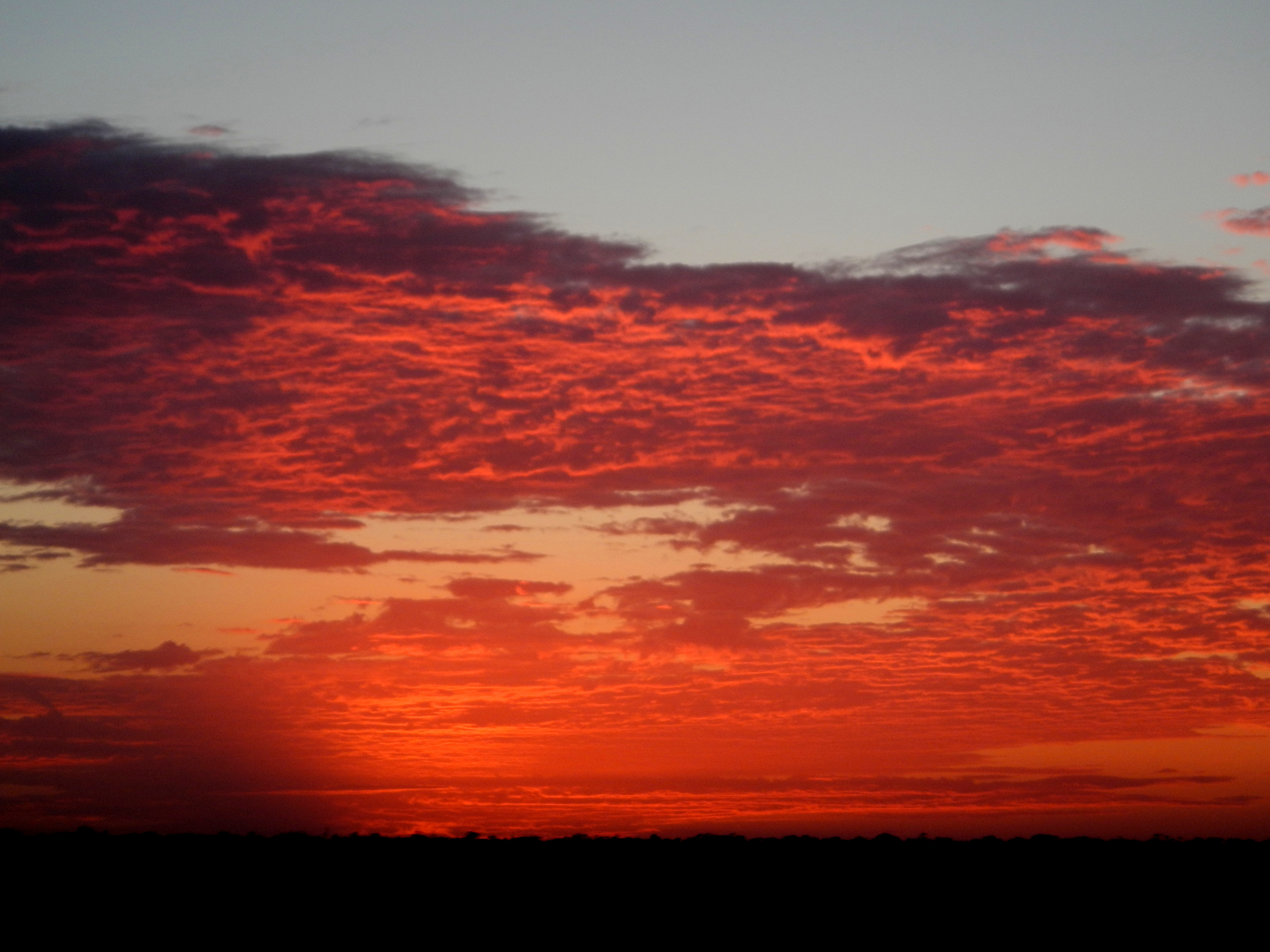
Sunset in the Great Western Woodlands

The Great Western Woodlands attract tourists interested in experiencing four-wheel drive adventures, birdwatching, Indigenous heritage and camping in the Outback.

The historic Holland Track, the Granite and Woodlands Discovery Trail, the Golden Pipeline Heritage Trail and the Golden Quest Discovery Trail provide tourists with opportunities to learn about local history, and to explore granite outcrops and rich biodiversity, including woodland trees and wildflowers.

Tourist destinations include the Karroun Hill Nature Reserve, Boorabbin National Park, Elachbutting Rock and surrounding reserves, Goldfields Woodlands National Park, Mount Palmer and Karalee Rock, Frank Hann National Park, Peak Charles National Park.

== Future management ==
=== Biodiversity and Cultural Conservation Strategy 2010 ===
Between 2008 and 2010 a Great Western Woodlands Stakeholder Reference Group representing the interests of Indigenous people, conservation, pastoralism, mining, tourism and local government was convened by the Department of Environment and Conservation (DEC – now DPAW) to assist in the preparation of the first ever conservation strategy for the woodlands region.

The Western Australian Government allocated $3.8 million to support the strategy and fund projects that were aligned with the priorities identified in the Biodiversity and Cultural Conservation Strategy. This strategy provided guidance for future management of the region, taking into account the diverse economic interests as well as environmental and cultural values of the Great Western Woodlands.

=== Goldfields-Esperance Development Commission 2016 ===
In 2016 The Goldfields-Esperance Development Commission, based in Kalgoorlie, released its Economic Blueprint for the region including the Great Western Woodlands. The Blueprint acknowledges the significance of the woodlands and the opportunity they present for sustainable and diversified economic development in the region:

“We reside in an ancient land, home to globally recognised biodiversity treasures such as the magnificent Great Western Woodlands, as well as rich, red deserts and the bright, white sandy beaches and aqua waters of the Southern Ocean. In a world of increasing urbanisation, our natural assets, wilderness areas and vast expanse of land are a rare commodity. The landscapes and features of our region present a unique marketing position that can be used to attract people and investment from across the continents.”

The Blueprint recommends the preparation of a regional conservation plan covering the woodlands. This plan would involve regional stakeholders, traditional owners, scientists and conservationists.

=== Indigenous land management ===
Following successful native title claims over much of the woodlands, Indigenous groups are re-establishing Aboriginal land management practices such as fire management, as well as tackling feral animals and weeds, establishing tourism ventures and reviving traditional cultural practices. In 2020 Ngadju Indigenous Protected Area was established on Ngadju land, with the Ngadju serving as traditional custodians. The protected area covers 43,993.01 square kilometres (16,985.80 square miles), about a quarter of the Great Western Woodlands.

=== Formal recognition ===
Conservation groups and other community sectors continue to seek appropriate and agreed forms of long term recognition of the Great Western Woodlands – to aid in better planning and management and as a platform for increased promotion of the region.
