= Elachbutting Rock =

Granite rock formation in Western Australia

Coordinates: 30°35′32″S 118°36′33″E

Elachbutting Rock is a granite rock formation located approximately 20 kilometres (12 mi) east of Bonnie Rock and approximately 60 kilometres (37 mi) north east of Mukinbudin in the eastern Wheatbelt region of Western Australia. The rock is situated within Elachbutting Rock Nature Reserve and is part of the Great Western Woodlands.

The large natural rock formation is similar in appearance to Wave Rock and has a number of large cavern areas with several gnamma holes on top. It is surrounded by natural bushland. Another feature is Monty's Pass, a 30-to-40 m (98-to-131 ft) tunnel that runs along the edge of the rock, caused by a rock slide where a large section of the outer layer slid off, possibly as the result of an earthquake. At the end of the tunnel is Kings Cave, an echoing cave.

As with most of the granite outcrops in the Wheatbelt, Elachbutting Rock rises from the ancient Yilgarn craton, the geological plate underlying much of the southern Western Australia, that is between 2.5 and 3.5 billion years in age.

The name is thought to mean 'that thing standing' in the local Indigenous Australian dialect, in reference to the rock being a prominent landmark in the landscape.

Harry Anstey passed through the area in 1887 as he pioneered a route to the Yilgarn goldfields and noted that,

at Eliajbudding, there is an enormous mass of rocks covering between 100-to-200-acre [40 to 81 ha] at which there are cockholes and two wells, and any amount of water that might be conserved [...].

Elachbutting well can be found to the rear of the rock, although there is quite a distance between the well and the base of the granite rock. This well is a good example of the type that were built around the Wheatbelt and provided a natural water supply to the settlers and prospectors. The circular well is very deep, with three or four rows of dry wall stones surrounding the interior. The water seeps in at the base of the well through the rocks.

The site has a campsite, picnic table, a toilet, and parking facilities, and a walk trail around the rock has been constructed by the Shire of Westonia and the Department of Environment and Conservation. The walk trail is along the base of the rock and is around 6 kilometres (3.7 mi) in length. The track is accessible to two- and four-wheel drive vehicles. The top of the rock is a short walk or can also be reached by 4WD, offering a good view of wheat fields to the west and bushland to the east.

Fauna found around the rock include donkey orchids which growing en masse at the base of the rock, and flower in spring and early summer.

== See also ==
- Granite outcrops of Western Australia
