= Helena and Aurora Range =

Mountain range in Western Australia

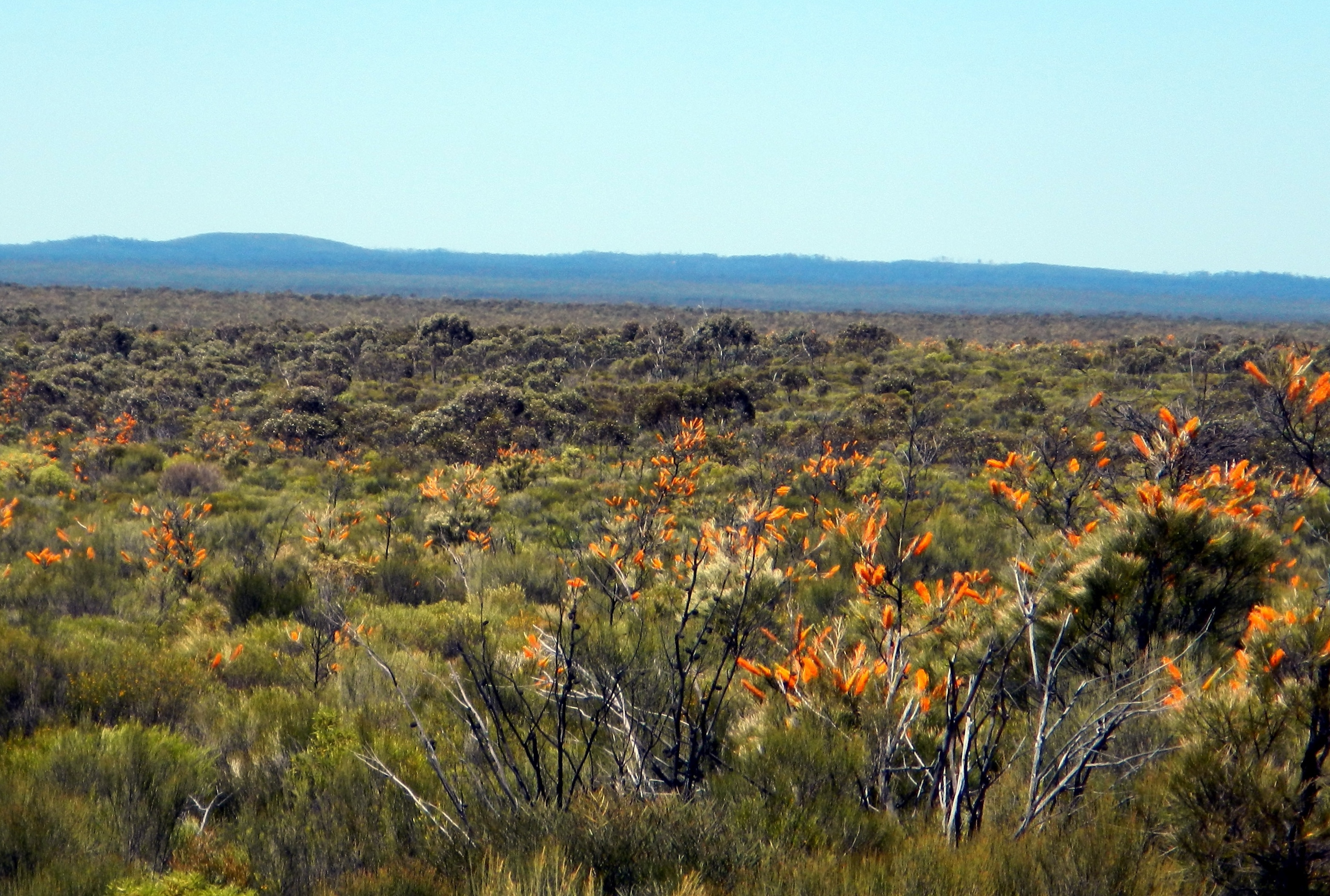
- Helena and Aurora Range

Highest point
- Elevation: 702 m (2,303 ft)

Naming
- Native name: Bungalbin (Kalaamaya)

Geography
- Location within Western Australia
- Country: Australia
- State: Western Australia
- Range coordinates: 30°21′S 119°42′E

The Helena and Aurora Range or Bungalbin is a range of mountains and hills in the Wheatbelt region of Western Australia, 100 kilometres (62 mi) north-east of Southern Cross and 50 km (31 mi) north-east of Koolyanobbing within the Shire of Yilgarn. The range is the largest of six banded ironstone ranges that are situated within the Coolgardie IBRA region. The range has a length of 36.9 km (22.9 mi) and the highest point has an elevation of 702 m (2,303 ft).

The traditional owners of the area are of the Kaprun peoples who speak the Kalaamaya language. The area is home to at least 16 Aboriginal sacred sites.

The area is rich in minerals and was considered as a possible site for an Iron ore mine. In 2017, a proposal to develop the area by Mineral Resources was found to be unacceptable by the Environmental Protection Authority then appealed and rejected by an independent appeals convener. The decision was supported by the state's environment minister Stephen Dawson.

The first stage of the creation of the Helena and Aurora Ranges National Park was completed in February 2021 by Environment minister Stephen Dawson. The park is planned to encompass an area of 333,127 ha (823,170 acres) and includes all of the area that currently belongs to the Helena and Aurora Range nature reserve which is a part of the Great Western Woodlands.
