= Savannah Mine =

Nickel-copper-cobalt mine in Western Australia

- Location in Western Australia
- Interactive map of Savannah Mine
- Location: Halls Creek, Western Australia, Australia; 17°21′3.8″S 128°01′30.2″E
- Products: Nickel Copper Cobalt
- Production: Nickel: 5,402 tonnes Copper: 3,129 tonnes Cobalt: 368 tonnes
- Financial year: 2022–23
- Opened: 2004
- Active: 2004–2015 2019–2020 2021–2024
- Company: Panoramic Resources
- Website: Panoramic Resources website
- Acquired: 2000

Savannah Mine or Savannah Nickel-Copper-Cobalt Mine (formerly the Sally Malay Mine) is an open cut and underground nickel, copper and cobalt mine 104 km (65 mi) north-northeast of Halls Creek in the Kimberley region of Western Australia.

The mine is operated by Panoramic Resources. Unlike the vast majority of nickel mines in Western Australia, which are located in the Goldfields-Esperance region in the south of the state, the Savannah Mine is located in the Kimberley region, in the far-north of Western Australia.

The mine was placed in care and maintenance in early 2024 after its owner, Panoramic Resources, went into voluntary administration.

== History ==
The Sally Malay prospect, located just west of the Great Northern Highway, was originally owned by Normandy Mining until sold to the Mitchell River Group in 2000, a private company.

The Mitchell River Group subsequently formed a publicly listed company, Sally Malay Mining Limited, to develop the project. In 2002–03, the cost of developing the project was estimated at A$54 million, with a start-up date for construction expected in March 2003. Construction commenced in September 2003, with mining scheduled to begin in January 2004 and commissioning of the process plant in the following August. The annual production capacity of nickel at the mine was estimated to between eight and nine thousand tonnes. Shipment of ore to China commenced in September 2004, and, by 2005, the mine employed over 200 people.

Mining was originally carried out in an open pit operation but subsequently moved underground.

By 2005–06, Sally Malay Mining Limited operated a second nickel mine in Western Australia, the Lanfranchi Tramways Mine at Kambalda.

In 2008, the company renamed itself from Sally Malay Mining Limited to Panoramic Resources. From this point onwards, the Sally Malay Mine was also referred to as Savannah. The mine became an important source of copper mining in Western Australia, providing up to 50 percent of the annual production in the state in its first phase of operations and being the largest producer of the commodity in the state.

Low nickel prices forced Panoramic Resources to place both of its mines, Savannah and Lanfranchi, into care and maintenance, Lanfranchi in August 2015 and Savannah in May 2016, an issue that affected other nickel mines in Western Australia as well. At the time of closure, during its first twelve years of operations, the mine had produced 94,600 tonnes of nickel, 53,000 tonnes of copper and 5,000 tonnes of cobalt.

By 2017–18, with nickel prices recovering, the company started planning for the reopening of the Savannah mine, signing new delivery contracts. The cost of restarting production at the mine was estimated to be A$36 million. Panoramic made the decision to focus on the Savannah Mine, selling the Lanfranchi Mine for A$15.1 million to Black Mountain Metals.

The mine briefly reopened in 2019, but was closed once more in April 2020 because of travel restrictions in the Kimberley region in place because of the COVID-19 pandemic and associated cost and supply issues. The mine was restarted once more in late 2021, now with an estimated mine life of twelve years.

In March 2023, the company extended the prospective mine life of Savannah to 2035, with an estimated annual production of 9,400 tonnes of nickel, 5,000 tonnes of copper and 700 tonnes of cobalt during this period.

The mine was placed in care and maintenance in January 2024 after its owner, Panoramic Resources, had gone into voluntary administration the previous month, with the staff of the mine being made redundant. The falling nickel price, having dropped over 40 percent in the previous year, was stated as the main cause for the closure.

== Export ==
The commodities produced at the mine are exported through the port at Wyndham.

Through its operational life, from the start of mining until February 2023, the mine's products were shipped from there to China under an initial agreement signed prior to the original start-up with the Jinchuan Group that was renewed in 2018. All up, 100,000 tonnes of nickel, 60,000 tonnes of copper and 5,000 tonnes of cobalt were shipped during this period. Transport of 1.5 million tonnes of ore took place in 179 shipments, with a total revenue of approximately US$1.68 billion.

In 2021, Panoramic Resources had signed a new five-year delivery contract, now with Singaporean-based French company Trafigura, with shipments commencing in March 2023. As part of the agreement, Trafigura provided the funds required for the mine to resume production in 2021.

== Production ==
Recent annual production of the mine:

Year	Nickel (tonnes)	Copper (tonnes)	Cobalt (tonnes)
2013–14	8,481	5,439	426
2014–15	8,726	5,314	443
2015–16	9,845	6,011	476
2016–2018	Inactive		
2018–19	2,478	1,474	130
2019–2021	Inactive		
2021–22	3,044	1,908	205
2022–23	5,402	3,129	368

== See also ==
- Geology of the Kimberley (Western Australia)
