= Geology of the Kimberley (Western Australia) =

Overview of geology of the Kimberley

Kimberley (Western Australia)
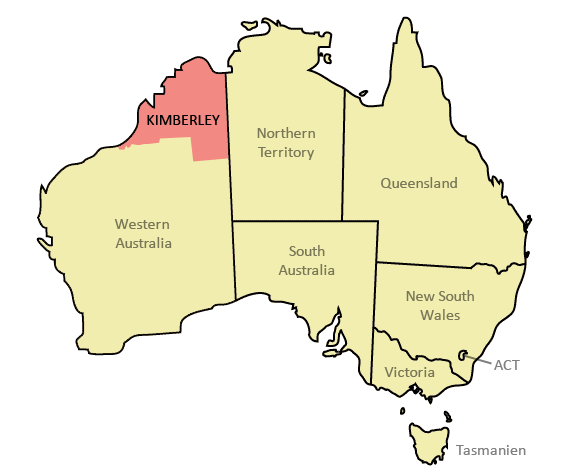

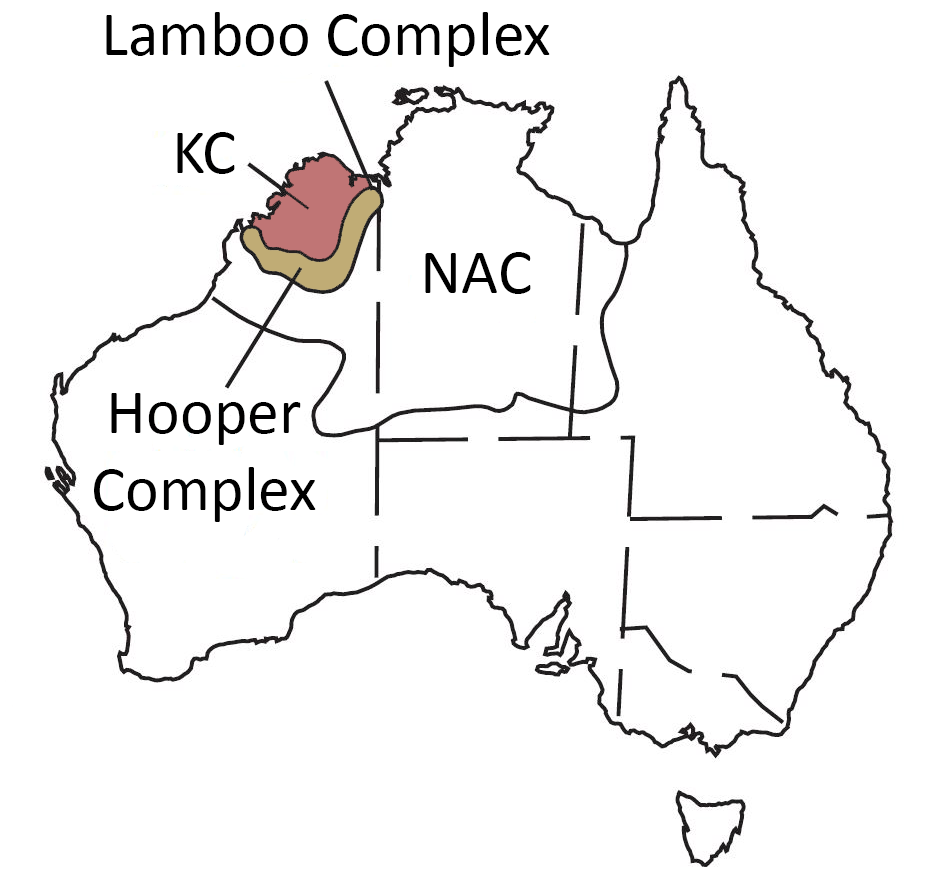
- Map of Australia showing the Kimberley Craton (KC), Hooper Complex, Lamboo Complex and the North Australian Craton (NAC).

Geography
- Location: Western Australia

Administration
- Australia

The geology of the Kimberley, a region of Western Australia, is a rock record of the early Proterozoic eon that includes tectonic plate collision, mountain-building (orogeny) and the joining (suturing) of the Kimberley and Northern Australia cratons, followed by sedimentary basin formation.

The area formed in a slow tectonic plate collision during the Paleoproterozoic era, 2.5–1.6 billion years ago (Ga). The Kimberley Craton, moving south-eastwards, collided with the North Australia Craton, resulting in a series of deformations creating the Hooper Complex and Lamboo Complex. These can be seen today along the southern margin of the Kimberley Craton. During the Proterozoic and Early Phanerozoic eons up to approximately 400 million years ago (Ma), the region had phases of mountain building (orogeny), faulting and sedimentary basin formation. Finally, the two cratons joined (sutured) to become a single craton.

After the main phases of mountain-building, shallow marine and river sediments were deposited on the Kimberley Craton. These sediments form two major sedimentary basins, the Speewah Basin and the Kimberley Basin. Sediment deposition on these basins ended in the Late Paleozoic era (419–252 Ma).

Other major Proterozoic events include the Yampi Orogeny (1.4–1.0 Ga) and Elatina Glaciation (~610 Ma). In the Paleozoic era, there was the King Leopold Orogeny (~560 Ma), the formation of the Kalkarindji Continental Flood Basalt Province (~508 Ma), thermal subsidence during the Early Ordovician period (485–470 Ma), and the Canning Basin (Late Ordovician to Early Cretaceous, 458–100 Ma). During the Neogene period (24–2 Ma), the region was bowed downwards as the Australian Plate met the Indian Plate.

== General geography ==
The Kimberley is the northernmost of the nine regions of Western Australia, with an area of 423,517 square kilometres (163,521 sq mi), about three times the size of England. The principal towns are Broome, Kununurra, and Derby. Approximately 40% of the region's population is of Aboriginal descent.

The Kimberley consists of steep mountain belts to the north, cut through with sandstone and limestone gorges. The northwestern side borders the Indian Ocean. The Kimberley to the south is largely flat arid grassland. The Kimberley is one of the hottest regions of Australia

== Tectonic evolution ==
=== Pre-Hooper Orogeny (> 1900 Ma) ===
Early models of the Kimberley region suggested the region consisted of a stable cratonic basement formed in the Archaean eon (4.0–2.5 Ga), given that the region's granitic composition is similar to the Paleoproterozoic granites found in other parts of Northern Australia. This argument has been challenged by more recent magnetic and gravity surveys indicating that the regional lithologies incorporated recycled orogenic and volcanic arc materials. This incorporation suggests that, rather than having a stable basement, the Kimberley Craton was instead shaped and reshaped by stages of magmatic and mountain-building episodes.

Newer models postulate a convergent margin formed before 1.9 Ga at the southeastern end of the Kimberley Craton, with the North Australian Craton subducted under it. Convergence of the two cratons could have included crustal accretion of exotic terranes (distinct fragments of earlier crust). Accretion of the terranes was likely to have increased friction between the overlying and subducting plates, which may have impeded further slab subduction and caused the deeper parts of the Northern Australian plate to break off; this is known as slab detachment and lithospheric delamination.

In the Western Zone, turbiditic sediments of the Marboo Formation began to be deposited around 1872 Ma, during post-collisional rifting of the Kimberley Craton and North Australian Craton.

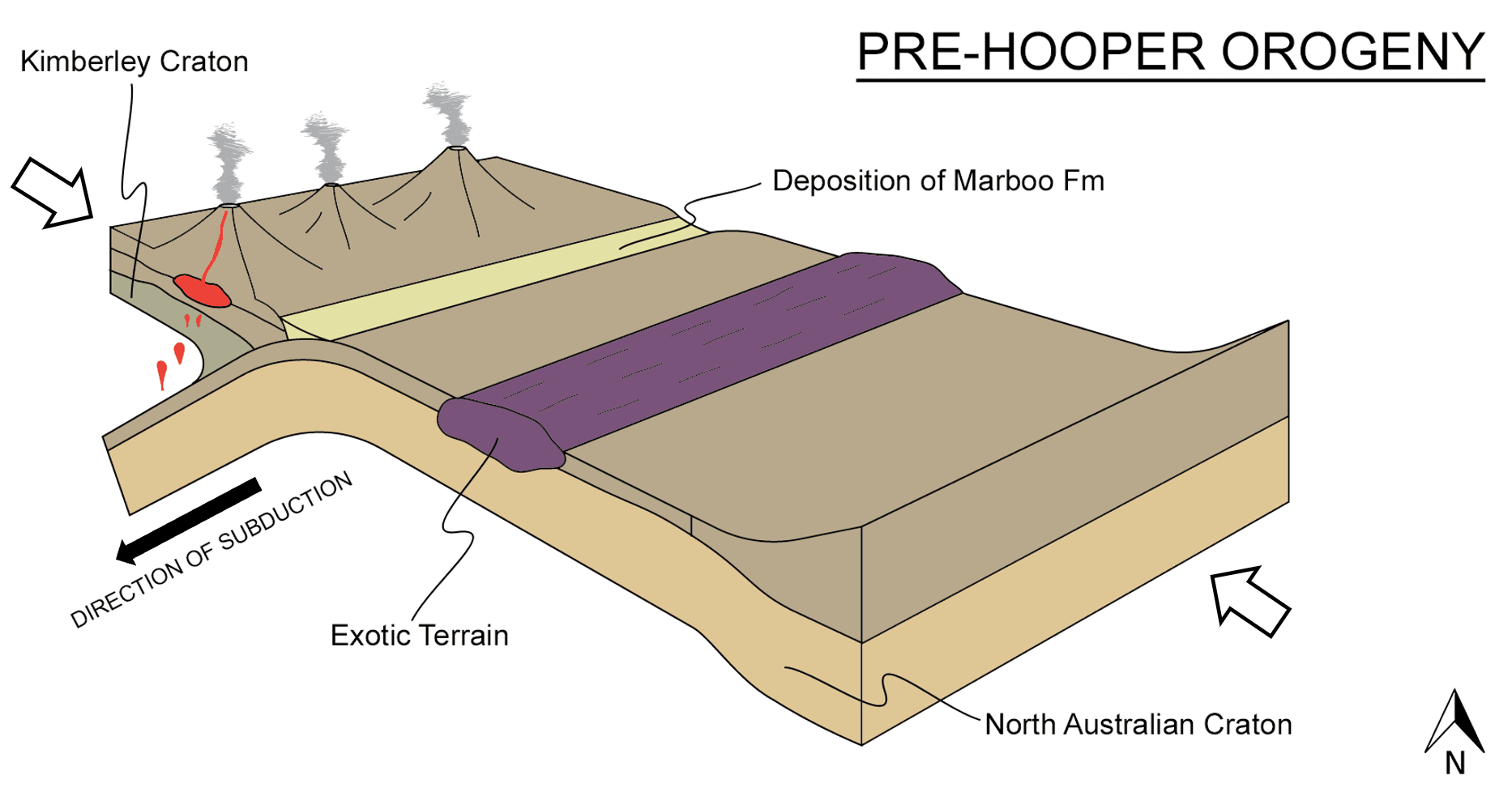
Pre-Hooper Orogeny: Subduction and accretion of exotic terrane under the Kimberley Craton.

=== Early Hooper Orogeny (1865-1856 Ma) ===
Slab detachment removed the mass of the downgoing slab from the remaining Northern Australian plate, altering its lithospheric isostasy; the tendency of the plate to sink decreased. The loss of the descending slab also changed mantle flow traction, which caused a subduction polarity reversal; the Kimberley Craton began to subduct under the now lighter Northern Australian plate. Partial melting of the descending slab in the newly formed subduction zone fueled the formation of a volcanic arc, the Tickalara Oceanic Arc.

Sedimentary rocks, mafic volcanic and volcaniclastic rocks deposited in the Central Zone of the Lamboo Complex are together classified as the Tickalara Metamorphics, which were deformed and initially metamorphosed during the Hooper Orogeny (1865 - 1856 Ma). While it has been widely accepted that the formation of the Central Zone is due to the development of the Tickalara Oceanic Arc, an alternative ensialic marginal basin model may also be able to explain the genesis of the Tickalara Metamorphics, in place of the subduction reversal.

The freshly consolidated Marboo Formation experienced metamorphism of various grades throughout the Hooper Orogeny, along with extensive mafic intrusions, which were especially prominent during its earlier stages. It was then overlain by the felsic Whitewater Volcanics, during a period of eruptions at around 1856 Ma.

A passive margin developed along the edge of the North Australian Craton in the Eastern Zone, depositing siliciclastic and volcanic rocks of the Halls Creek Group. Deposition of the Halls Creek Group ceased during the final stages of the Hooper Orogeny, around 1847 Ma.

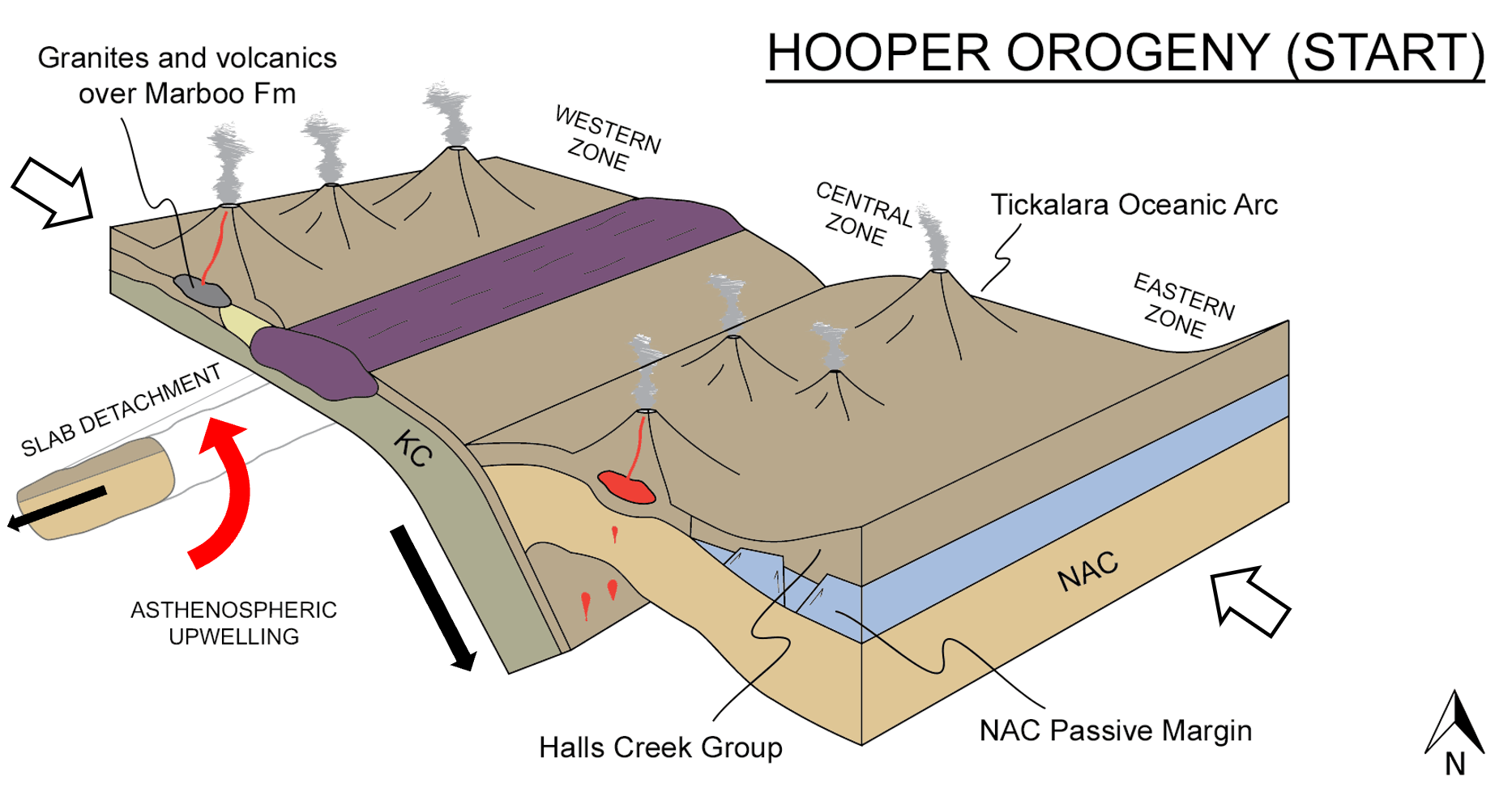
Early Hooper Orogeny: Convergence of the Kimberley Craton to the North Australian Craton and development of the Tickalara Oceanic Arc.

=== Late Hooper Orogeny (1856-1850 Ma) ===
Enhanced partial melting, as a result of further subduction during the later stages of the Hooper Orogeny, produced widespread mafic and ultramafic intrusions in the Central Zone, with intrusions of the Paperbark Supersuite in the Western Zone, and the intrusions of the Panton Suite in the Eastern Zone.

The Tickalara Metamorphics were further deformed and metamorphosed up to the amphibolite and granulite metamorphic facies during the 1856-1850 Ma period of the Hooper Orogeny.

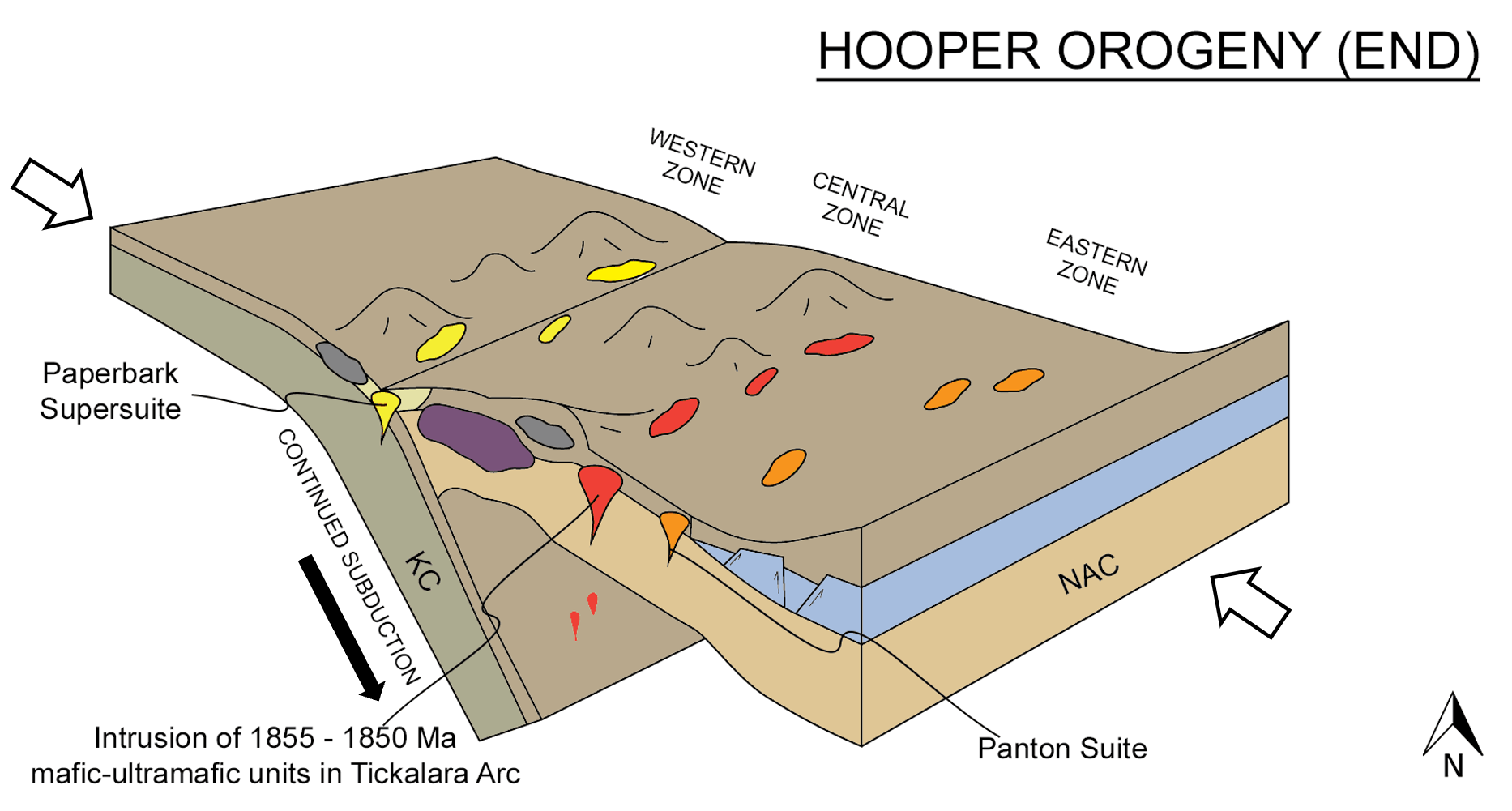
Late Hooper Orogeny: Mafic-ultramafic intrusions and deformation of the Central Zone.

=== Post Hooper Orogeny (1850-1845 Ma) ===
After the Hooper Orogeny, the downgoing slab, which had been deeply subducted into the asthenosphere, detached from the surface portion of the tectonic plate. The resulting change in isostasy temporarily buoyed the thinned-out Kimberley Craton section above the North Australian Craton, leading to the formation of the accretionary wedge of the Tickalara Arc, and setting the stage for the later suturing of the Kimberley Craton and North Australian Craton.

During this period the Tickalara Metamorphics in the Central Zone were intruded by tonalite and trondhjemite sheets, resulting in high-grade metamorphism. Further geochemical analyses have shown that the igneous intrusions have a chemical composition similar to that of other Phanerozoic continental margins, with a strong resemblance to known subduction, back-arc spreading, and island arc systems. This may support an oceanic island arc or back arc setting.

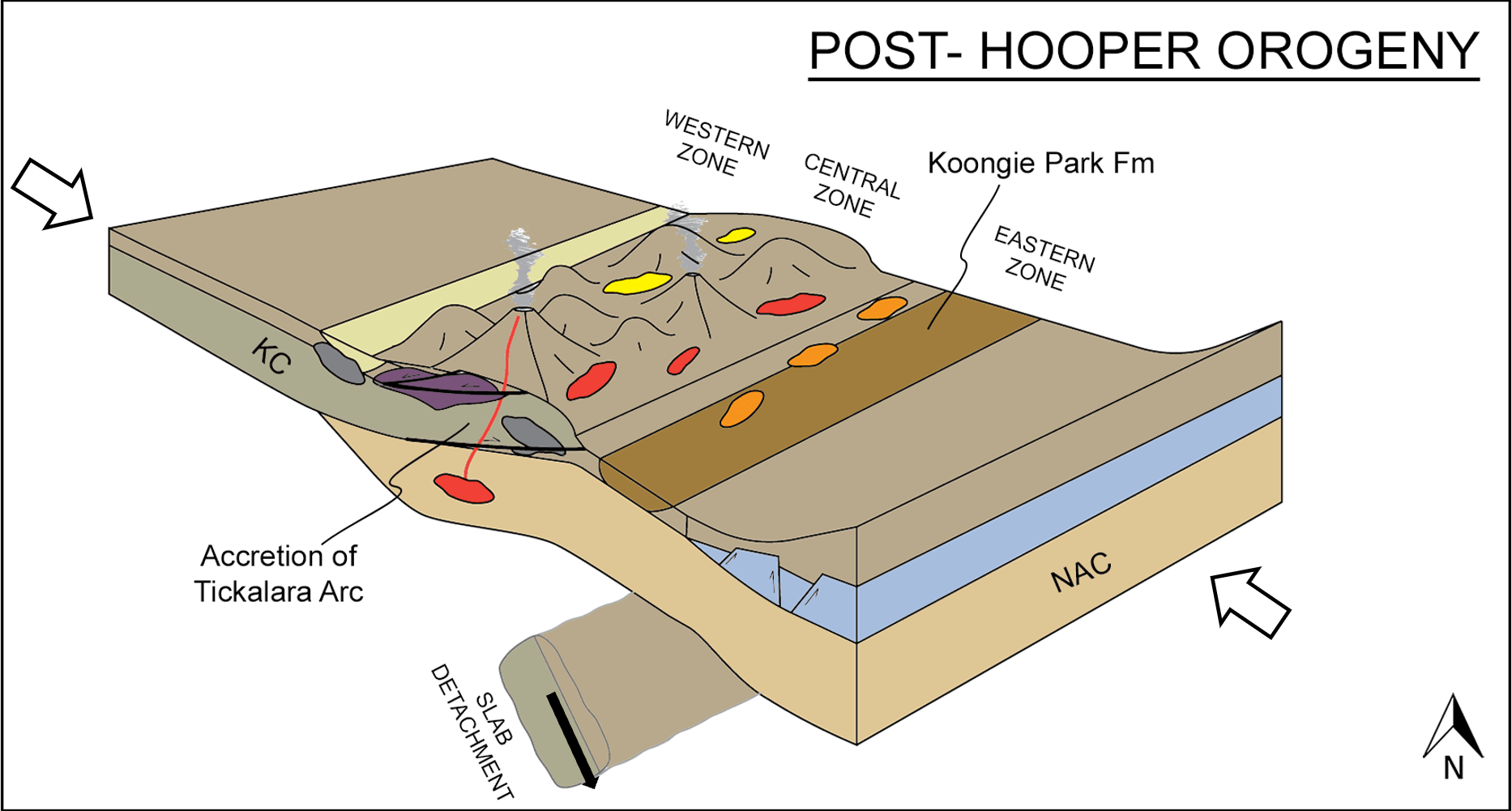
Post-Hooper Orogeny: Accretion of the Tickalara Arc and development of the Koongie Park Formation.

=== Halls Creek Orogeny (1835-1810 Ma) ===
Halls Creek Orogeny is the first mountain-building event that affected all three zones of the Lamboo/Hooper Complex. It was caused by the convergence forces experienced at the plate margins, and eventually began to suture the Kimberley Craton to the North Australian Craton.

The Sally Downs Supersuite, consisting of intrusions of felsic to mafic magma, mostly intruded into the Tickalara Metamorphics of the Central Zone, but also intermittently appears in the Eastern and Western Zones. The final fate of the North Australian Craton in relation to its now overlying Kimberley Craton is still debatable. The diagram provided below displays a full suture between the cratons. However, isotopic and geochemical studies of the Sally Downs Supersuite have shown incorporation of a portion of mantle-derived material. The geochemistry suggests that before a complete suture formed, the section of the North Australian Craton directly underlying the Kimberley Craton may have detached, instigating a short period of renewed northwest-dipping subduction (that is, the Northern Australian plate again subducting under the Kimberley plate).

The Halls Creek Orogeny also resulted in silica-rich sedimentary and felsic volcanic rocks, collectively termed the Speewah Group, being eroded from the new highlands and deposited over the Kimberley Craton. These deposits are called the Speewah and Kimberley Basins.

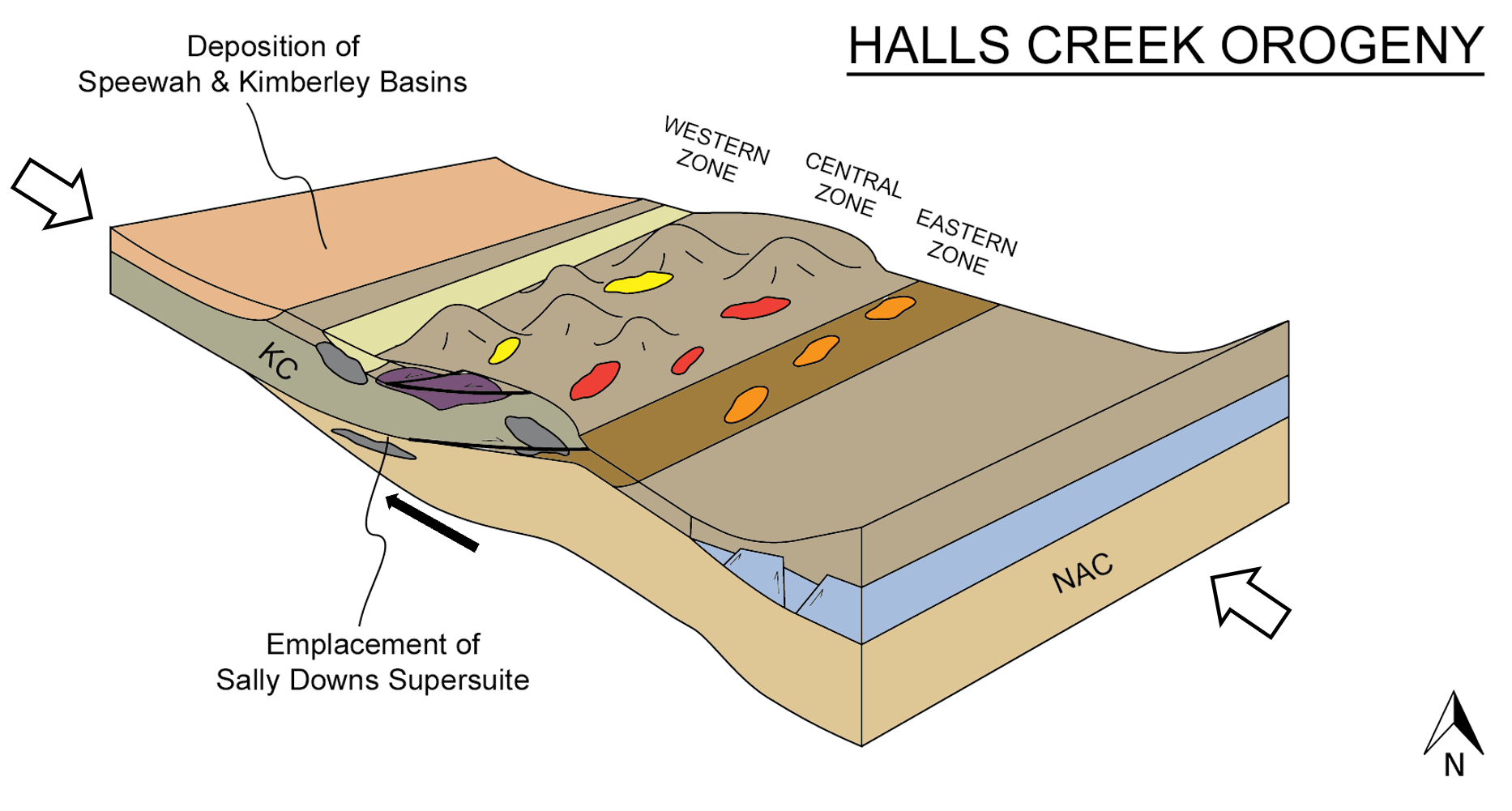
Halls Creek Orogeny: Emplacement of the Sally Downs Supersuite and suturing of the Kimberley Craton to the North Australian Craton.

=== Speewah Basin (1835 Ma) ===
The siliclastic sedimentary and felsic volcanic rocks of the Speewah Group began to be deposited into the Speewah Basin, east of the margin between Kimberley Craton and North Australian Craton, during and immediately after the Halls Creek Orogeny. Sediments of the Speewah Group have a maximum depth of 1.5 kilometres (0.93 mi), thinning significantly towards the west. They are deposited unconformably over the Western Zone, overlapping with the deposition of the Kimberley Group. The depositional periods of the sediments, determined from rocks near the bottom of the basin, indicate that the Speewah Basin formed around 1835 Ma, at the same time as the granitic and gabbroic intrusions.

=== Kimberley Basin (1800 Ma) ===
Discomformably overlaying the Speewah Group and up to 3 kilometres (1.9 mi) deep, the Kimberley Basin consists of siliciclastic sedimentary and felsic volcanic rocks of the Kimberley Group. The group broadly includes the Moola Bulla, Red Rock, Texas Downs, and Revolver Creek. Paleocurrent data suggest that deposition of the Kimberley Group occurred in a semi-enclosed shallow marine basin.

== Alternative models ==
The origin of the Tickalara Metamorphics is still debated. An alternative model proposes an ensialic marginal basin, rather than an oceanic arc, at the time of the Early Hooper Orogeny (1865-1856 Ma).

=== Ensialic marginal basin model ===
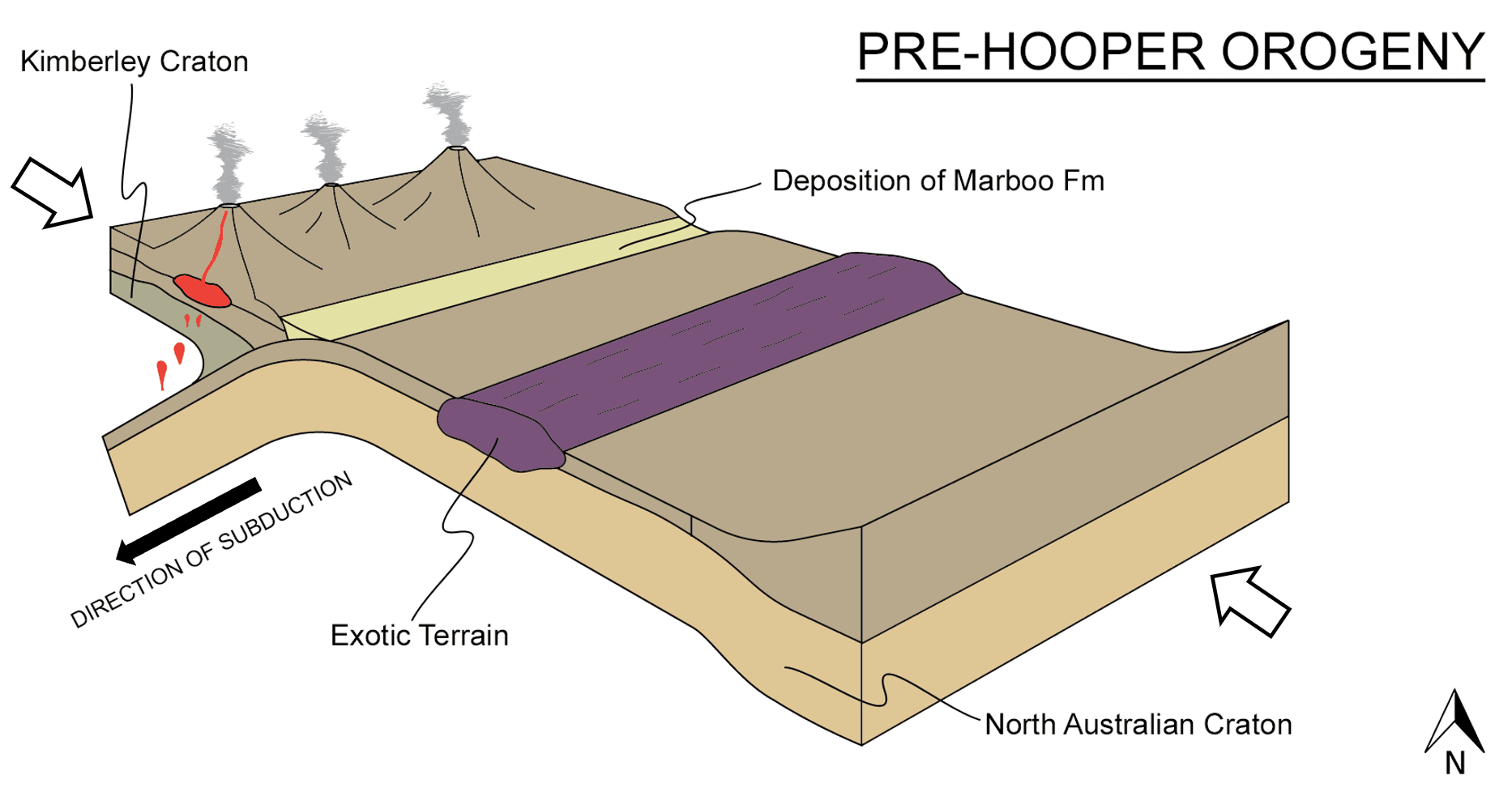
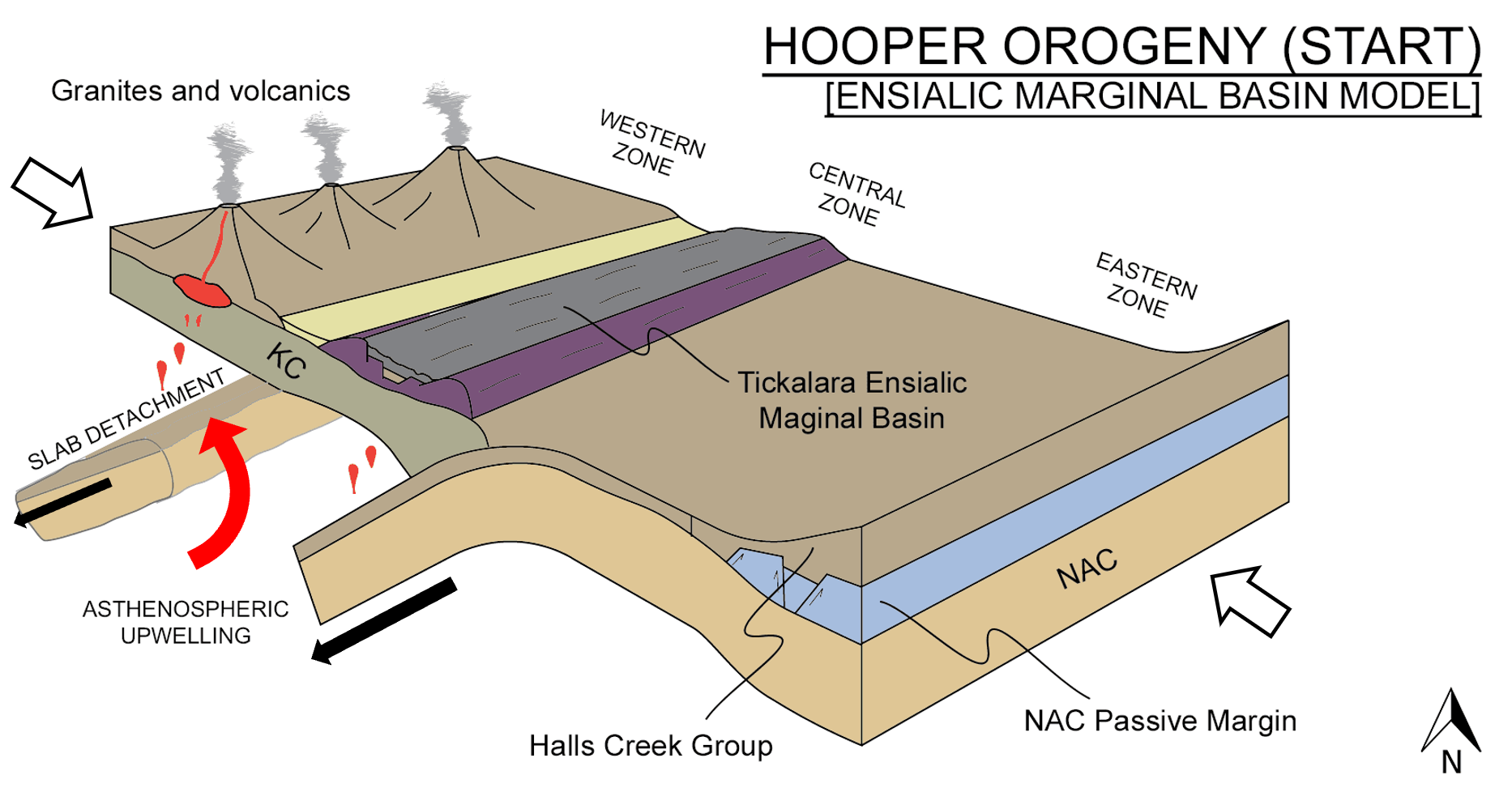
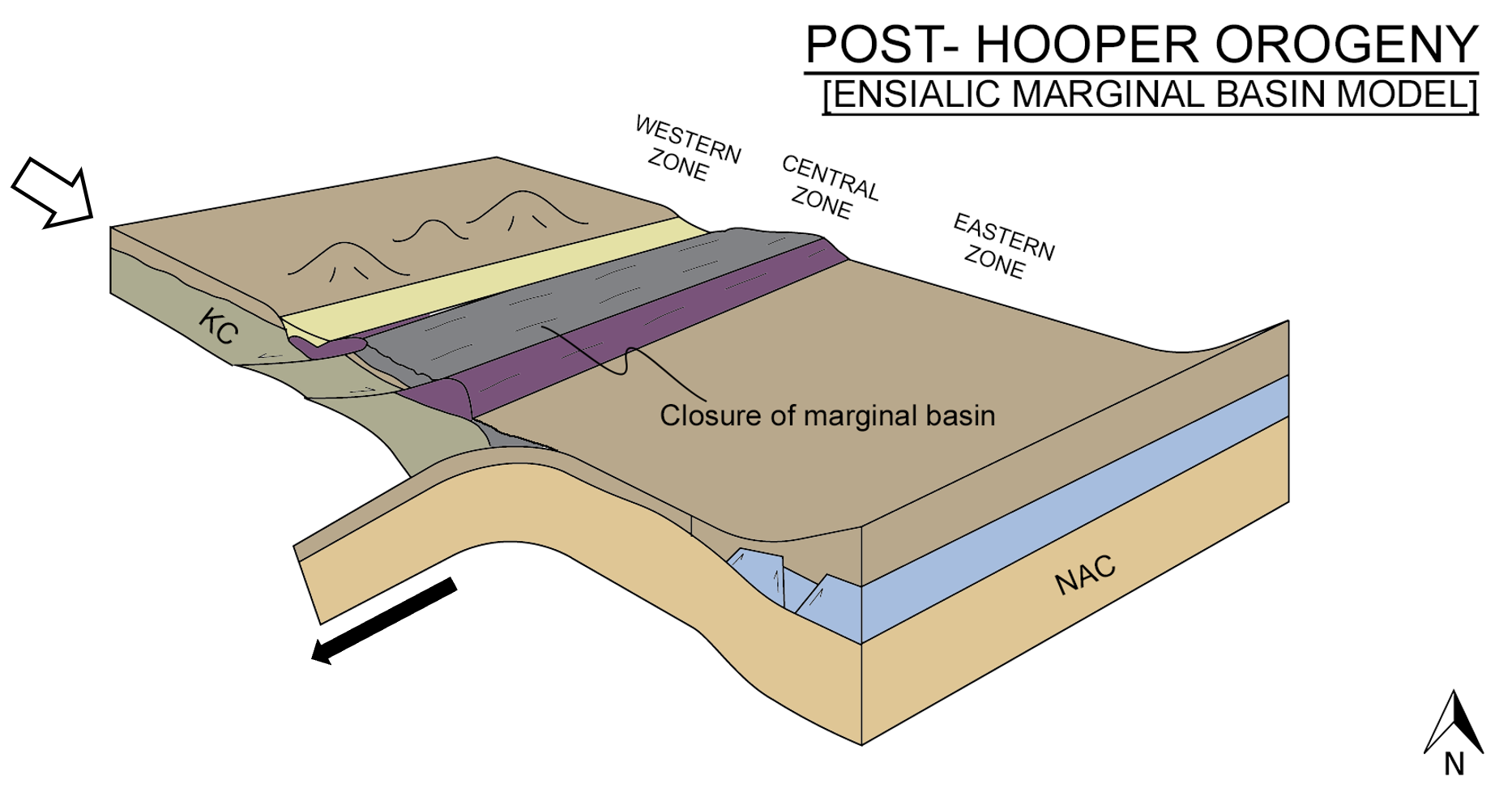
Formation of the Tickalara Metamorphics, in an ensialic marginal basin model. Pre-Hooper Orogeny, top; early stage, middle; late stage, bottom.

Instead of a reversed subduction polarity during Early Hooper Orogeny, this model proposes that an ensialic marginal basin formed as the subduction zone progressively slowed after colliding with continental fragments (terranes). The marginal basin may have closed during the late Hooper Orogeny and post-Hooper Orogeny, as a result of the deformation and metamorphism associated with the orogeny.

The intruded tonalite and trondhjemite sheets of the Tickalara Metamorphics may not be the product of the melting of mafic rocks alone; some older rocks may also have melted. This incorporation of older rocks is common in modern ensialic marginal basins.

== Regional geology ==
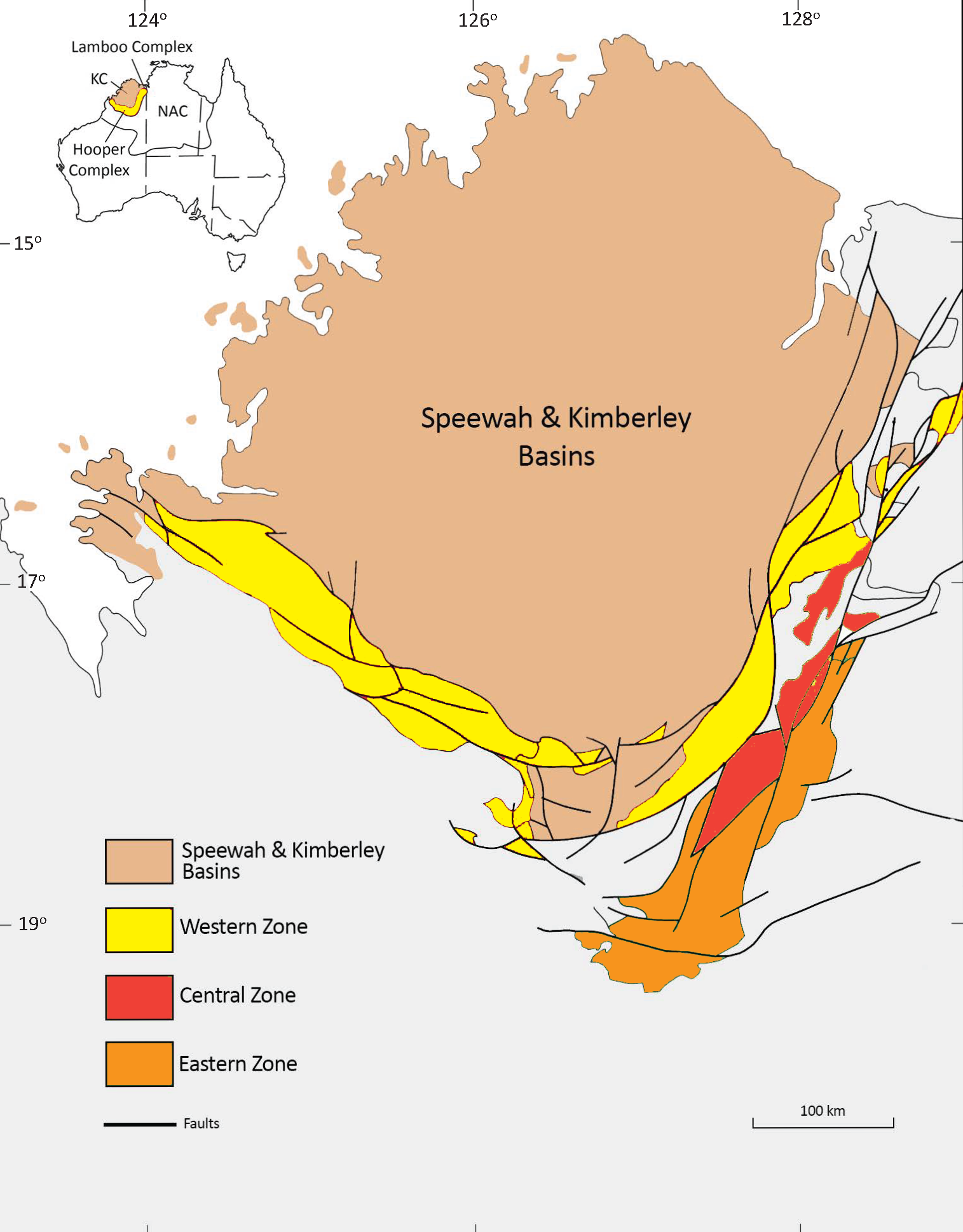
Simplified geological map of the Kimberley region, showing the three major zones of the Lamboo Complex. Inset shows the location on the continent of Australia.

The current regional geology of the Kimberley can be divided into three major units:

- the Kimberley Craton (underlying the Speewah and Kimberley Basins).
- the Hooper Complex (also referred to as the Hooper Province).
- the Lamboo Complex (also referred to as the Lamboo Province).

=== Hooper and Lamboo Complexes ===
The Lamboo Complex is a series of exposed and interconnected mountain (orogenic belts) belts, which run along the southeastern margin of the Kimberley Craton. The Hooper Complex is similar to the Lamboo Complex but lies to its west, on the southwestern margin of the Kimberley Craton. The two complexes are considered as displaced parts of a single feature.

The Lamboo complex is further subdivided into three zones: the Western Zone (contiguous with the Hooper Complex), the Central Zone, and the Eastern Zone, each with different tectonic and stratigraphic characteristics. Formed during the early Paleoproterozoic, the zones formed in different tectonic settings, resulting in their distinct characteristics across zone boundaries. Studies of the region's magnetic anomaly imply that the Western Zone and Central Zone did not collide against each other until the final stages of the Hooper Orogeny, while the Eastern Zone did not collide until the final stages of Halls Creek Orogeny.

==== Western Zone ====
The Western Zone is dominated by intrusions of both course-grained, coeval granite and gabbro. These belong to the Paperbark Supersuite of rocks, dating from 1865-1850 Ma. It also contains the Marboo Formation (1870 Ma), which is the oldest exposed rock unit in the Western Zone. The Marboo Formation consists of varying metamorphic grades of metamorphosed sedimentary rocks. Before they were metamorphosed, the rocks are thought to have been repeating layers of sandstone, siltstone, and mudstone deposited by turbidity currents. During the early deposition and consolidation stages of the Marboo Formation, there were many intrusions of mafic magma, which formed rock bodies of varying sizes. The mafic intrusions and the sedimentary rocks they intruded metamorphosed together, and were later overlain by the eruptions of Whitewater Volcanics.

==== Central Zone ====
The Central Zone is dominated by the Tickalara Metamorphics (1865 Ma), the oldest rock unit in this zone. They incorporate metamorphosed sedimentary rocks similar to those in the Western Zone, from a similar deposition environment, but with higher grades of metamorphism. It also contains some mafic volcanic and volcaniclastic rocks metamorphosed between 1865–1856 Ma, and at 1850–1845 Ma. Before and during metamorphism, the Tickalara Metamorphics were intruded by layers of granites, and of tonalites and trondhjemites that are only formed in high-grade metamorphism. The nature of the Tickalara Metamorphics' transition from sedimentary to volcanic and metamorphic facies suggests the formation and development of an oceanic island arc at around 1865 Ma.

At 1845-1840 Ma the Tickalara Metamorphics were overlaid and encrusted with the eruption of mafic to felsic volcanic rocks, comprising the Koongie Park Formation. During the subsequent Halls Creek Orogeny (1835-1805 Ma), the entire Central Zone was prominently intruded by granites and gabbros, which belong to the Sally Downs Supersuite.

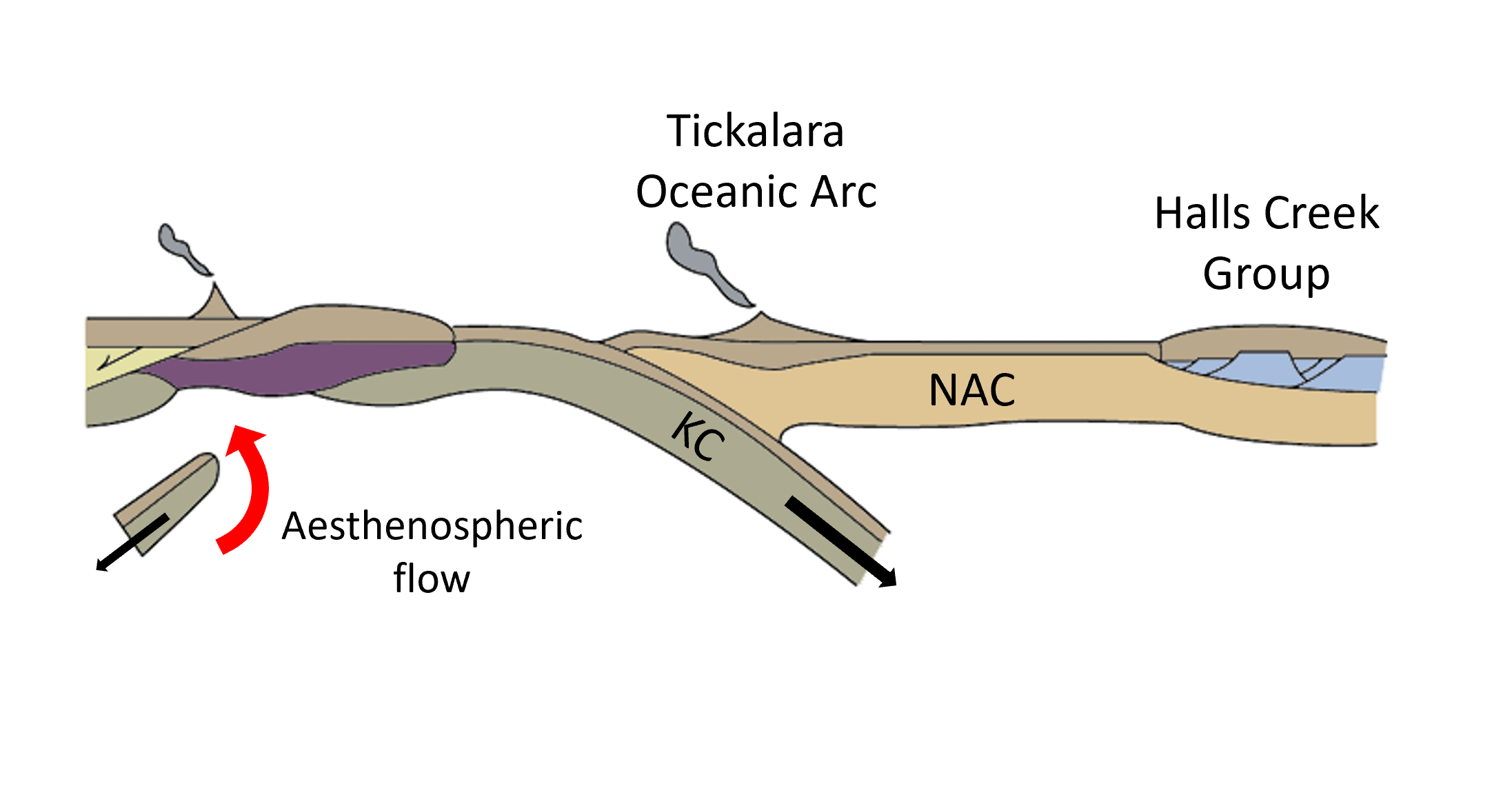
Tectonic setting during the formation of the Tickalara Oceanic Arc, circa 1865 Ma before present.

==== Eastern Zone ====
The Eastern Zone contains mafic and felsic volcanic rocks. These were intruded by the granitoid Ding Dong Downs Volcanics, at around 1910 Ma. Both were overlain unconformably by low-grade metamorphic-sedimentary and metamorphic-volcanic rocks, belonging to the Halls Creek Group, which was then metamorphosed during the Halls Creek Orogeny (1835-1805 Ma), and later sutured to the zone by the intrusion of the Sally Downs Supersuite (1820-1810 Ma). The basement of the Halls Creek Group consists of pure quartz sandstone, likely deposited in a fluvial depositional setting, which was later overlain unconformably by mafic, felsic and alkaline volcanic rocks during 1880 Ma and 1857-1848 Ma.

Studies of the zircon ages of lithologies above the alkaline volcanics show that deposition of the upper sequences of the Halls Creek Group occurred at the same time as the metamorphic stages of the Central Zone. Combined with magnetic anomaly surveys, this indicates that the Eastern Zone could not have been adjacent to the Central Zone during that period.

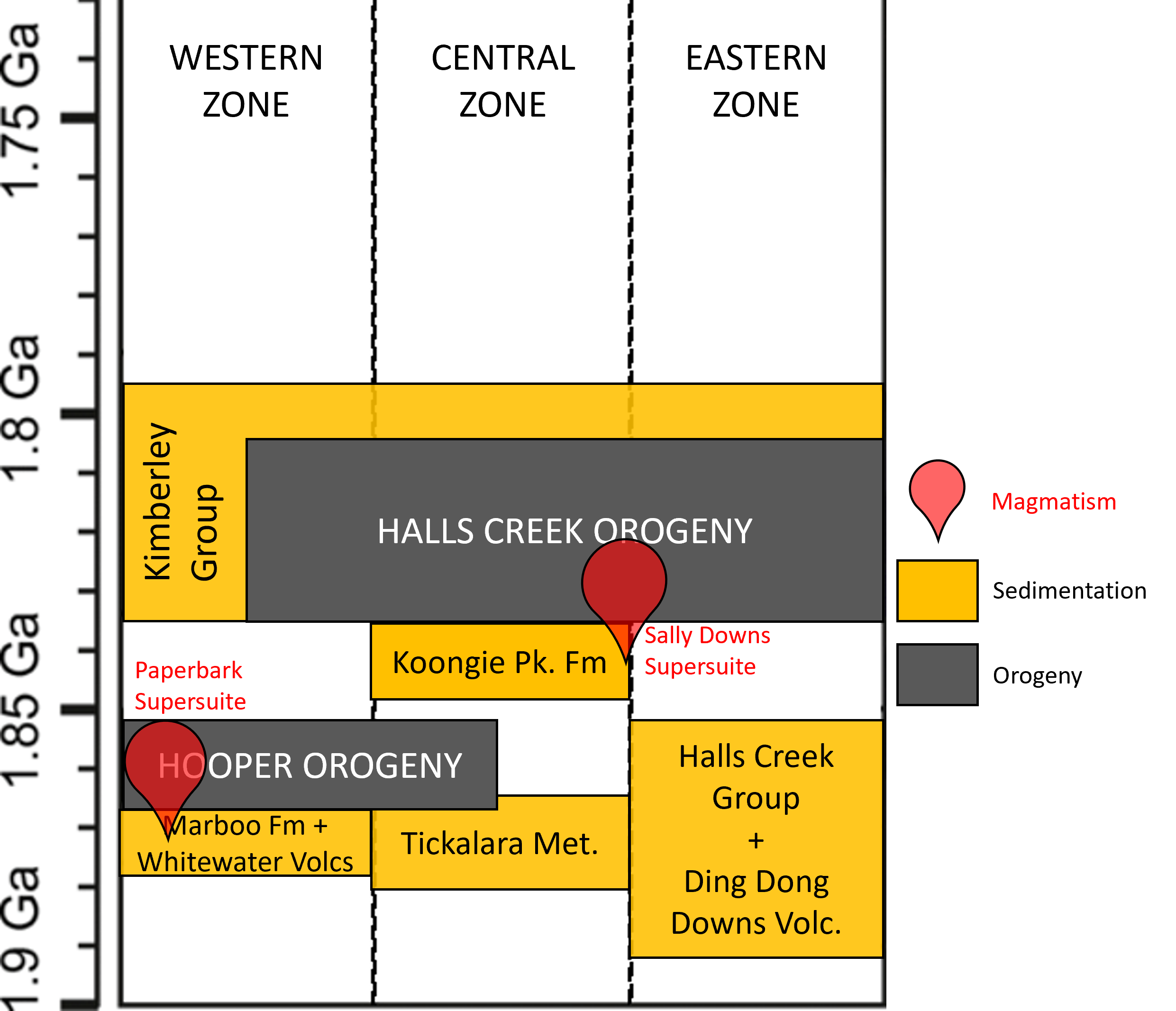
Simplified time and space plot showing major tectonostratigraphic units of the three zones.

| AGE | ZONE | MAJOR UNITS | LITHOLOGY | OROGENY |
|---|---|---|---|---|
| 1870 Ma | Western Zone | Marboo Formation (1870 Ma); Whitewater Volcanics; Paperbark Supersuite (1865-1850 Ma) | Low- to high-grade turbiditic metasedimentary rocks; Felsic metavolcanic rocks; Potassic, I-type granitic and sub-volcanic rock | Halls Creek Orogeny (1835-1810 Ma); Hooper Orogeny (1865-1850 Ma) |
| 1865 Ma | Central Zone | Tickalara Metamorphics (1865 Ma); Koongie Park Formation (1845-1840 Ma); Sally Downs Supersuite (1820-1810) | Medium- to high-grade turbiditic metasedimentary and mafic volcanic/volcaniclastic rocks; Sedimentary, mafic, and felsic volcanic rocks; Granite and gabbro | Halls Creek Orogeny (1835-1810 Ma); Hooper Orogeny (1865-1850 Ma) |
| 1920 Ma | Eastern Zone | Ding Dong Downs Volcanics (1920-1910Ma); Halls Creek Group (1910-1810 Ma); Sally Downs Supersuite (1820-1810) | Mafic and felsic volcanic rocks, granitic rocks; low-grade metasedimentary and metavolcanic rocks; Granite | Halls Creek Orogeny (1835-1810 Ma) |
