= Gold mining =

Process of extracting gold from the ground

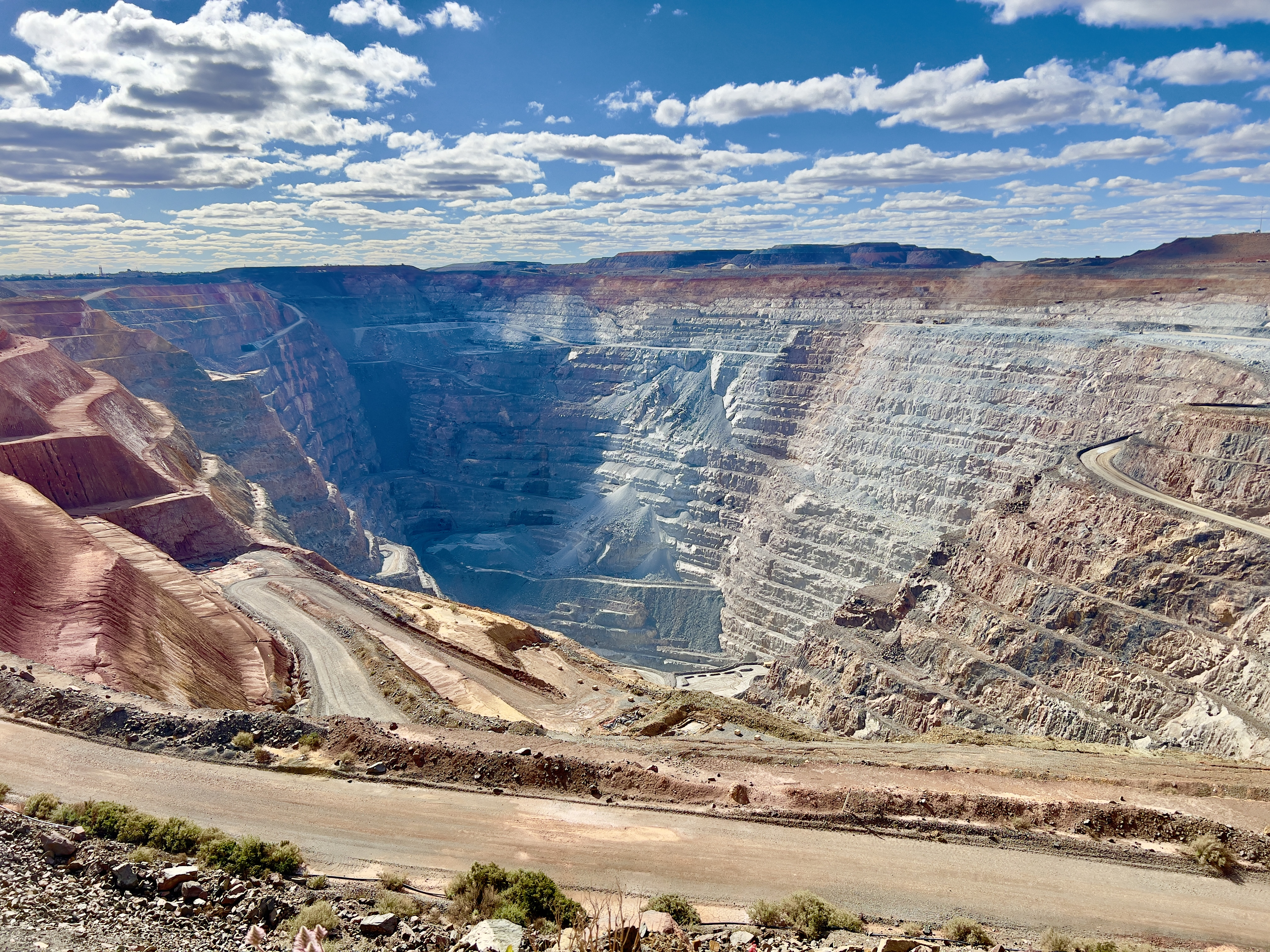
Super Pit gold mine at Kalgoorlie in Western Australia, 2023

History of a Lump of Gold, 1885

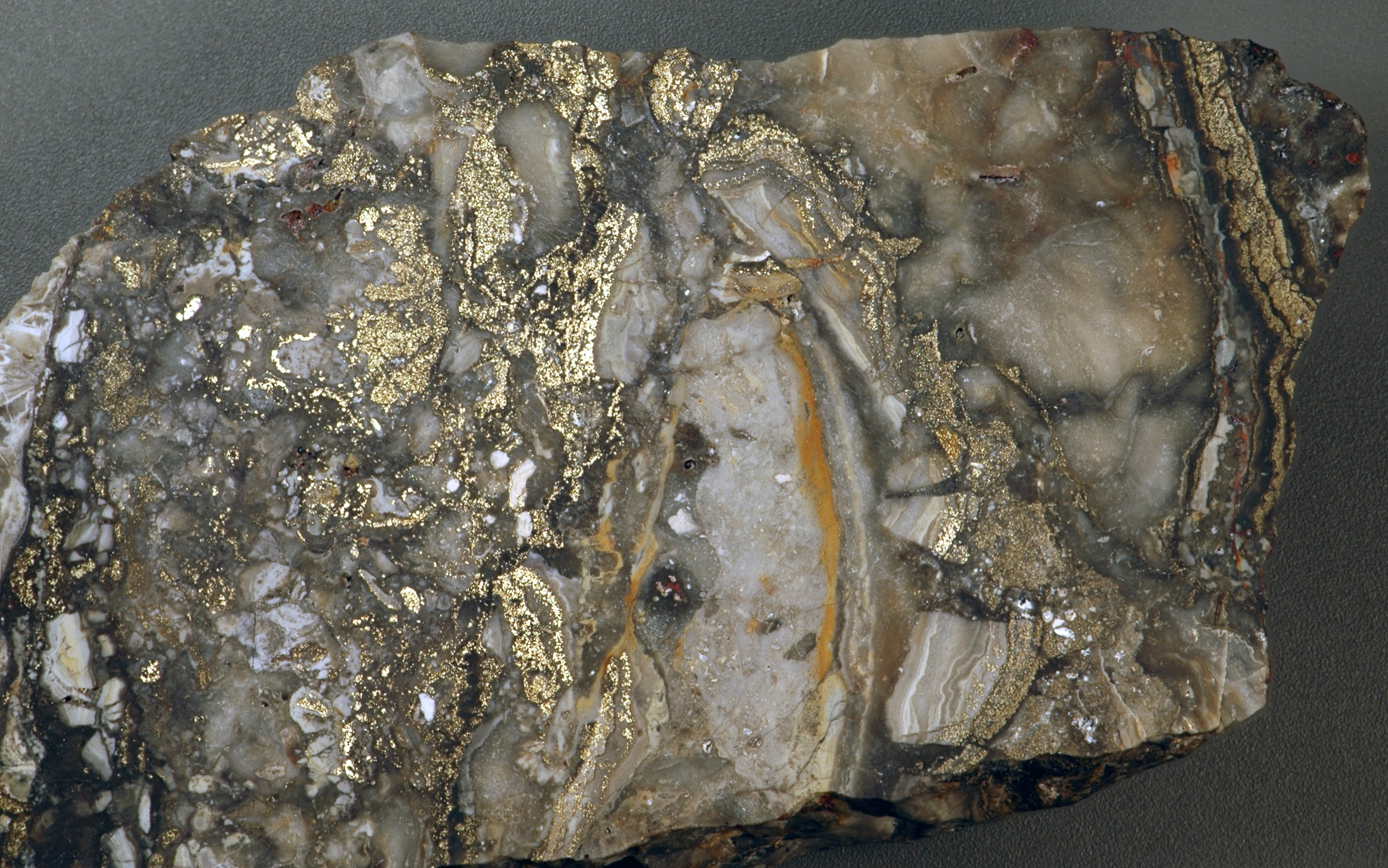
Bonanza gold ore from the Sleeper Mine in northern Nevada. Field of view ~10.5 centimeters across.

Gold mining involves the extraction of gold either via conventional mining or via placer mining, as it is a soft metal, gold is relatively easy to separate from its surrounding. Global gold production is estimated at approximately 4,000–5,000 metric tons per year, with the majority coming from newly mined sources. Historically, gold mining from alluvial deposits used manual separation processes, such as gold panning. The expansion of gold mining to ores that are below the surface has led to more complex extraction processes such as large scale pit mining and chemical extraction processes such as gold cyanidation.

The history of gold mining dates to at least 4700 BC, with gold being a valuable metal in many parts of the world. In empires like Rome and Egypt, gold mining would be seen as source of wealth and power for governments. Gold also represented a person's wealth and power. Gold rushes have been driving forces of migration and industrialization in many parts of the world, starting in the middle ages in parts of Europe, and played an important role in waves of colonization in the Americas. 19th Century Gold rushes to California, the Klondike, South Africa and Australia all led to large migrations of speculators.

In the 20th and 21st centuries, large corporations produce the vast majority of the gold mined. As a result of the increasing value of gold, there are also millions of small, artisanal miners in many parts of the Global South. As with all mining, human rights and environmental issues are important issues in the gold mining industry, and can result in environmental conflict. In mines with less regulation such as smaller artisanal mines, health and safety risks are much higher, negatively affecting people operating in poorer geographies.

== History ==
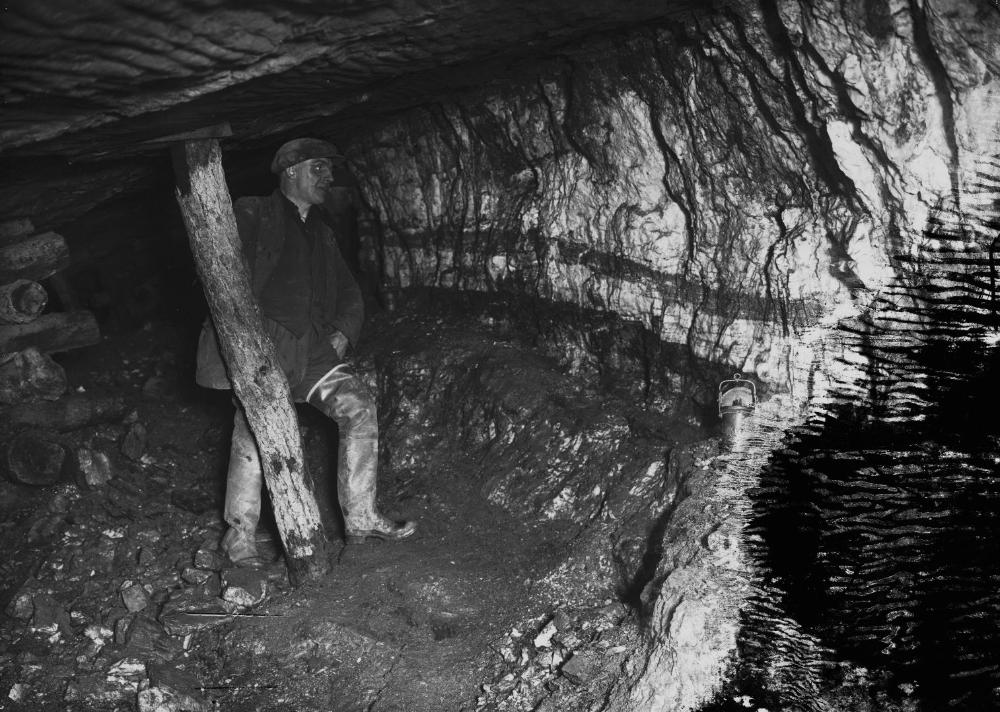
A miner underground at Pumsaint gold mine, Wales, c. 1938

The exact date when humans first began to mine gold is unknown, but some of the oldest known gold artifacts have been found in the Varna Necropolis in Bulgaria. The graves of the necropolis were built between 4700 and 4200 BC, suggesting that gold mining could be over 6,700 years old. During a series of excavations carried out between 1878 and 1992, several graves were found with more than 6 kg (13 lb) of gold. A group of German and Georgian archaeologists claims the Sakdrisi site in southern Georgia, dating to the 3rd or 4th millennium BC, might be the world's oldest known gold mine.

=== Ancient times ===
==== Prehistoric period ====
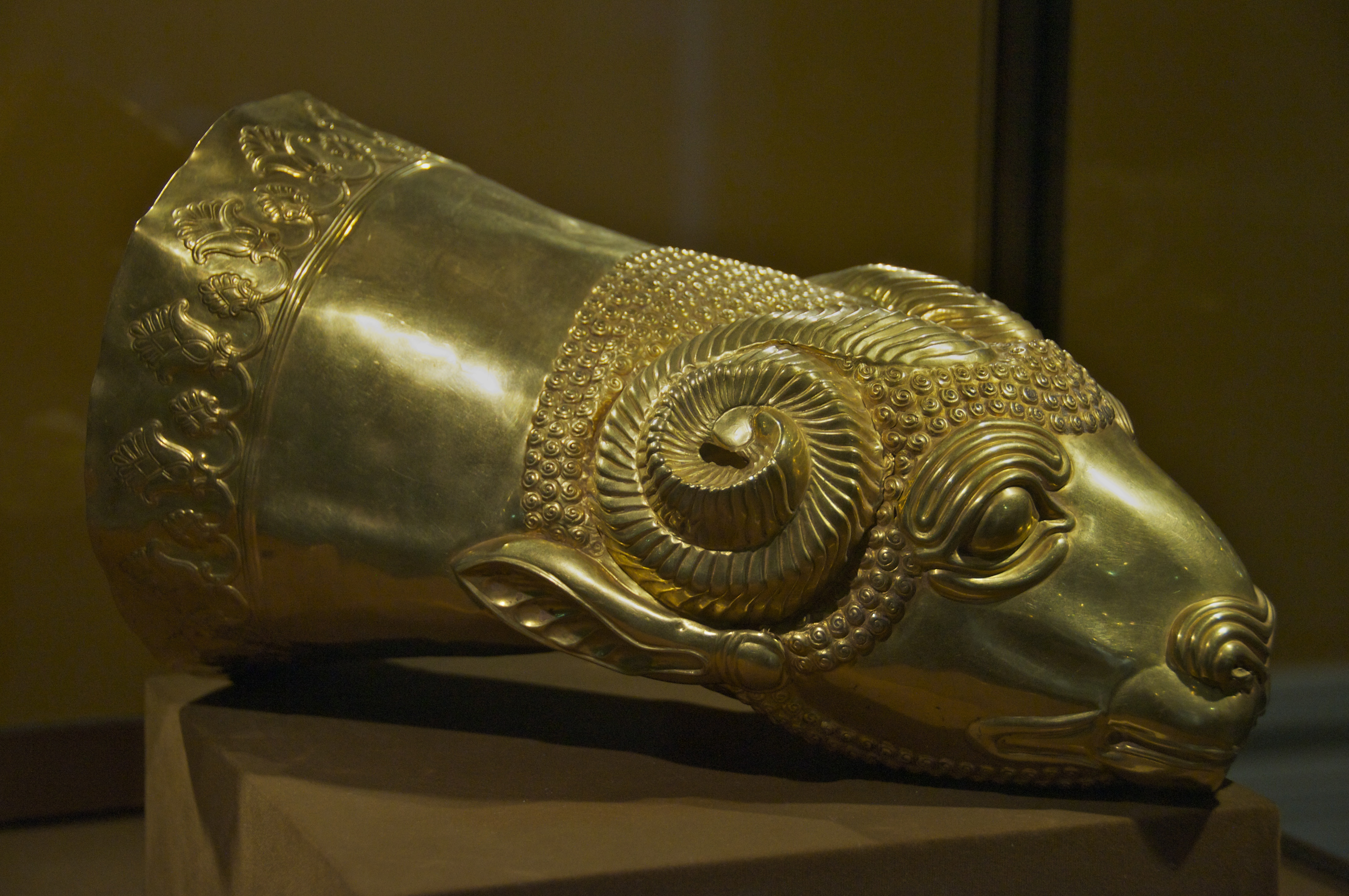
Gold Rhyton in the form of a Ram's Head, from the Ziwiye hoard in Mesopotamia, late 7th - early 6th century B.C.E.

Gold has been valued by most human cultures since prehistoric times. Archaeological evidence suggests that humans were mining gold as far back as 4000 BCE, with some of the earliest known gold artifacts dating back to ancient Mesopotamia. Particularly in the region of present-day Iraq, gold was mined extensively. Around 2500 BCE, the ancient Sumerians developed sophisticated techniques for extracting gold from alluvium deposits and underground mines. These techniques included the use of sluice boxes.

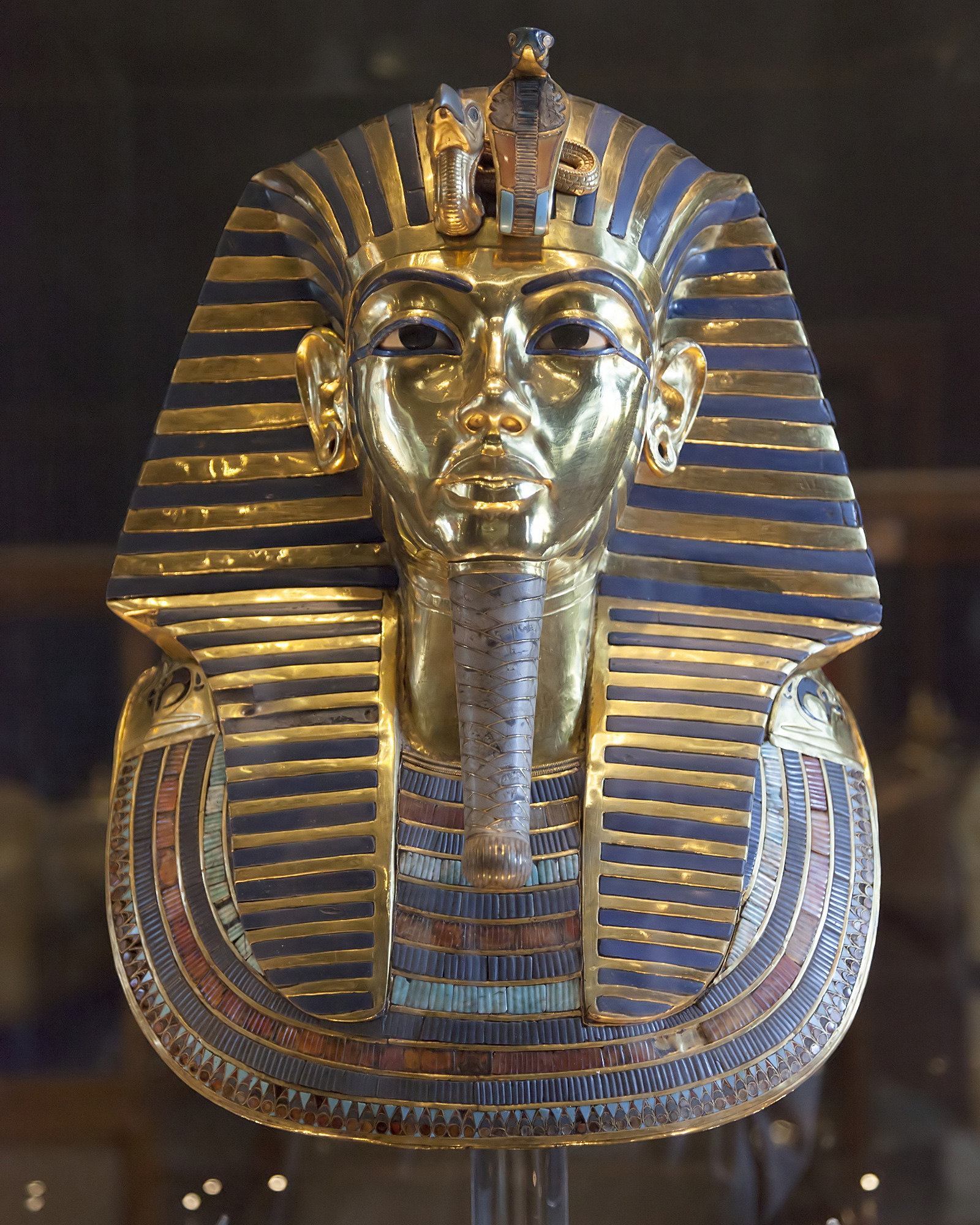
The funerary mask of Tutankhamun, ca. 1327 BCE

==== Ancient Egypt ====
Evidence suggests that Nubia had sporadic access to gold nuggets during the Neolithic and Prehistoric periods. Gold mining in Egypt involved both surface mining, such as panning for gold in riverbeds, and underground mining, where tunnels were dug to extract gold-bearing quartz veins. During the Bronze Age, sites in the Eastern Desert became a great source of gold for nomadic Nubians, who used two-handed mallets and grinding ore extraction. By the Old Kingdom, the oval mallet was introduced for mining. By the Middle Kingdom, stone mortars to process ores and a new gold-washing technique were introduced. During the New Kingdom, Nubian mining expanded under Egyptian occupation with the invention of the grinding mill.

Ancient Egypt may have used gold mining as a form of punishment following a judgment for breach of order, thus condemning slaves to endure this task indefinitely until they were exhausted and died.

Gold was associated with the sun god Ra and was believed to be eternal and indestructible, symbolising the pharaoh's divine power and afterlife. Gold has also been found in the tombs of Tutankhamun and other pharaohs.

==== Ancient Rome and Greece ====
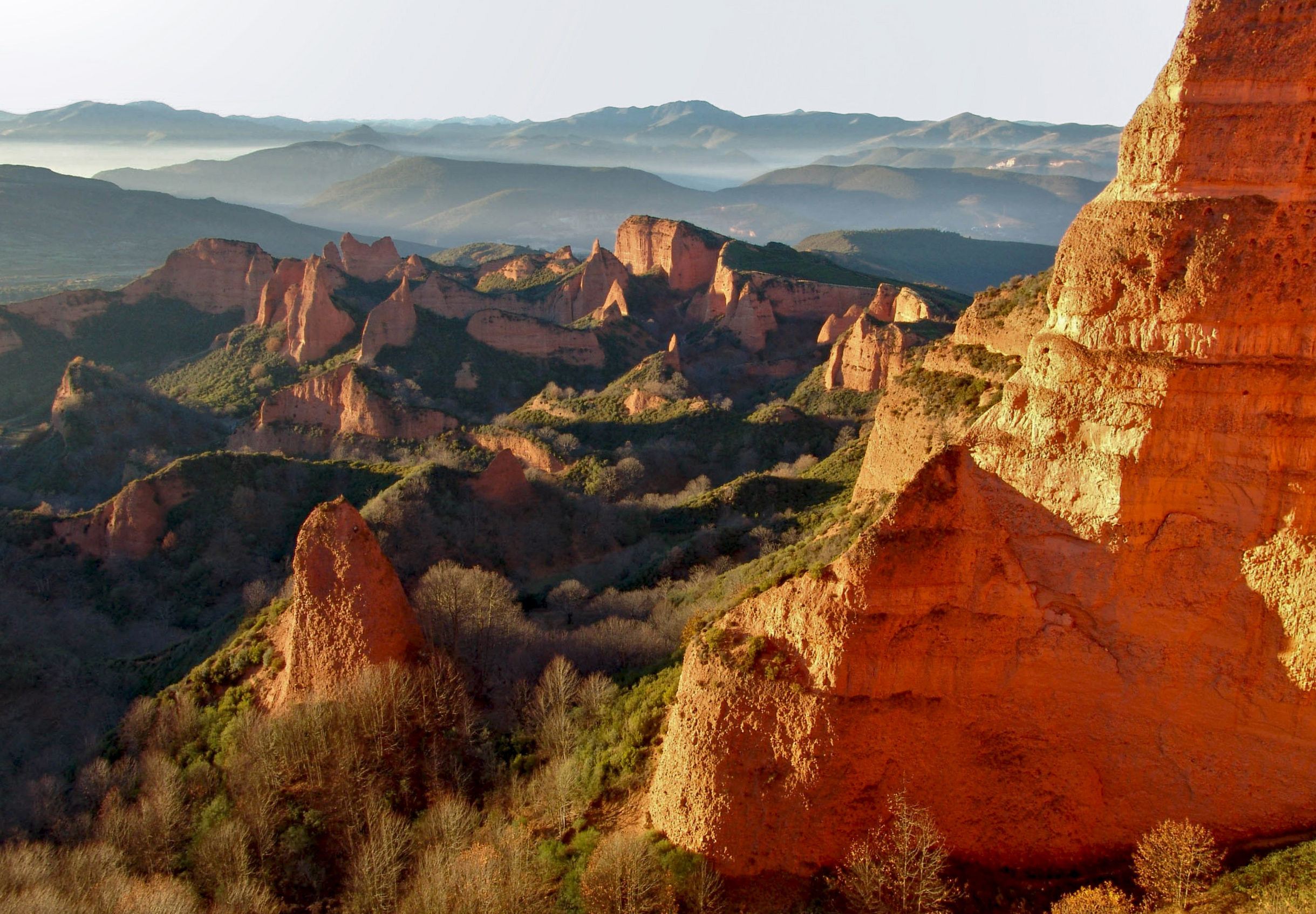
Landscape of Las Médulas, Spain, the result of hydraulic mining on a vast scale by the ancient Romans

During the Bronze Age, gold objects were also plentiful, especially in Ireland and Spain. Romans employed slave labour and used hydraulic mining methods, such as hushing and ground sluicing on a large scale to extract gold from extensive alluvial (loose sediment) deposits, such as those at Las Medulas. Mining was under the control of the state, but the mines may have been leased to civilian contractors later. Gold served as the primary medium of exchange within the empire, and was an important motive for the Roman conquest of Britain by Claudius in the first century AD, although there is only one known Roman gold mine at Dolaucothi in west Wales. Gold was a prime motivation for the campaign in Dacia when the Romans invaded Transylvania in what is now modern Romania in the second century AD. The legions were led by the emperor Trajan, and their exploits are shown on Trajan's Column in Rome and the several reproductions of the column elsewhere (such as the Victoria and Albert Museum in London). Under the Eastern Roman Empire during Emperor Justinian's rule, gold was mined in the Balkans, Anatolia, Armenia, Egypt, and Nubia.

==== Ancient Asia ====
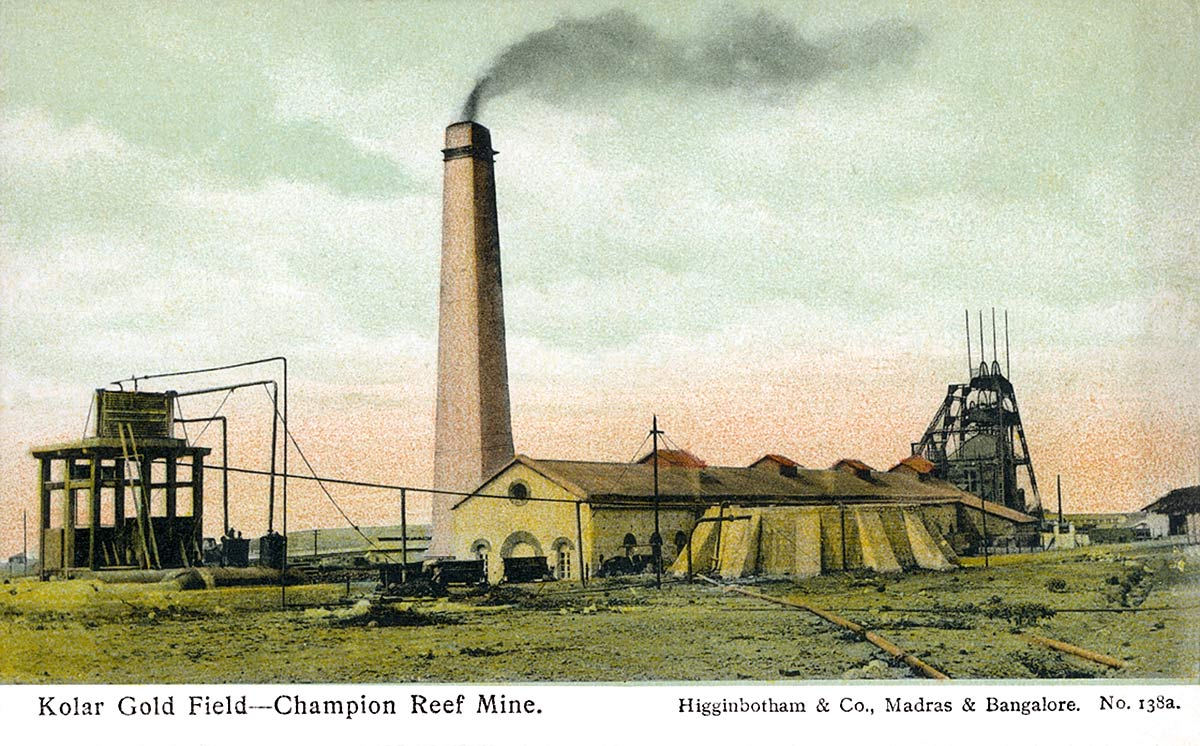
Kolar Gold Field - Champion Reef Mine, circa 1905

In India, in the Kolar Gold Fields (KGF) in Bangarpet Taluk, Kolar district of Karnataka state, gold was first mined before the 2nd and 3rd centuries CE by digging small pits. Golden objects found in Harappa and Mohenjo-daro have been traced to Kolar through the analysis of impurities – the impurities include 11% silver concentration, found only in KGF ore. The Champion reef at the KGF was mined to a depth of 50 m (160 ft) during the Gupta period in the 5th century CE. During the Chola Empire in the 9th and 10th centuries CE, the scale of the operation grew. The metal continued to be mined by the 11th-century kings of South India, during the Vijayanagara Empire from 1336 to 1560, and later by Tipu Sultan, the defacto administrator Mysore state, and by the British. It is estimated that the total gold production in Karnataka to date is 1000 tons.

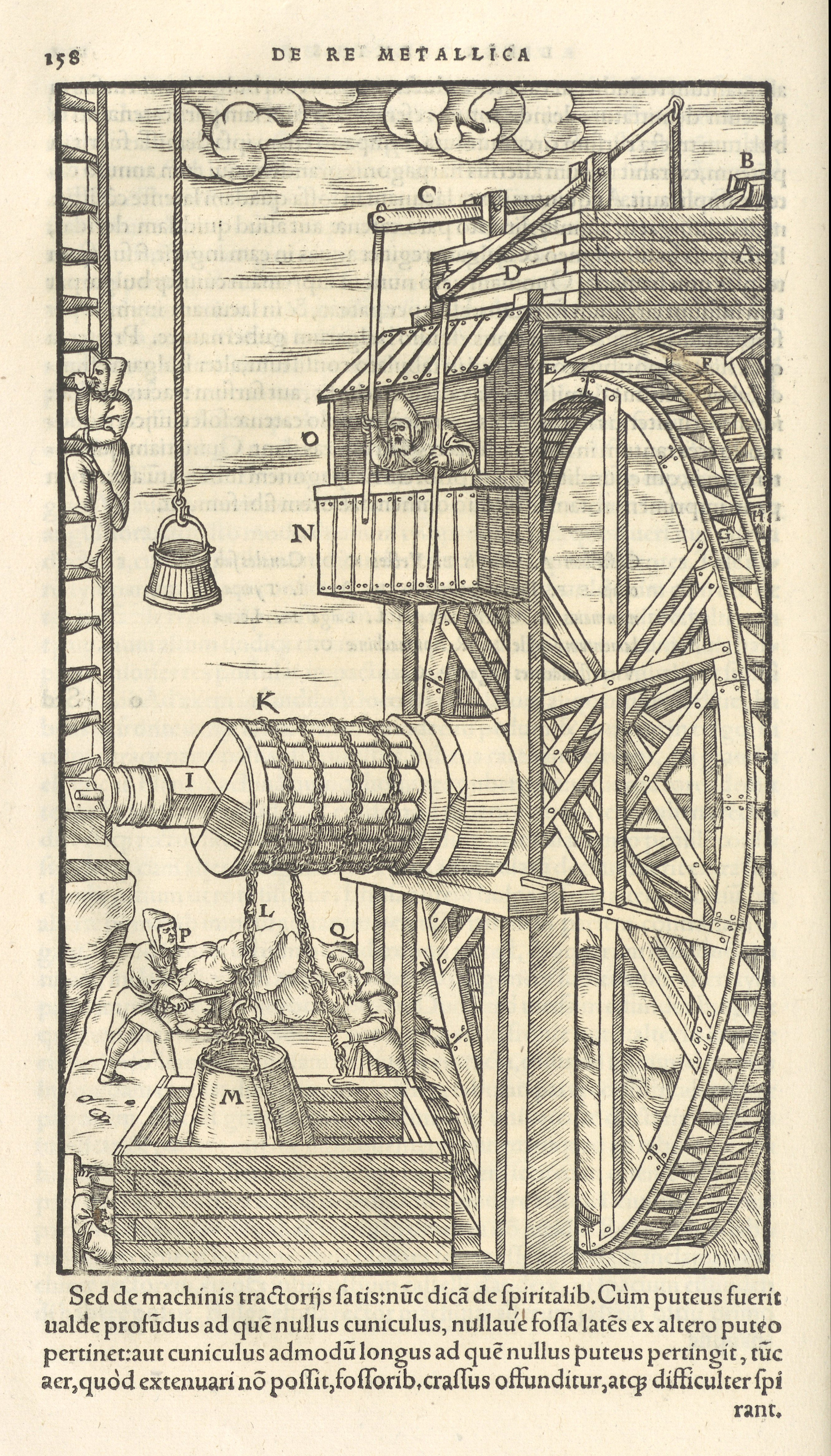
Late 15th and early 16th century mining techniques, De re metallica

==== Ancient South America ====
In South America, gold mining in the Andes dates back thousands of years, with the Inca empire employing extensive gold mining operations in regions such as present-day Peru and Ecuador. They used stone tools and simple mining techniques to extract gold from rivers, and surface deposits. streams,

=== Middle Ages: European gold rushes ===
During the Middle Ages, there were several gold rushes in Europe. These were often small-scale and localised, compared to gold rushes later in history.

==== Transylvania ====
There was a gold rush in the Kingdom of Hungary (present-day Romania), primarily in the region of Transylvania, during the medieval period. Transylvania was known for its rich mineral resources including gold, silver, and other metals. Miners in Transylvania used both surface and underground mining techniques to extract gold from alluvial deposits and veins. These methods included panning, sluicing, and rudimentary shaft mining.

==== Slovakia ====
The mining of the deposit in present-day Slovakia (formerly Hungary) primarily around Kremnica was the largest of the Medieval period in Europe.

==== Scotland ====
The Kildonan Gold Rush, primarily in the Scottish Highlands, occurred during the 16th and 17th centuries. Gold deposits were discovered in rivers and streams, leading to a surge in prospecting and mining activity. The Scottish Crown took an interest in gold discoveries, in the hope of aiding the kingdom's economy and revenue. King James IV of Scotland established a royal mint to produce gold coins from Scottish gold. The Scottish gold rush eventually waned due to factors such as the depletion of easily accessible gold deposits, harsh weather conditions, and the political instability at the time.

==== Wales ====
There was a gold rush in Wales, in the Dolgellau area of Gwynedd, during the 19th century. Gold deposits were discovered in Welsh mountains, with reports of gold being found in the Mawddach and Tryweryn rivers. By the mid-19th century, commercial mining operations had begun. Wales' gold gained popularity for its quality and rarity, leading to its use in royal jewellery for the British royal family.

=== Modern era ===
==== California gold rush ====
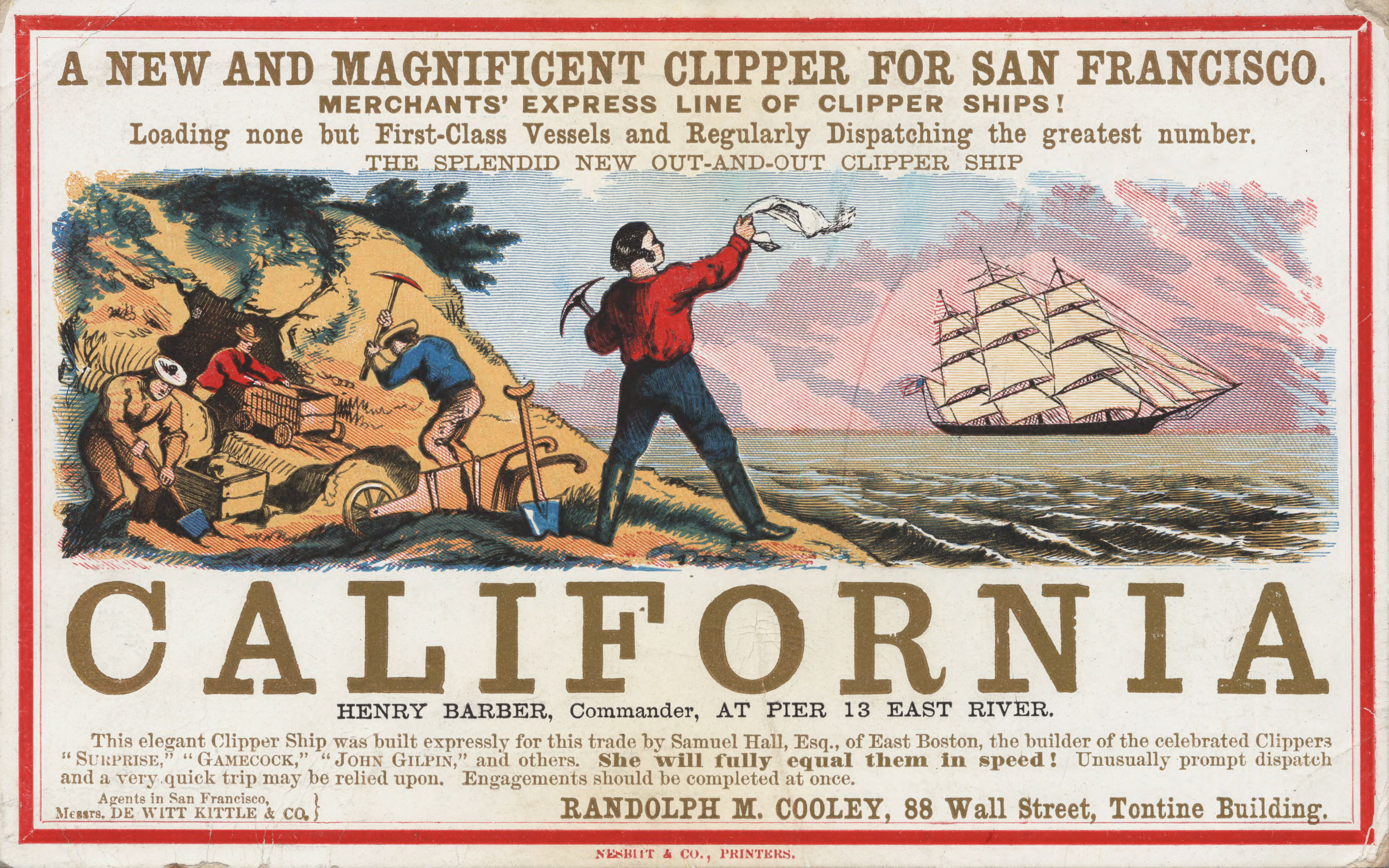
Sailing card for the clipper ship California, circa 1850, transporting fortune-seekers to San Francisco.

During the 19th century, numerous gold rushes in remote regions around the globe caused large migrations of miners, such as the California Gold Rush of 1849. This is one of the most famous gold rushes in history. The discovery of gold at Sutter's Mill in California sparked a massive migration of people from around the world to California in search of riches. The rush significantly accelerated westward expansion in the United States, California statehood and had profound effects on the region's economy and society.

==== Australian gold rushes ====
The gold rushes in Australia began in 1851 when Edward Hargraves, a prospector, discovered gold near Bathurst, New South Wales. The best-known gold rush in Australia was the Victorian gold rush. Thousands of people, known as "diggers", came to Australia from around the world in search of gold, which ultimately contributed to the growth of cities like Melbourne and Sydney.

==== South African gold rush ====
The discovery of gold in the Witwatersrand led to the Second Boer War and ultimately the founding of South Africa. This transformed the region into one of the wealthiest gold-producing areas in the world. This rush played a crucial role in the development of South Africa's economy and led to the establishment of Johannesburg, known as the 'city of gold'. Gold-bearing reefs in the neighbouring Free State province were found shortly thereafter, driving significant development in the region with the establishment of the Free State goldfields.

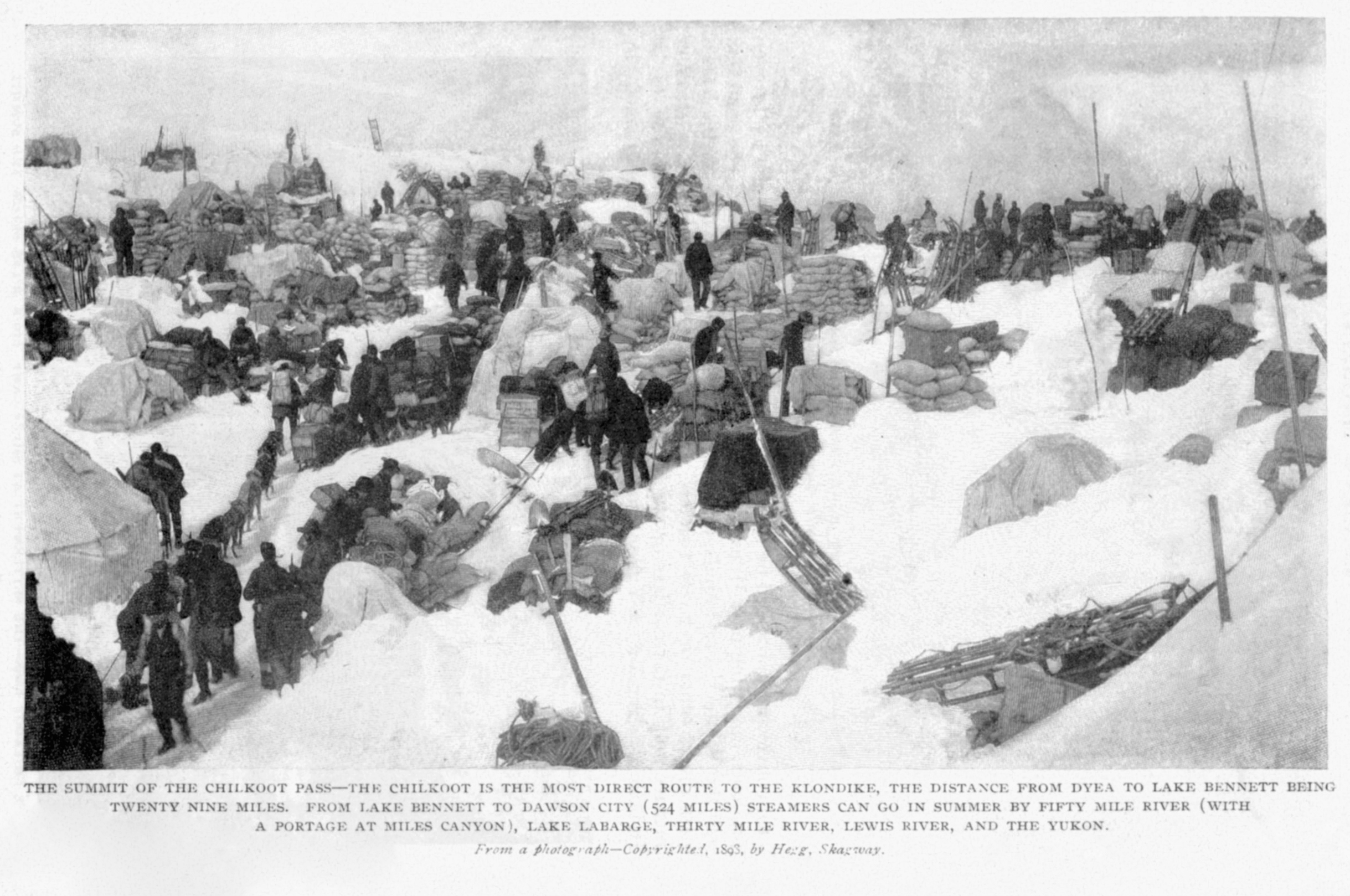
The Chilkoot Pass where Klondikers would establish themselves and their supplies.

==== Klondike Gold Rush ====
Also known as the Yukon Gold Rush, this brought prospectors from around the world to the Klondike region of the Yukon territory in Canada. The Klondike Gold Rush began in 1896, when gold was discovered in Bonanza Creek, a tributary of the Klondike River by George Carmack and his Indigenous companions, Skookum Jim Mason and Tagish Charlie. As prospectors arrived in Klondike, makeshift towns and settlements sprang up along the rivers, including Dawson City, which became the largest town in Yukon at the height of the gold rush. Prospectors employed various mining techniques to extract gold from the Klondike's streams and riverbeds, including placer mining, dredging, and hydraulic mining.

==== The Carlin Trend ====
The Carlin Trend of Nevada, U.S., was discovered in 1961.

== Production trends ==
World gold production was 3,612 tonnes in 2022. As of 2026 the world's largest gold producer was China with 380 tonnes of gold mined in that year. The second-largest producer of gold was Russia where 310 tonnes was mined in the same year, followed by Australia with 290 tonnes. In 2023, the annual gold demand of 4,448 tonnes was 5% below that of 2022. The total gold demand in 2023 was the highest at 4,899 tonnes.

Despite its decreasing concentration in ores, gold production is increasing. This increase can be achieved through ever larger-scale industrial installations as well as innovations, especially in hydrometallurgy.

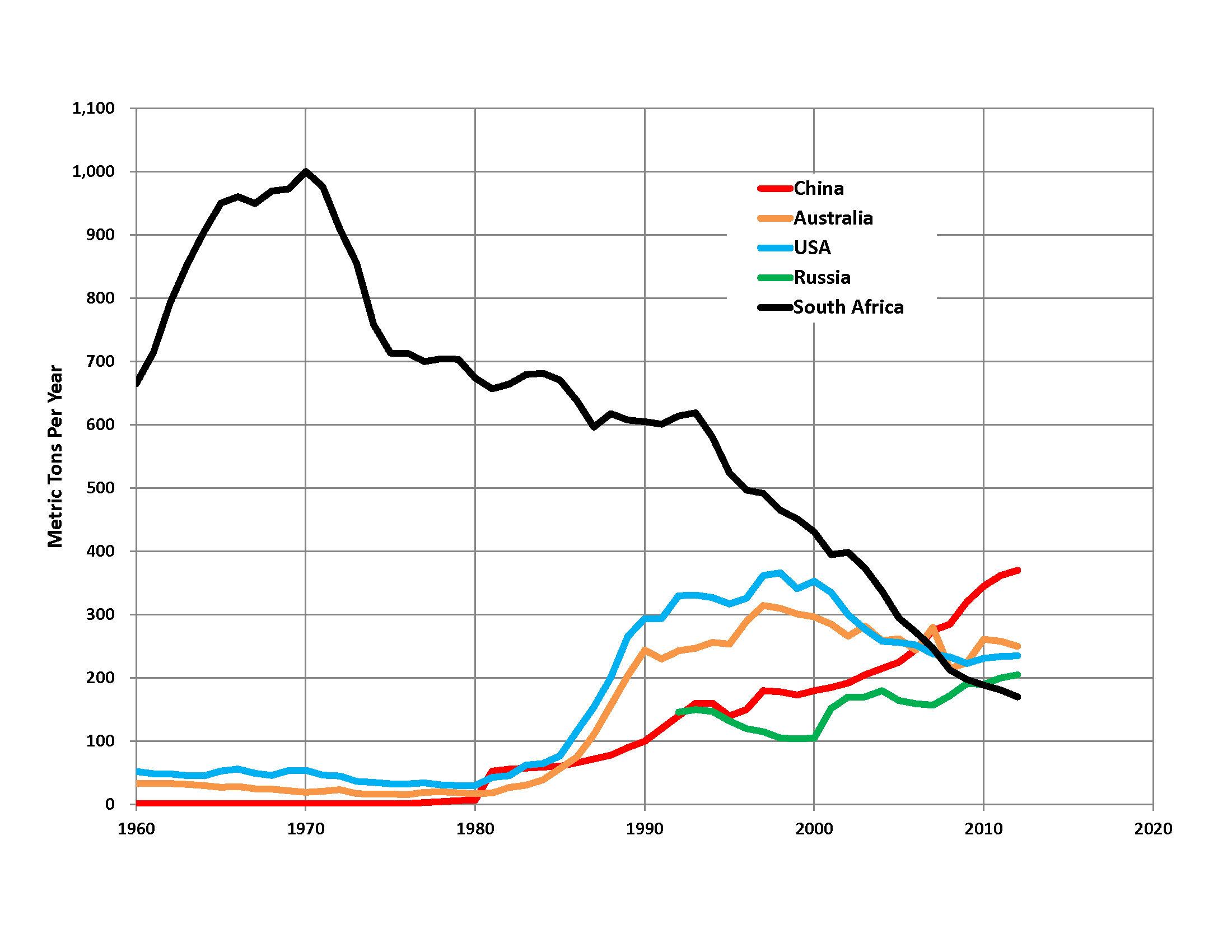
Trends in some gold-producing countries

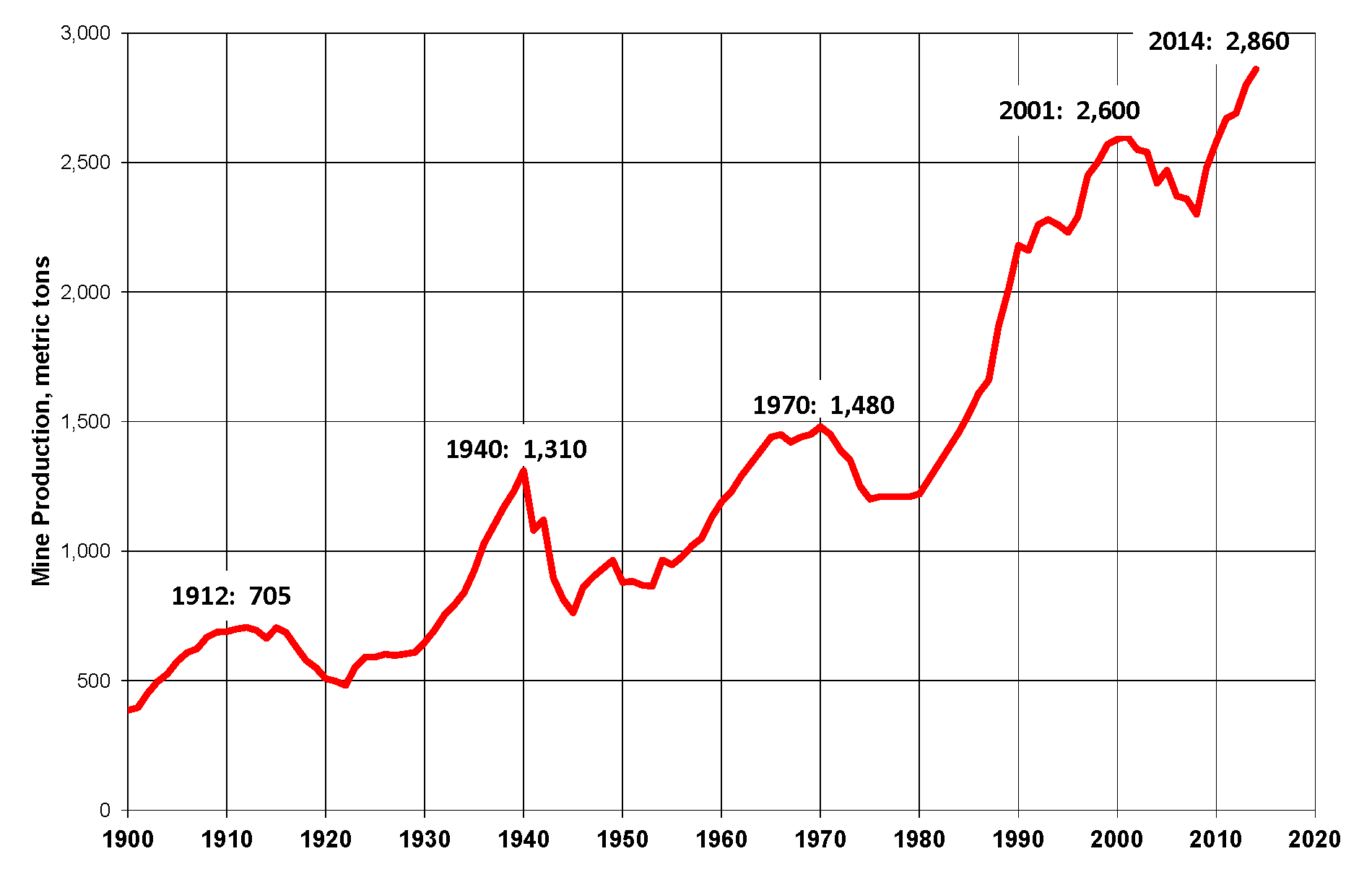
Annual world mined gold production, 1900–2014

Gold ore grade evolution

World gold demand (defined in terms of total consumption excluding central banks) in 2007 was 3,519 tonnes. Gold demand is subdivided into central bank reserve increases, jewellery production, industrial consumption (including dental), and investment (bars, coins, exchange-traded funds, etc.)

The supply of gold is provided by mining, official sales (typically gold by central banks), de-hedging (physical delivery of metal sold months before by mining companies on terminal markets), and old gold scraps. The total world supply of gold in 2007 was 3,497 tonnes. Gold production does not need to make up for gold demand because gold is a reusable resource. Currently, yearly gold mining produces 2% of the existing above-ground gold which is 158,000 tonnes (as of 2006). In 2008, gold mining produced 2,400 tonnes of gold, official gold sales close to 300 tonnes, and dehedging (physical delivery of metal sold months before by mining companies on terminal markets) close to 500 tonnes.

World mined gold production has peaked four times since 1900: in 1912, 1940, 1971, and 2001, with each peak being higher than previous peaks. The latest peak was in 2001, when production reached 2,600 metric tons, then declined for several years. Production started to increase again in 2009, spurred by high gold prices, and achieved record new highs each year from 2011 through 2015, when production reached 3,100 tonnes. Early estimates of 2016 gold production indicate that it was flat to 2015 production, at 3,100 tonnes.

In 2009, Barrick CEO Aaron Regent claimed that global production had peaked in 2000. Barrick's production costs have been "trending down" despite this peak, reaching $465 per troy ounce ($15.0/g).

In July 2012, Natural Resource Holdings CEO Roy Sebag wrote a report entitled "2012 World Gold Deposit Ranking" claiming that gold production would peak between 2022 and 2025 due to the markedly lower grades and remote locations of the remaining known undeveloped deposits.

Charles Jeannes, the CEO of Goldcorp, the world's largest gold miner by market capitalization, stated in September 2014 that peak gold would be reached in either 2014 or 2015.

Improvements in mining technologies can increase the production of gold and reduce the required gold grades.

== Methods ==
=== Hard rock mining ===
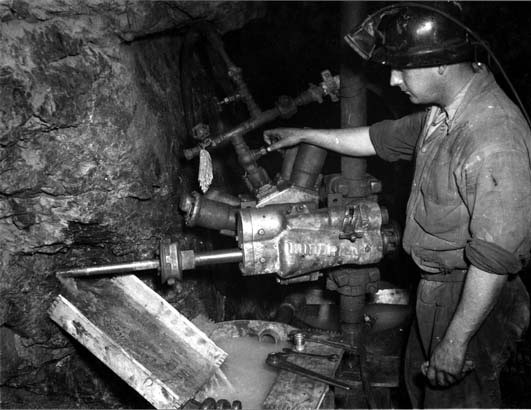
Hard rock mining at Kalgoorlie, Australia, 1951

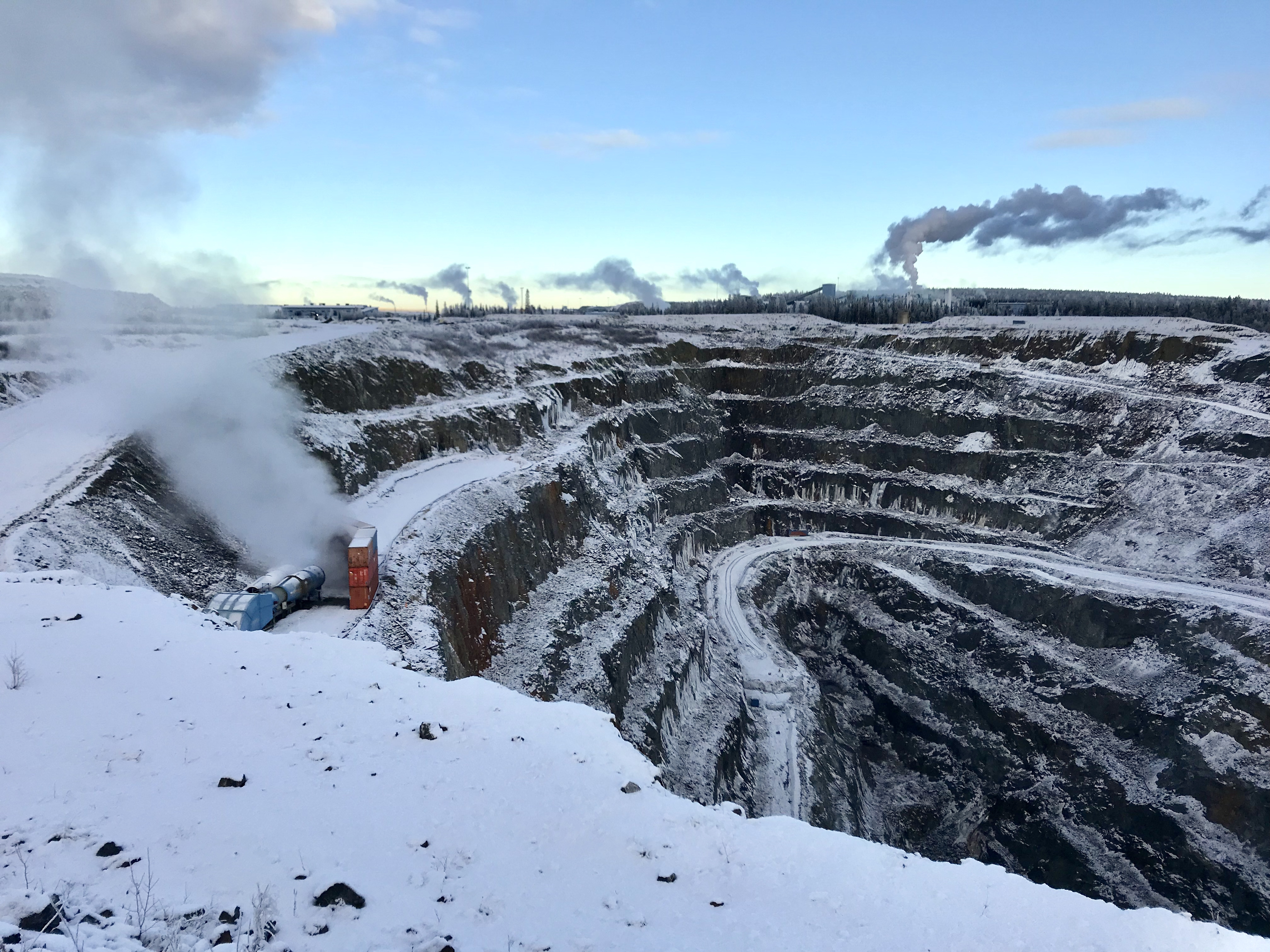
A large open-pit gold mine in Kittilä, Finland, in 2017

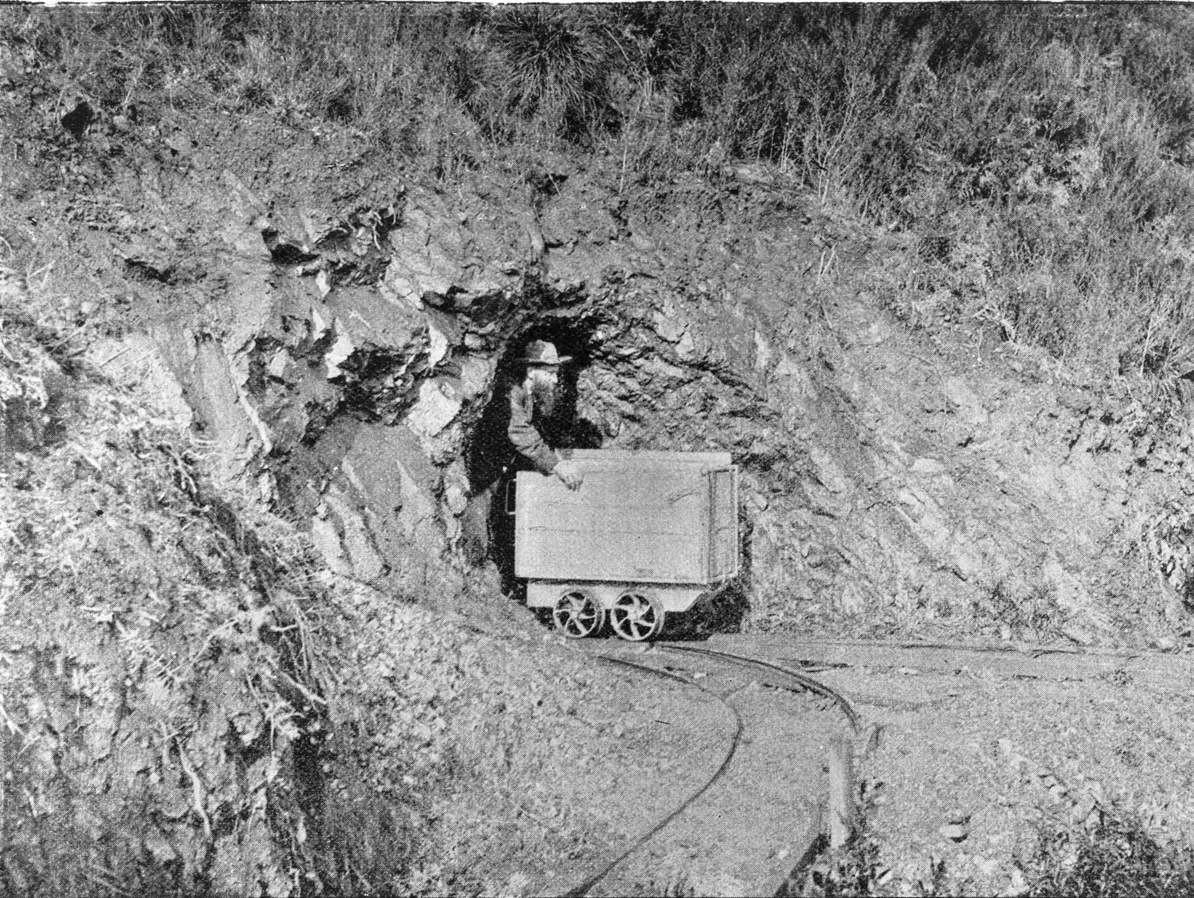
Gold mining in Coromandel Peninsula, New Zealand, in the 1890s

Hard rock mining extracts gold encased in rock, rather than fragments in loose sediment, and produces most of the world's gold. Sometimes open-pit mining is used, such as at the Fort Knox Mine in central Alaska. Barrick Gold Corporation has one of the largest open-pit gold mines in North America located on its Goldstrike mine property in north eastern Nevada. Other gold mines use underground mining, where the ore is extracted through tunnels or shafts. South Africa has the world's deepest hard rock gold mine, up to 3,900 metres (12,800 ft) underground. At such depths, the heat is unbearable for humans, and air conditioning is required for the safety of the workers. The first such mine to receive air conditioning was Robinson Deep, at that time the deepest mine in the world for any mineral.

=== By-product gold mining ===
Gold is also produced by mining in which it is not the principal product. Large copper mines, such as the Bingham Canyon mine in Utah or the Panguna mine in Bougainville, often recover considerable amounts of gold and other metals along with copper. Sand and gravel pits, like those in Denver (Colorado), may recover small amounts of gold in their wash operations. The largest producing gold mine in the world, the Grasberg mine in Papua, Indonesia, is primarily a copper mine.

=== Niche, recreational, or historical methods ===
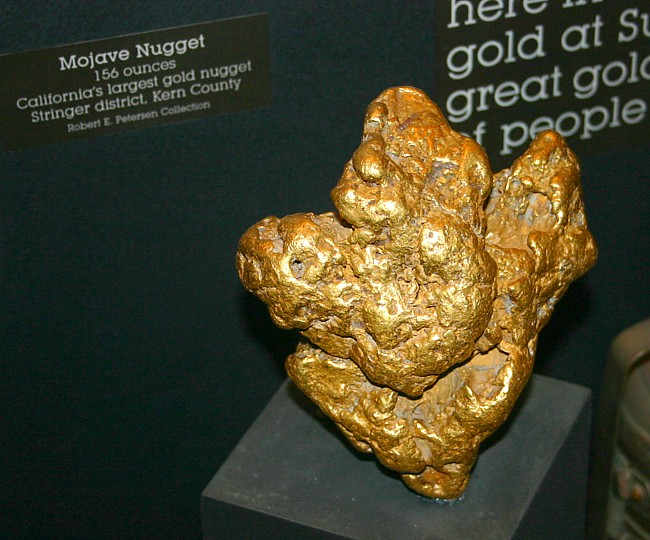
This 156-troy-ounce (4.9 kg) gold nugget, known as the Mojave Nugget, was found by an individual prospector in the Southern California desert using a metal detector.

Recreational gold mining and prospecting has become a popular outdoor activity in several countries, including New Zealand (particularly in Otago), Australia, South Africa, Wales (at Dolaucothi and in Gwynedd), Canada and the United States especially. Recreational mining is typically small-scale placer mining but has been challenged for environmental reasons. The disruption of historic gold placer deposits poses risks of reintroducing pollutants from past mining activities, such as mercury remaining in mine deposits and tailings.

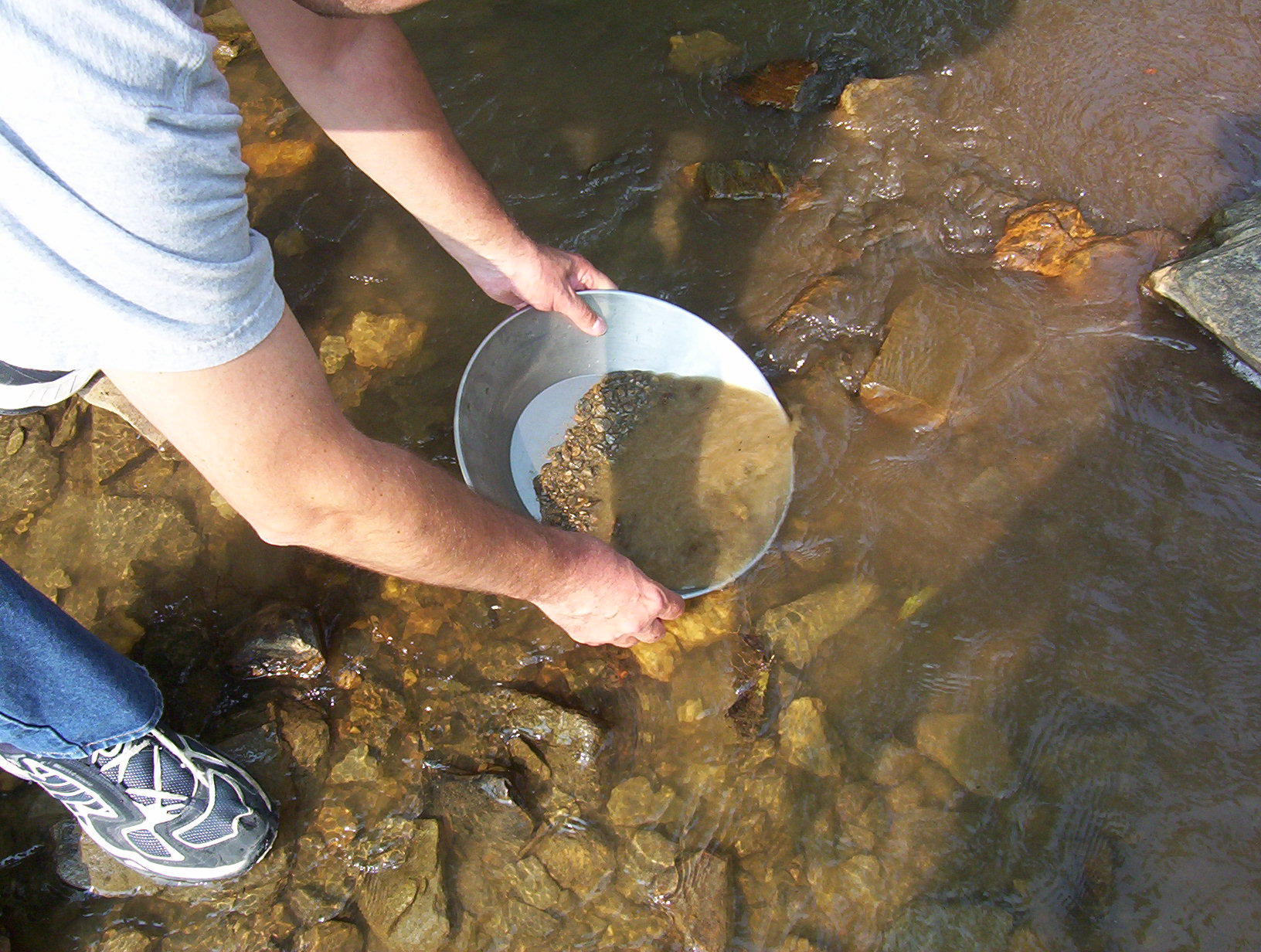
Panning for gold in a creek bed

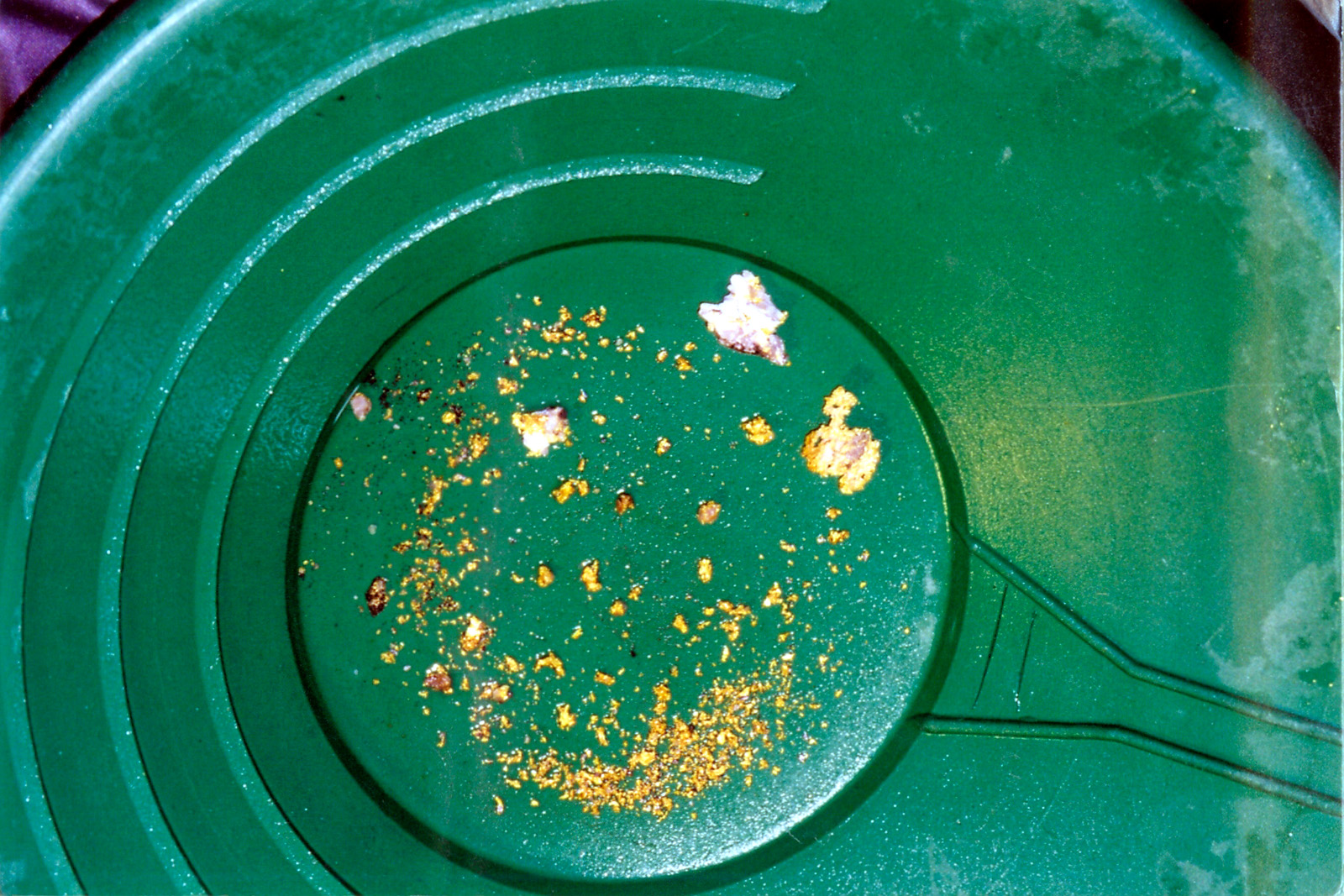
Gold in the pan, Alaska

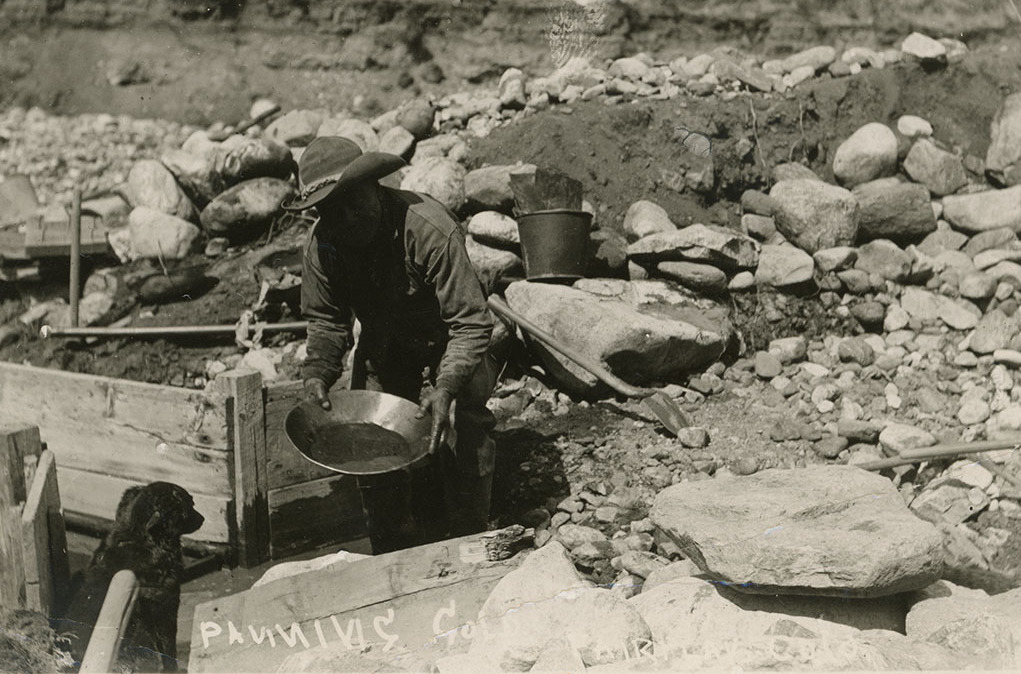
Man gold panning in Fairplay, Colorado early 1900s with dog

Gold panning, or simply panning, is a form of placer mining and traditional mining that extracts gold from a placer deposit using a pan. The process is one of the simplest ways to extract gold, and is popular with geology enthusiasts especially because of its low cost and relative simplicity.

The first recorded instances of placer mining are from ancient Rome, where gold and other precious metals were extracted from streams and mountainsides using sluices and panning (ruina montium).

However, the productivity rate is comparatively smaller compared to other methods such as the rocker box or large extractors, such as those used at the Super Pit gold mine, in Kalgoorlie, Western Australia, which has led to panning being largely replaced in the commercial market.

Asteroid mining of gold has been proposed.

==== Placer mining ====
Placer mining is a method of extracting gold from alluvial deposits such as sand, gravel, and sediment. These are known as placer deposits which are typically found in riverbeds, stream beds, and floodplains. These deposits typically contain minerals that are resistant to weathering and eroision, like gold, platinum, and diamonds. They are characterized by their relatively high concentration of valuable minerals compared to the surrounding rock or sediments. Unlike hard-rock mining, which involves excavating solid rock formations, water or dredging is used to extract the gold.

===== Sluicing =====
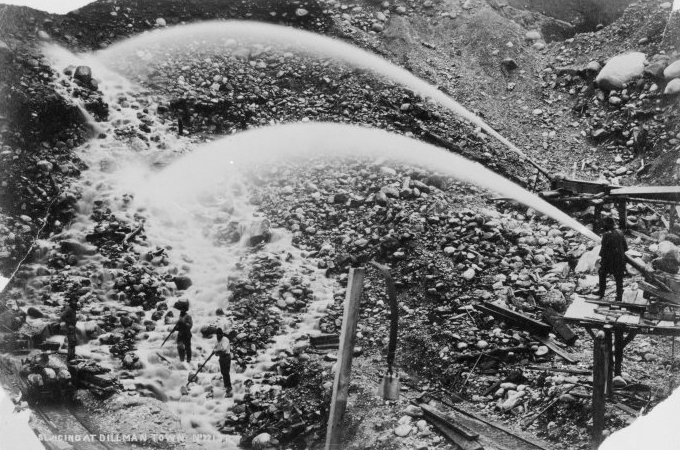
Gold sluicing at Dilban Town, New Zealand, 1880s

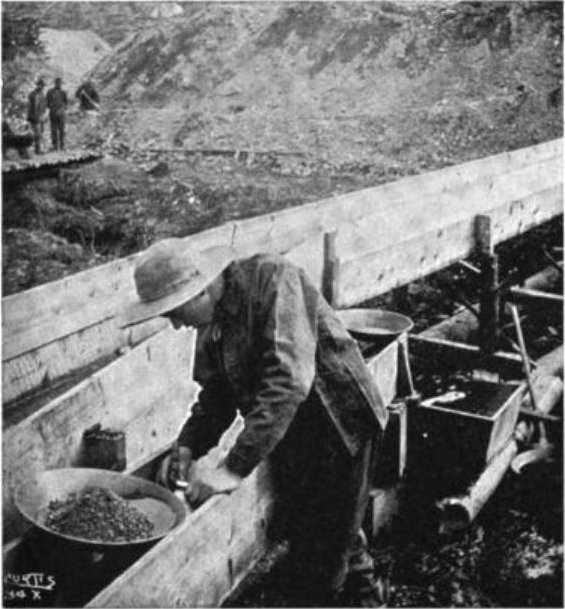
Taking gold out of a sluice box, western North America, 1900s

Using a sluice box to extract gold from placer deposits has long been a common practice in prospecting and small-scale mining. Sluices work on the principle that heavier particles will sink to the bottom of a stream, while those that are lighter will be carried downstream and expelled. A sluice box is essentially a man made channel with riffles set in the bottom. The riffles are designed to create dead zones in the current to allow gold to drop out of suspension. The box is placed in the stream to channel water flow. Gold-bearing material is placed at the top of the box. The material is carried by the current through the volt where gold and other dense material settles out behind the riffles. Less dense material flows out of the box as tailings.

Larger commercial placer mining operations employ screening plants, or trommels, to remove the larger alluvial materials such as boulders and gravel, before concentrating the remainder in a sluice box or jig plant. After the gold is sorted through trommels, it is placed through regular sluice boxes for further sorting. These operations typically include diesel powered, earth moving equipment including excavators, bulldozers, wheel loaders, and rock trucks.

===== Dredging =====
Although this method has largely been replaced by modern methods, some dredging is done by small-scale miners using suction dredges. These are small machines that float on the water and are usually operated by one or two people. A suction dredge consists of a sluice box supported by pontoons, attached to a suction hose which is controlled by a miner working beneath the water. This method is particularly popular in areas where gold is found at river bottoms or submerge deposits.

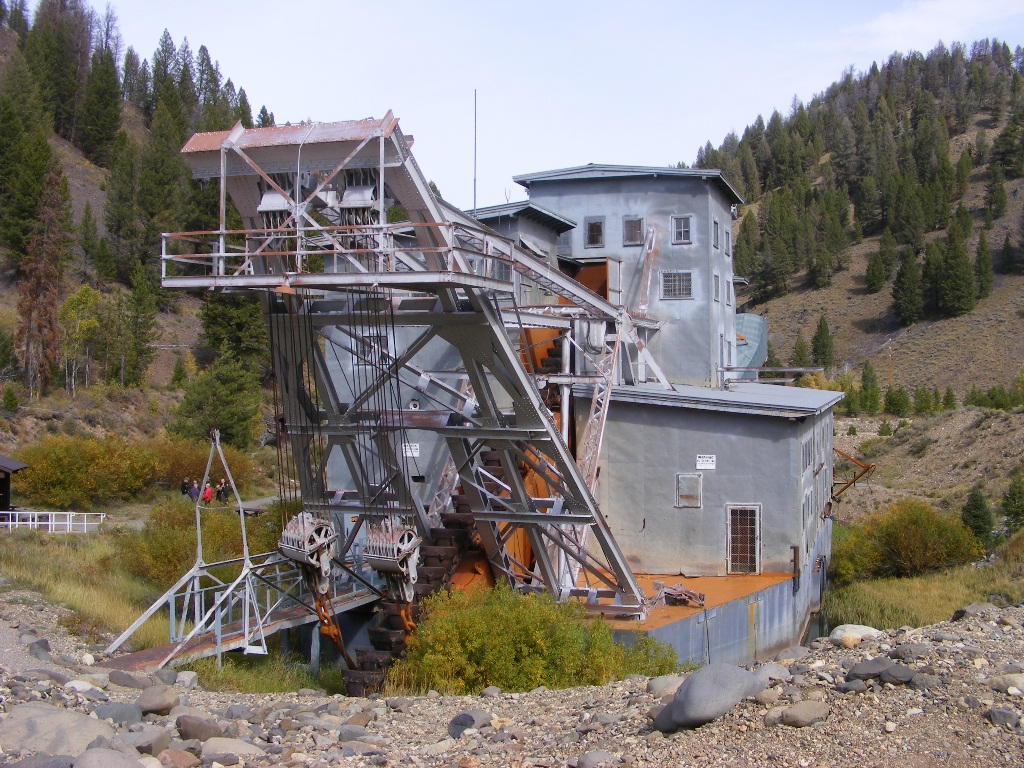
The Yankee Fork gold dredge in Idaho. It was powered by two 350 horse Ingersoll-Rand, 7 cylinder diesel engines, burning 400 to 500 gallons of fuel a day.

Suction dredging can have environmental impacts, moreso on aquatic habitats and water quality. Regulations and best practices are often in place to minimize these impacts. State dredging permits in many of the United States gold dredging areas specify a seasonal time period and area closures to avoid conflicts between dredgers and the spawning time of fish populations. Some US states, such as Montana, require an extensive permitting procedure, including permits.

Some large suction dredges [100 horsepower (75 kW) & 250 mm (10 in)] are used in commercial production throughout the world. Small suction dredges are much more efficient at extracting smaller gold than the old bucket line. This has improved the chances of finding gold. Smaller dredges with 50-to-100-millimetre (2 to 4 in) suction tubes are used to sample areas behind boulders and along potential pay streaks, until "colour" (gold) appears.

Other larger scale dredging operations take place on exposed river gravel bars at seasonal low water. These operations typically use a land based excavator to feed a gravel screening plant and sluice box floating in a temporary pond. The pond is excavated in the gravel bar and filled from the natural water table. "Pay" gravel is excavated from the front face of the pond and processed through the floating plant, with the gold trapped in the onboard sluice box and tailings stacked behind the plant, steadily filling in the back of the pond as the operation moves forward. This type of gold mining is characterized by its low cost, as each rock is moved only once. It also has low environmental impact, as no stripping of vegetation or overburden is necessary, and all process water is fully recycled. Such operations are typical on New Zealand's South Island and in the Klondike region of Canada.

===== Rocker box =====
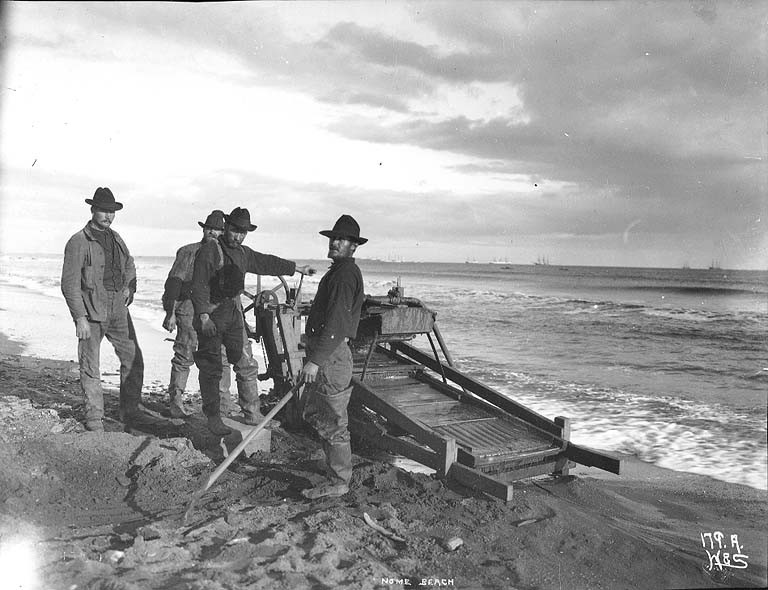
Four men using rocker boxes to mine for gold on Nome beach, Alaska, ca. 1900.

Also called a cradle, a rocker box uses riffles located in a high-walled box to trap gold in a similar manner to the sluice box. A rocker box uses less water than a sluice box and is well suited for areas where water is limited. A rocking motion provides the water movement needed for the gravity separation of gold in placer material. Rocker boxes gained popularity during the California Gold Rush in the 19th century and remain in use today. Although simple and inexpensive, it is not efficient as the previously discussed mining techniques.

== Gold ore processing ==
=== Cyanide process ===
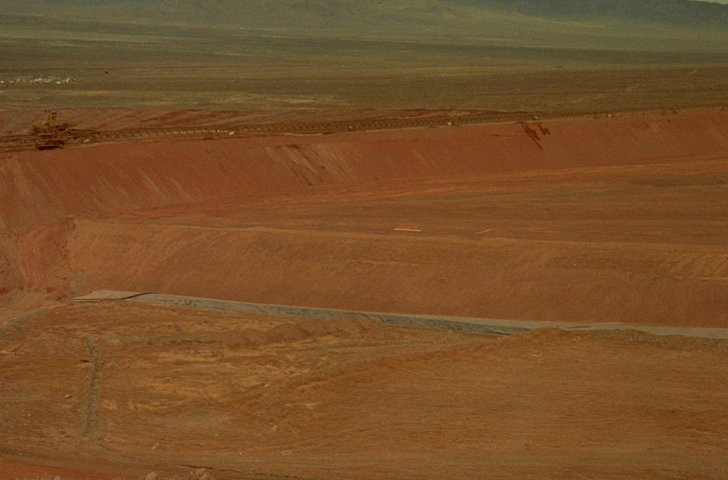
Cyanide leaching "heap" at a gold mining operation near Elko, Nevada. On top of the large mounds of ore are sprinklers dispensing a solution of cyanide.

The dominant method for refining gold is a cyanide extraction method, or gold cyanidation, introduced in the late 1800s. Cyanide forms stable complexes with gold, but is highly toxic and can contaminate water systems if not properly managed. This a metallurgical technique used to extract gold from lower grade ores by converting gold into a water-soluble coordination complex. Finely ground rock is treated with a solution of sodium cyanide. The extract is absorbed onto carbon and then removed from the carbon with a solution of caustic soda and cyanide. Gold cyanide is then converted to relatively pure gold through gold parting.

There are many environmental hazards associated with this extraction method, largely due to the high toxicity of the cyanide compounds. Furthermore, there are potentials for accidental spills or leaks to cause harm to aquatic ecosystems and human health. In 2000, the Baia Mare cyanide spill in northern Romania released approximately 100,000 cubic metres (3,500,000 ft^{3}) of waste water contaminated with heavy metal sludge and up to 120 long tons (122 t) of cyanide into the Tisza River.

=== Mercury process ===
Historically, mercury was used extensively in placer gold mining in order to form mercury-gold amalgam with smaller gold particles, and thereby increase the gold recovery rates. First, the gold ore is crushed and ground to a fine powder to expose the gold particles for amalgamation. Then this finely ground ore is mixed with liquid mercury to amalgamate it. Mercury forms an amalgam, an alloy, with gold particles to allow for the efficient capture of gold from the ore. The gold is concentrated by boiling away the mercury from the amalgam. This process is called retorting. This is effective in extracting very small gold particles, but the process is hazardous due to the toxicity of mercury vapour. Large-scale use of mercury stopped in the 1960s. However, mercury is still used in artisanal and small-scale gold mining (ASGM).

== Business ==
=== Small operations ===
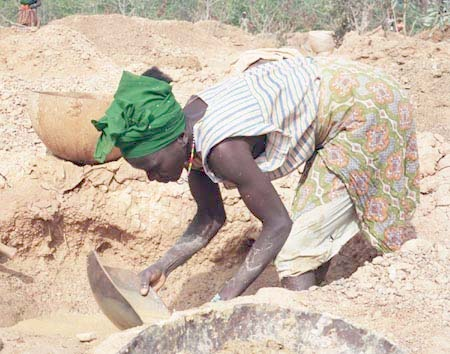
Woman panning for gold in Guinea

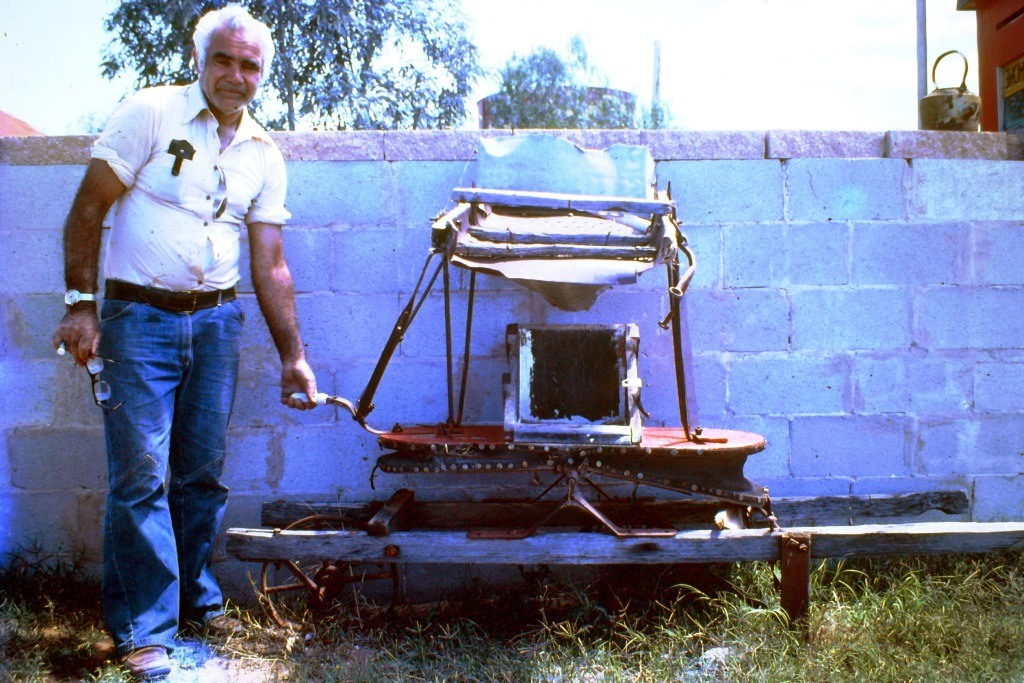
Old hand bellows on abandoned gold mine in western New South Wales, Australia

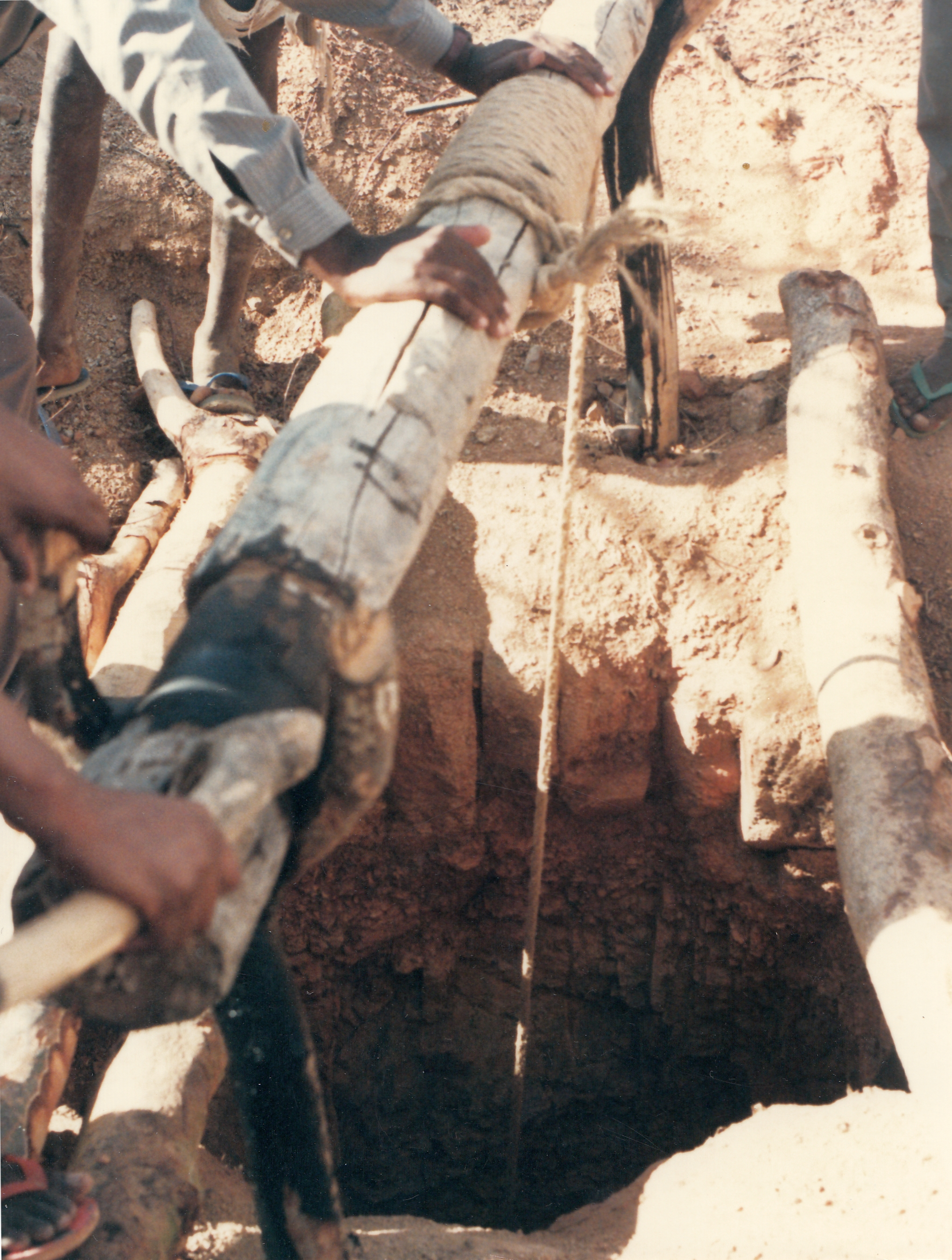
Artisanal subsurface mining in Tanzania

While most gold is produced by major corporations, there are an estimated 10 to 15 million small-scale artisanal gold miners worldwide. Around 4.5 million of them are women, and an estimated 600,000 children work in illegal artisanal gold mines. Artisanal miners use rudimentary methods to extract and process gold. Many of these people are mining to escape extreme poverty, unemployment and landlessness.

In Ghana, galamsey miners are estimated to number 20,000 to 50,000. In neighboring francophone countries, such workers are called orpailleurs. In Brazil, Venezuela, Suriname, and French Guiana, workers are called garimpeiros. These workers are not required to claim responsibility for their social and environmental impacts.

Miners risk government persecution, mine shaft collapses, and toxic poisoning from unsafe chemicals used in processing, such as mercury. In Ghana during 2009, the Dompoase mine collapse killed 18 workers. It was the worst mining disaster in Ghanaian history.

Children in these mines suffer extremely harsh working conditions and various hazards such as collapsing tunnels, explosions, and chemical exposure. Children may be especially vulnerable to these hazards and many suffer from serious respiratory conditions, hearing, and vision problems.

=== Large companies ===
Gold mining by large multi-national corporations produces about 80% of the gold supply. Most gold is mined in developing nations. Large mining companies play a key role in globalisation of the economy by linking rich and poor companies. Newmont and Barrick Gold are the largest gold mining companies in the world, but there are many smaller corporations in the industry.

Local communities are frequently vulnerable to environmental degradation caused by large mining companies and may lack government protection or industry regulation. For example, thousands of people around Lega Dembi Mine are exposed to mercury, arsenic, and other toxins, resulting in widespread health problems and birth defects. Vulnerable communities may also lose their land to the mine. Some large companies have attempted to build local legitimacy through corporate responsibility initiatives and local development.

== Adverse effects and responses ==
=== Impact ===
==== Environmental impacts ====
Gold mining can significantly alter the natural environment. Gold mining activities in tropical forests are increasingly causing deforestation along rivers and in remote areas rich in biodiversity. Gold mining activities contribute to soil erosion, deforestation and destruction of aquatic/marine ecosystems in affected regions. Mining has increased rainforest loss up to 70 km (43 mi) beyond lease boundaries, causing nearly 11,670 km^{2} (4,510 mi^{2}) of deforestation between 2005 and 2015. Up to 9% of gold mining occurs outside of these regulated lease boundaries. Other gold mining impacts, particularly in aquatic systems with residual cyanide or mercury (used in the recovery of gold from ore), can be highly toxic to people and wildlife even at relatively low concentrations. Illegal gold mining exacerbates the ecological vulnerability of the remaining forest ultimately leading to permanent forest loss. Gold mining clears native forests for mineral extraction, but also indirectly facilitates access to more land and further clearing. Rainforest recovery rates are the lowest ever recorded for tropical forests, with there being little to no tree regeneration at abandoned mining camps, even after several years. Gold mining can generate approximately 16,000 kg of CO2 equivalent emissions per kilogram of gold produced. The Amazon rainforest is at risk for 'savannization', which is the gradual transformation of a tropical rainforest into a savannah. This would ultimately lead to a collapse of biodiversity, ecosystems, and climate.

Gold mining produces more waste than mining of other minerals, because it can be mined at a lower grade. Gold mining generates roughly 3 million kilogrammes of waste rock for every 1 kilogramme of gold produced. Gold mining is a major source of heavy metal contamination, releasing elements such as arsenic, mercury and lead into surrounding ecosystems via tailings. These toxins can pose health risks for local communities. Arsenic is typically found in gold-containing ores, and gold processing may contaminate groundwater or the atmosphere. This pollution may persist for decades. Furthermore, mining operations use large quantities of water for processing ore and can result in the contamination of water sources with heavy metals, such as mercury and cyanide, used in the extraction process. This pollution can have detrimental effects on aquatic ecosystems and human health. Soil degradation has also been found to be impacted by gold mining. Mining activities can disturb soil structure, leading to erosion, sedimentation of waterways, and loss of fertile land for agriculture or vegetation regrowth. More evidently, dust and emissions from mining machiner and processing facilities can contribute to air pollution, impacting air quality and potentially causings respiratory problems for nearby communities.

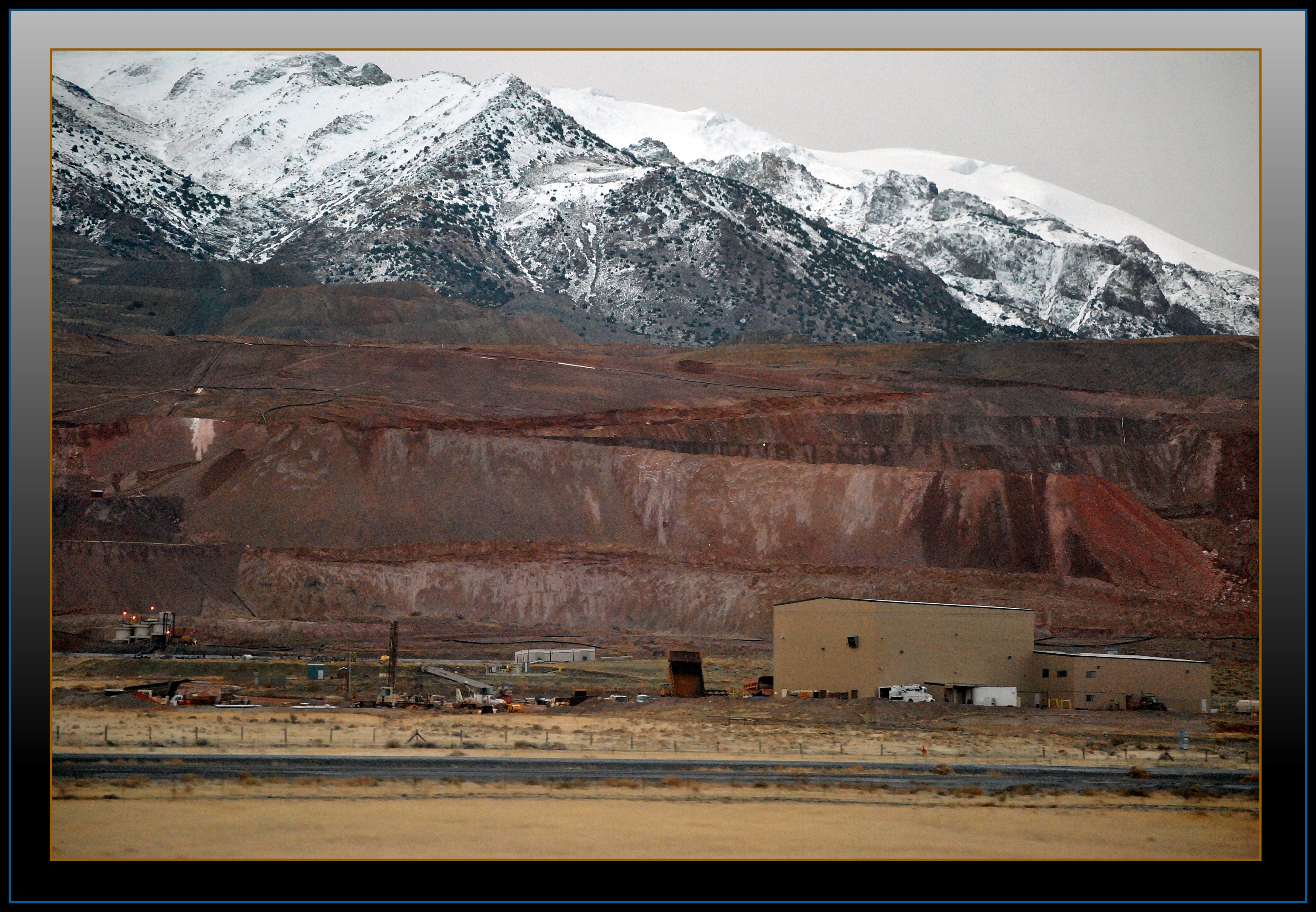
Lone Tree gold mine taken from the California Zephyr train, showing the extent of deforestation

==== Social and cultural impacts ====
Large-scale gold mining projects may require land acquisition and resettlement of local communities, leading to displacement, loss of livelihoods, and disruption of traditional ways of life. In addition to the possible respiratory problems that could be acquired, individuals may be exposed to hazardous chemicals used in gold extraction such as mercury and cyanide. These chemicals pose risks to gold miners, communities, and wildlife, resulting in further medical problems involving neurological disorders and waterborne diseases.

Gold mining in some regions has been associated with conflicts over land rights, labour rights violations, and exploitation of vulnerable populations, including Indigenous peoples and artisanal miners. Mining activities can damage or destroy cultural heritage sites, artifacts, and sacred areas, further impacting cultural identities and heritages. In the Amazon rainforest, Indigenous peoples have been killed and had their rightfully owned land stolen from them. As a consequence of this, some have left the rainforest to move to cities which further puts them at risk to disease, homelessness, and poverty.

Artisanal gold mining is widespread across Africa, occurring in numerous countries including Ghana, Mali, Burkina Faso, Tanzania, Zimbabwe, and many others. For many individuals and communities in rural Africa, artisanal gold mining represents a critical source of income and livelihood, providing employment opportunities and economic support in regions with limited alternative options. Artisanal mining operations vary in scale, from individuals panning for gold in rivers and streams, to small groups working collectively in informal mining camps, often referred to as 'galamsey' in West Africa.

Human Rights Watch produced a report in 2015 that outlined some of challenges faced globally. The report notes that

Thousands of children in the Philippines risk their lives every day mining gold. Children work in unstable 25-meter-deep pits that could collapse at any moment. They mine gold underwater, along the shore, or in rivers, with oxygen tubes in their mouths. They also process gold with mercury, a toxic metal, risking irreversible health damage from mercury poisoning.

A UN investigation reported human rights abuses such as sexual exploitation of women and children, mercury poisoning, and child labor affecting communities where illegal gold production occurs. The reports said global buyers such as Switzerland, through which roughly two-thirds of global trade transits, need to ensure that human rights are respected throughout supply chains.

==== Economic impacts ====
Gold mining can create employment opportunities in mining operations and related sectors. However, these jobs may be temporary. The sector's reliance on fluctuating global gold prices can lead to economic stability for communities dependent on mining. The discovery of significant gold deposits in a region often sees a flood of resources and development, which lasts as long as the mines are economic. When goldfields begin to decline in production, local economies find themselves destabilised and overly reliant upon an industry that will inevitably abandon the region when gold deposits are sufficiently depleted; leaving the areas without proper rehabilitation.

In some instances, the 'resource curse' phenomenon may occur, where countries rich in natural resources, like gold, may experience economic challenges, corruption, inequality, and governance issues instead of sustained development. Despite the existence of several laws that regulate environmental crimes, illegal practices in mining tends to happen because of an absence of enforcement. The rules for gold mining create ambiguities between the types of 'legal' mining, leaving loopholes for those to exploit.

==== Global market impacts ====
Gold prices are subject to global market trends, economic uncertainties, and geopolitical factors. Fluctuation in gold prices can influence investment decisions, currency values, and trade balances in gold-producing and consuming countries. Furthermore, the global gold supply chain involves complex networks of mining companies, refineries, traders, and retailers. Ensuring ethical and sustainable practices throughout this supply chain, including addressing issues such as child labour and environmental degradation, remains a challenge.

=== Responses ===
Fairtrade and Fairmined dual certification for gold was launched across the United Kingdom on 14 February 2011, a joint scheme between The Fairtrade Foundation and The Association for Responsible Mining. The Fairmined mark ensures that the gold has been extracted in a fair and responsible manner. The "No Dirty Gold" campaign, working with a number of campaigning partners, was established in 2004 and aims "to ensure that gold mining operations respect human rights and the environment" through a call for changes in gold mining techniques and processes. The impacts of mining on the environment are long-lasting, and active land management and restoration are needed to ensure recovery. A barrier to the restoration of environments is cost. Limited funding is a major barrier in implementing commitments. Restoration costs vary widely between different approaches, such as passive and active restoration. Some regulations can incentivize formalization of artisanal mining, increase gold production, manage environmental impacts, and direct mining away from ecologically sensitive areas.

== See also ==
- Sibanye Gold
- Gold extraction
- Gold rush
- Gold prospecting
- Ore genesis
- Quartz reef mining
- Recreational gold mining
- List of gold nuggets by size

Gold mining by country:

- Mining industry of South Africa
  - Witwatersrand & Witwatersrand Basin around Johannesburg
    - Qala Shallows Gold Mine
- Deepest mines
- Gold mining in Brazil
- Gold mining in Africa
  - Gold mining in South Africa
- Gold mining in Australia
- Gold mining in the United States
  - Gold mining in Alaska
- City of Gold in Canada
- Gold mining in China
- Gold mining in India
  - Hatti Gold Mines
  - Kolar Gold Fields
- Gold mining in Guyana
  - Aurora gold mine
  - Omai mine
  - Toroparu mine
- Gold mining in Pakistan:
  - Reko Diq Mine
  - Saindak Copper Gold Project
- Welsh gold
- Sukari, Egypt
- Gold mining in Switzerland
  - Gold mine Gondo
- Grasberg Mine in Papua, Indonesia

Gold rushes:

- United States:
  - Georgia Gold Rush (beginning 1828)
  - California Gold Rush (1848–1855)
  - Pike's Peak Gold Rush (1858–1860)
  - Holcomb Valley gold rush (1860s)
- British Commonwealth:
  - Australian gold rushes (1850s)
    - Victorian Gold Rush (1851–1860s)
  - Fraser Canyon Gold Rush (late 1850s), Canada
  - Witwatersrand Gold Rush (1880s), South Africa
  - Klondike Gold Rush (1896–1899), Canada
  - Otago gold rush (1860s), New Zealand
