= GPAA =

GPAA may refer to:

- Gold Prospectors Association of America
- Greater Pibor Administrative Area in South Sudan
