= Recreational gold mining =

Outdoor recreation

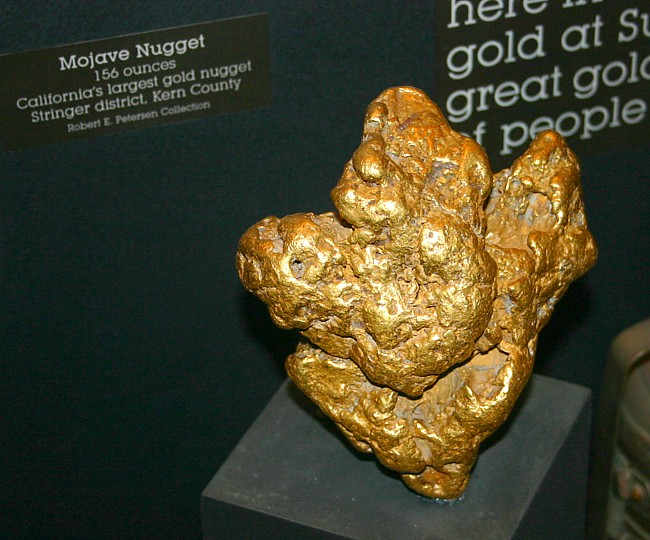
This 156-troy-ounce (4.9 kg) gold nugget, known as the Mojave Nugget, was found by an individual prospector in the Southern California desert using a metal detector.

Recreational gold mining and prospecting has become a popular outdoor activity in several countries, including New Zealand (particularly in Otago), Australia, South Africa, Wales (at Dolaucothi and in Gwynedd), Canada and the United States especially. Recreational mining is typically small-scale placer mining but has been challenged for environmental reasons. The disruption of historic gold placer deposits poses risks of reintroducing pollutants from past mining activities, such as mercury remaining in mine deposits and tailings.

== Australia ==
Australia does not prevent the private ownership of any minerals found in the land. At one time if individuals were to discover gold (or any other minerals) in their property, it would belong to the Crown, being the Australian Government and not to private entitlement. Today this is not so, and individuals can search and retrieve minerals with the acquisition of a miners permit that can be bought from the relevant Mining Department.

Today, recreational gold mining can be carried out in several areas such as Warrego near the town of Tennant Creek in the Northern Territory, Clermont in Queensland and Echunga Goldfield in Southern Australia. Each state has its own set of rules and regulations.

The largest nugget ever found was the Welcome Stranger of 2316 troy oz (74 kg).

== Japan ==
Within Japan recreational gold fossicking can be carried out in Hokkaido, Yamanashi and Michinoku. Within Hokkaido, placer gold can be found in the Usotan River, the Peichian River, the Yūbari River, and the Rekifune River. The traditional gold pan used in Japan is a rectangular concave shaped pan called the Yuri-ita (揺り板).

== Indonesia ==
With permission granted from the Indonesian Department of Tourism and the local village chiefs, fossicking for gold can be carried out in several regions that are accessible to international tourists. However, fossicking equipment is restricted to gold pans, shovels, and metal detectors. The use of sluices, dredges, or other machinery is forbidden.

== New Zealand ==
Seventeen areas in the South Island have been declared to be gold fossicking areas, allowing miners to fossick for gold without a permit. These areas are located in Nelson-Marlborough and the West Coast, Central Otago and South Otago. Alluvial gold can be found in low concentrations in all the fossicking areas.

== United Kingdom ==
Gold has been mined commercially in Wales (see Welsh gold) and Scotland. In the UK, gold prospecting can only take place with the explicit permission of the riparian owner, and any activities that cause or permit pollution of a watercourse, even re-suspended silt, could result in a criminal prosecution by the Environment Agency. There are locations where gold panning is a popular activity.

== United States ==
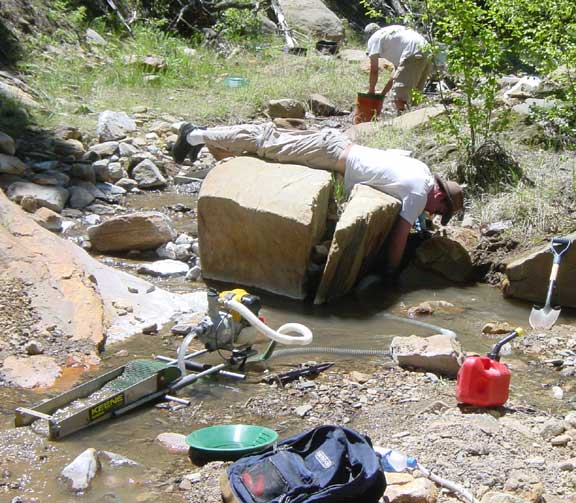
Weekend gold hunters, Gilpin County, Colorado.

Although gold deposits are popularly associated with the western US, gold has widespread occurrence across the country.

In the eastern US, a zone of lode and placer gold deposits extends in the Piedmont region from Alabama to Maryland. North Carolina, South Carolina, Georgia, Tennessee, Virginia and Alabama have many former gold mines and current prospecting sites. These states were the main source of US gold before the California gold discovery (see Gold mining in the United States). Recreational gold miners have also had success in the northeastern US.

Small amounts of gold have been found in streams draining glacial deposits in the Midwest.

Gold prospecting and mining activities allowed on public lands vary with the agency and the location. Gold pans and shovels are commonly allowed, but sluice boxes and suction dredges may be prohibited in some areas. There are public mining areas in many states, and prospecting may allow one to stake a gold placer claim or other type of mining claim in certain areas. Some public lands have been set aside for recreational gold panning. Some private land owners also give permission for small-scale gold mining.

The largest true California gold nugget, known as the "Dogtown Nugget", weighed 54 troy pounds (20 kg), and was found in Magalia, California. A 195-pound troy (73 kg) mass of gold mixed with quartz was also found.

Alaska has many sites for the prospector, both public and private.

== See also ==
- Gold prospecting
- Gold Prospectors Association of America
- Placer mining
- Recreational gold mining in Alaska
- Gold in California
