= Gold Prospectors Association of America =

The Gold Prospectors Association of America (GPAA) is an organization dedicated to finding and mining gold on a small or recreational scale. It has gold claims across America and members can work the claims for a yearly fee. As of December 2024, the club had over 200 places to find gold, making up more than 90,000 gold-bearing acres. The club is headquartered in Temecula, California. Most, if not all GPAA, activities are in the United States. The organization was founded in 1968 "to preserve and promote the great heritage of the North American Prospector." The association opposes mining methods that harm the environment and is against anti-prospecting bureaucracy. As of 2007, the GPAA is an independent company.

== See also ==
- Prospecting
- Gold prospecting
- Recreational gold mining
- Placer mining
