= Mojave Nugget =

Large gold nugget found in California

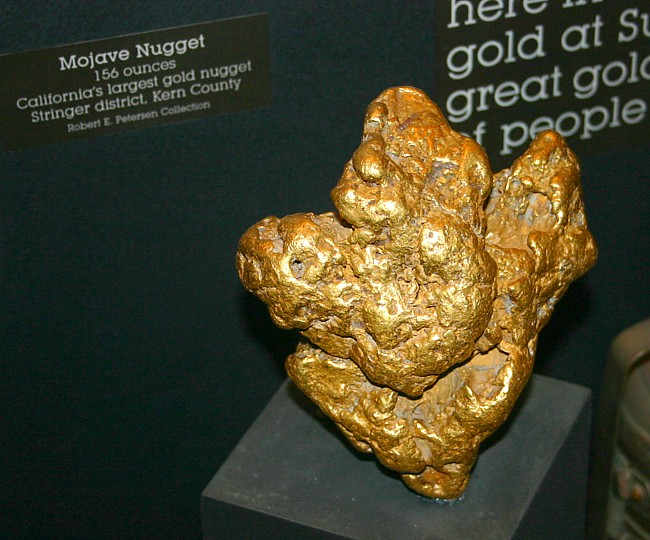
The Mojave Nugget

The Mojave Nugget is a large gold nugget found in California, United States. It was found in the Stringer district near Randsburg by prospector Ty Paulsen in 1977 using a metal detector. The nugget, which weighs 156 troy ounces (4.9 kg), is part of the Margie and Robert E. Petersen Collection of gold nuggets that was donated to the Natural History Museum of Los Angeles County. As of 2022, the bullion value of 4.9 kg of gold is approximately US$400,000. The collection contains 132 pieces of gold and has a total weight of more than 1,660 troy ounces (52 kg).
