= Sleeper Gold Mine =

Gold mine in Nevada, United States

Coordinates: 41.3338°N 118.0524°W

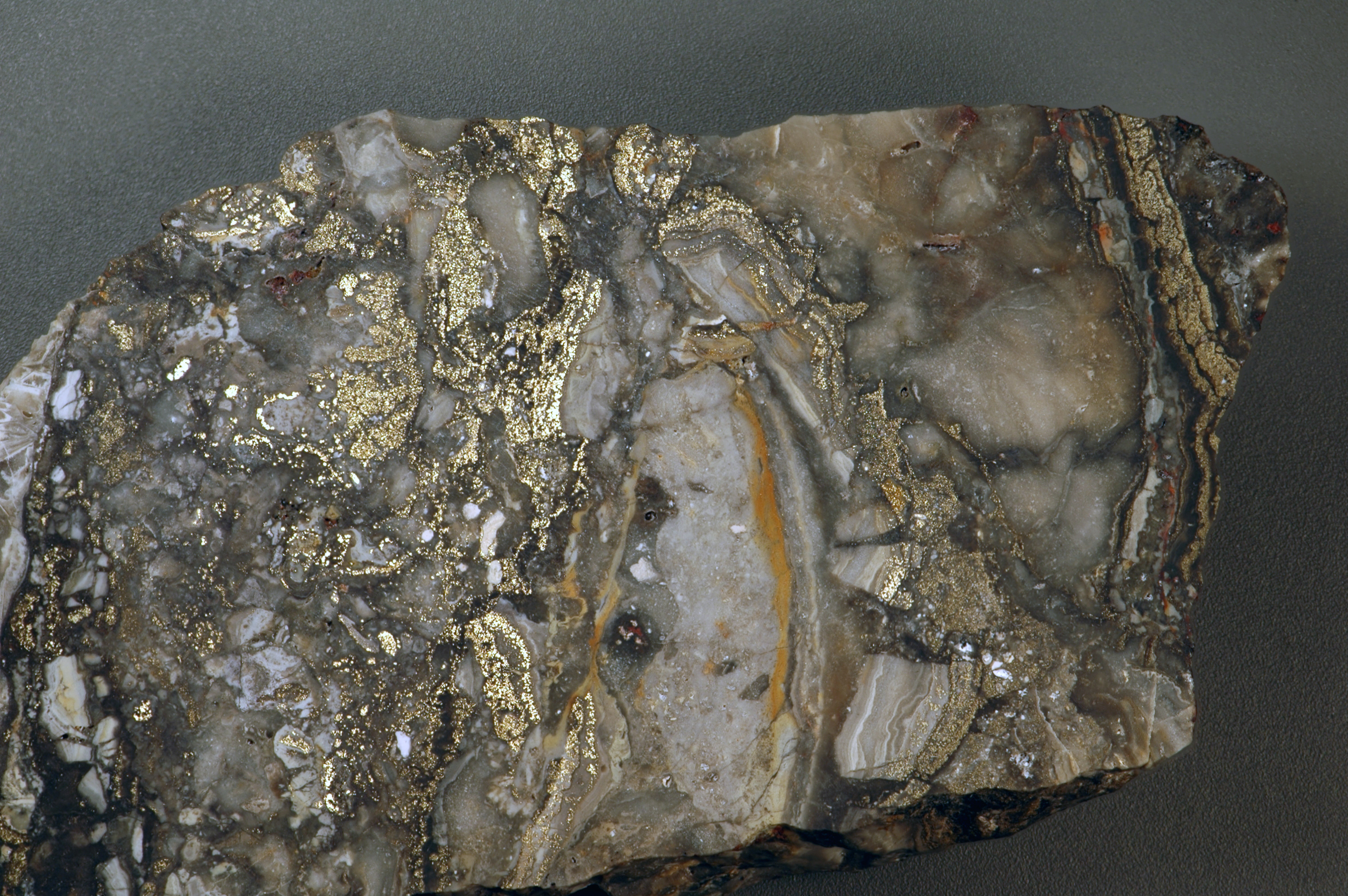
Bonanza gold ore from the Sleeper Mine, in brecciated quartz-adularia rhyolite.

The Sleeper Gold Mine was a high-grade gold mine operated by AMAX Gold from 1986 until 1996, producing 1.66 million ounces of gold and 2.3 million ounces of silver. It is located about 25 miles northwest of Winnemucca in Humboldt County, Nevada. This was an epithermal (hot springs) gold deposit, formed by volcanism during Basin and Range extensional tectonics. The Sleeper Rhyolite dates to 16.3-16.5 million years (latest Early Miocene), and the gold mineralization dates to about 14.3-15.8 million years (during the early Middle Miocene).

In 2026, the property was owned by Paramount Gold.
