= Companies listed on the New York Stock Exchange (S) =

== S ==
Stock name	Symbol	Country of origin
Safe Bulkers Inc.	SB	Greece
Salesforce.com	CRM	US
Sally Beauty Holdings	SBH	US
San Juan Basin Royalty Trust	SJT	US
Sanchez Energy Corporation	SN	US
SandRidge Energy	SD	US
Sanofi	SNY	France
Santander Consumer USA Holdings Inc.	SC	US
SAP SE	SAP	Germany
Sasol	SSL	South Africa
Saul Centers Inc.	BFS	US
SCANA	SCG	US
Scana Corporation	SCU	US
Schlumberger	SLB	US
Schweitzer Mauduit International, Inc.	SWM	US
Science Applications International Corporation	SAIC	US
Scorpio Bulkers Inc.	SALT	US
Scorpio Tankers Inc.	SBNA	US
Scorpio Tankers	STNG	Monaco
The Scotts Miracle-Gro Company	SMG	US
Scripps Networks Interactive	SNI	US
Seabridge Gold	SA	Canada
SEACOR Holdings	CKH	US
Seadrill	SDRL	Norway
Sealed Air	SEE	US
Seaspan Corporation	SSW	Marshall Islands
Seaspan Corporation	SSWN	China
SeaWorld Entertainment	SEAS	US
Select Asset Inc.	JBN	US
Select Asset Inc.	JBR	US
Select Income REIT	SIR	US
Select Medical	SEM	US
Selective Insurance	SGZA	US
Semiconductor Manufacturing International Corporation	SMI	China
Sempra Energy	SRE	US
Senior Housing Properties Trust	SNH	US
Sensata Technologies Holding N.V.	ST	Netherlands
Sensient Technologies	SXT	US
Sequans Communications S.A.	SQNS	France
Service Corporation International	SCI	US
ServiceNow	NOW	US
Sesa Sterlite Limited	SSLT	US
Shaw Communications	SJR	Canada
Sherwin-Williams	SHW	US
Shinhan Bank	SHG	South Korea
Ship Finance International Limited	SFL	Bermuda
Shutterstock	SSTK	US
Sibanye Gold Limited	SBGL	South Africa
Signet Jewelers	SIG	Bermuda
Silver Bay Realty Trust Corp.	SBY	US
Silver Spring Networks	SSNI	US
Silver Wheaton	SLW	Canada
Silvercorp Metals	SVM	China
Simon Property Group	SPG	US
Simpson Manufacturing Co., Inc.	SSD	US
Sinopec Shanghai Petrochemical Company Limited	SHI	China
Site Centers	SITC	US
Six Flags	FUN	US
SJW Corp.	SJW	US
SK Telecom	SKM	South Korea
Skechers	SKX	US
Skilled Healthcare Group, Inc.	SKH	US
SL Green Realty	SLG	US
SM Energy	SM	US
Smith & Nephew	SNN	United Kingdom
Snap-on	SNA	US
Sociedad Química y Minera	SQM	Chile
Solar Capital Ltd.	SLRA	US
SolarWinds	SWI	US
Solera Holdings	SLH	US
Sonic Automotive	SAH	US
Sonoco	SON	US
Sony	SNE	Japan
Sotheby's	BID	US
SouFun Holdings Limited	SFUN	China
Source Capital, Inc.	SOR	US
South Jersey Industries	SJI	US
Southcross Energy Partners, L.P.	SXE	US
Southern Company	SO	US
Southwest Airlines	LUV	US
Southwest Gas	SWX	US
Uncle Bob's Self Storage	SSS	US
Spansion	CODE	US
Sparton Corporation	SPA	US
Spectra Energy	SE	US
Spectra Energy Partners, LP	SEP	US
Spectrum Brands	SPB	US
Speedway Motorsports	TRK	US
Spirit AeroSystems	SPR	US
Spirit Realty Capital, Inc.	SRC	US
Sprague Resources LP	SRLP	US
Springleaf	LEAF	US
SPX Corporation	SPW	US
St. Joe Company	JOE	US
St. Jude Medical	STJ	US
STAG Industrial, Inc.	STAG	US
Stage Stores Inc.	SSI	US
StanCorp Financial Group	SFG	US
Standard Motor Products	SMP	US
Standex International Corporation	SXI	US
Stanley Black & Decker	SWK	US
Stantec	STN	Canada
Star Gas Partners LP.	SGU	US
L. S. Starrett Company	SCX	US
Startek Inc.	SRT	US
Starwood Property Trust, Inc.	STWD	US
State Street Corporation	STT	US
Statoil	STO	Norway
Steel Partners Holdings L.P.	SPLP	US
Steelcase	SCS	US
Stepan Company	SCL	US
Steris Corporation	STE	US
Sterling Bancorp	STL	US
Stewart Information Services Corporation	STC	US
Stifel	SF	US
Stillwater Mining Company	SWC	US
STMicroelectronics	STM	Switzerland
Stone Energy Corporation	SGY	US
Stonegate Mortgage Corporation	SGM	US
StoneMor Partners L.P.	STON	US
Stoneridge, Inc.	SRI	US
STR Holdings, Inc.	STRI	US
Strategic Hotel & Resorts, Inc.	BEE	US
Stride, Inc.	LRN	US
Stryker Corporation	SYK	US
Sturm, Ruger & Co.	RGR	US
Suburban Propane Partners LP	SPH	US
Sumitomo Mitsui Financial Group	SMFG	Japan
Summit Hotel Properties, Inc.	INN	US
Summit Midstream Partners, LP	SMLP	US
Sun Communities	SUI	US
Sun Life Financial	SLF	Canada
SunCoke Energy, Inc.	SXC	US
Suncor Energy	SU	Canada
SunEdison	SUNE	US
Sunstone Hotel Investors, Inc.	SHO	US
Superior Energy Services, Inc.	SPN	US
Superior Industries International Inc.	SUP	US
Supervalu Inc.	SVU	US
Swift Energy Co.	SFY	US
Swift Transportation	SWFT	US
SWS Group, Inc.	SWS	US
Symetra	SYA	US
Symmetry Medical Inc.	SMA	US
SYLA Technologies	SYT	Switzerland
Synnex	SNX	US
Synovus	SNV	US
Sysco	SYY	US
Systemax	SYX	US
