= List of gold mining disasters =

This is a list of gold mining disasters including environmental, such as those arising due to dam failure, cyanide leakage into the environment, as well as inappropriate environmental toxic waste discharge due to the gold cyanidation technique used in gold mining. Other disasters at gold mines such as those resulting in loss of life are also listed.

Year	Mine	Location	Majority Owner	Company Location	Details
1882	Creswick	Australia			New Australasian Gold Mine disaster: Australia's worst below-ground gold mining disaster.
1971	Certej Mine	Romania			1971 Certej dam failure: A dam failure resulted in the leak of 300,000 cubic metres of cyanide-contaminated flood Certeju de Sus, resulting in 89 deaths.
1984-2013	Ok Tedi Mine	Papua New Guinea	BHP	Australia	Ok Tedi environmental disaster: Unrestricted waste discharges from the mine had strong effects on the environment and the 50,000 people who live downstream. Over 2 billion tons of untreated mining waste were thus discharged.
1984-2013	Summitville mine	USA	Galactic Resources	Canada	A Canadian-based company used gold cyanidation process to extract gold, resulted in 610,000 m³ of stored toxic water. Following the company's bankruptcy, the US government spent over $155 million to clean the site.
1995	Omai mine	Guyana	Omai Gold Mines (subsidiary of Cambior)	Canada	3 million cubic metres of cyanide-tainted waste was spilled into the Omai river and then the Essequibo iver following a dam failure.
1996	Mt. Tapian	The Philippines	Marcopper Mining	Canada	Marcopper mining disaster: A fracture of the drainage tunnel for a tailings pit led to discharge of toxic waste into Makulapnit-Boac river system, causing large-scale destruction of crops, burying one village with mud and requiring 20 other villages to be evacuated.
1998	Kumtor Gold Mine	Kyrgyzstan	Centerra Gold	Canada	A truck carrying 1,762 kg of sodium cyanide fell into the Barskaun River. An international independent group of experts studied the impact of the accident and concluded that no one was killed or poisoned as a result of the accident.
2000	Baia Mare	Romania	Esmerelda Exploration Limited	Australia	2000 Baia Mare cyanide spill: A dam failure resulted in the leak of 100,000 cubic metres of cyanide-contaminated water which spilled into the Someş and Tisza. Pollution flowed into Europe's second largest river, the Danube, and finally into the Black Sea, across six countries. Hungary asserted the spill killed 1,241 tonnes of fish in Hungary alone.
2000	Tolukuma gold mine	Papua New Guinea	Dome Resources	Australia	A one-tonne cyanide crate fell from a helicopter into the jungle, while heavy rain in the area washed 100–150 kg of it into a river.
2006	Beaconsfield gold mine	Australia			Beaconsfield Mine collapse: 1 miner was killed and 2 were trapped underground for a fortnight.
2009	Ahafo gold mine	Ghana	Newmont	USA	Overflow of process solution containing sodium cyanide occurred within the processing plant site at Newmont Ghana's open pit Ahafo Mine. This resulted in water contamination and fish mortality.
5 August 2015	Gold King Mine	USA		USA	2015 Gold King Mine waste water spill: In Silverton, Colorado, Environmental Protection Agency (EPA) personnel, along with workers for Environmental Restoration LLC, caused the release of toxic waste water into the Animas River watershed.
2015	Veladero mine, San Juan province	Argentina	Barrick Gold	Canada	1,072 cubic meters of cyanide solution reached the Potrerillos River due to a valve failure.
2019	Kampine mine, Kampine town, Maniema	Democratic Republic of the Congo			22 illegal miners dead in an illegally run mine.
2020	Kamituga mine, Kamitung town, South Kivu	Democratic Republic of the Congo			50+ people died after a mine collapse due to heavy rain. Three tunnels to the mine were blocked as a result of the heavy flow of water.
7 November 2021	Kondago village	Niger		Niger	Niger gold mine collapse - 30+ miners killed.
21 February 2022	Gbomblora	Burkina Faso	Informal site	Burkina Faso	Gbomblora explosion - 60 people killed; over 100 people were injured.
13 February 2024	Çöpler Gold Mine, İliç, Erzincan	Turkey	SSR Mining, Anagold Mining	USA, Turkey	9 miners under cyanide containing soil landslide.
2024	Eagle Gold Mine	Canada	Victoria Gold Corp	Canada	On June 24, 2024, 300,000 cubic metres of cyanide-contaminated water leaked from a heap leach failure in Victoria Gold Corp's Eagle Gold Mine site near Mayo, Yukon. The failure resulted in the company being forced into court ordered receivership and its stock being delisted from the TSX.
