= Loropéni =

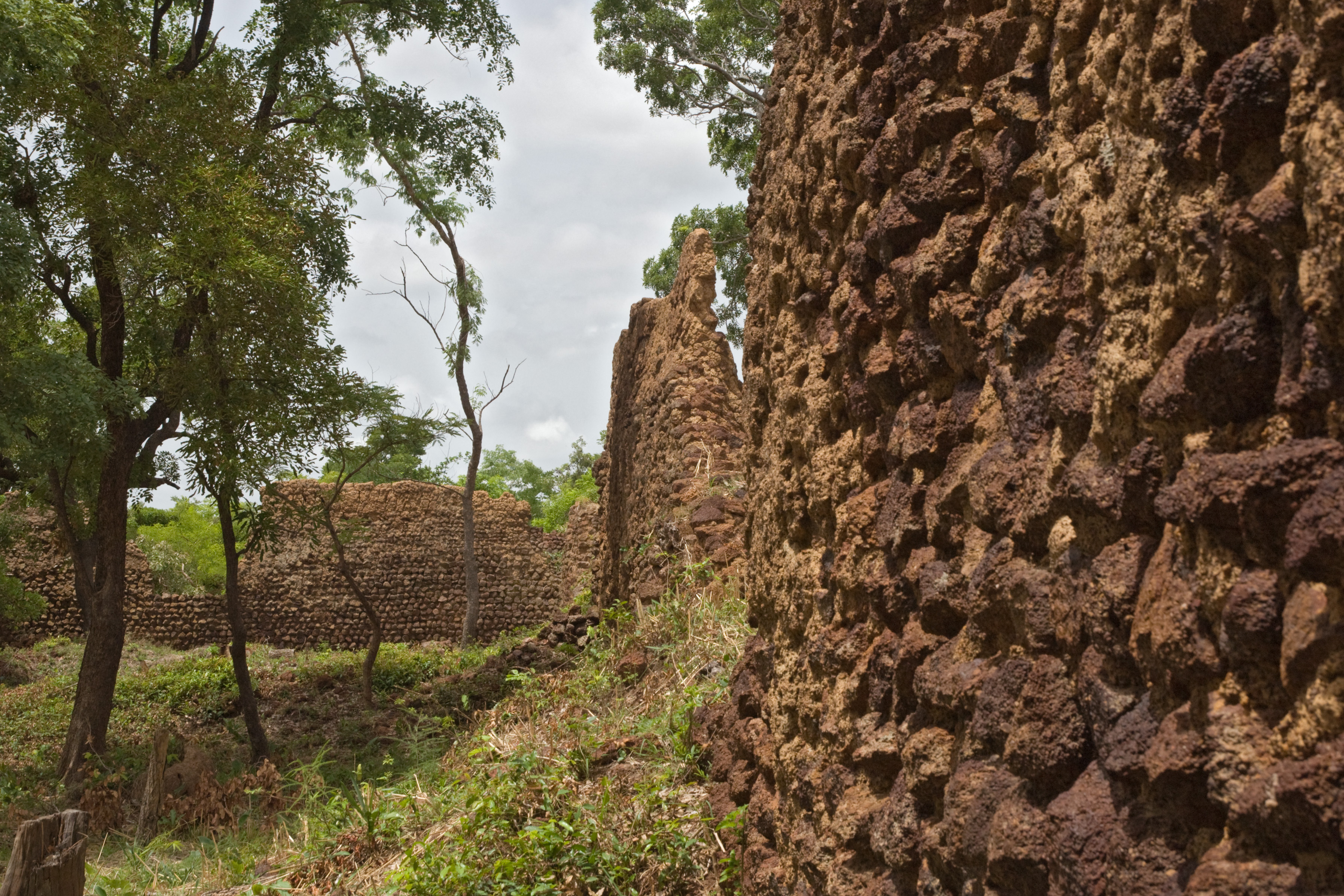
- Remains of defensive walls at the ruins of Loropéni, May 2016

- Location within Burkina Faso
- Coordinates: 10°18′N 3°32′W
- Country: Burkina Faso
- Region: Sud-Ouest
- Province: Poni
- Department: Loropéni
- Time zone: UTC+0 (GMT)

UNESCO World Heritage Site
- Official name: Ruins of Loropéni
- Criteria: Cultural: (iii)
- Reference: 1225rev
- Inscription: 2009 (33rd Session)

Loropéni is a market town in southern Burkina Faso, lying about 40 kilometres (25 mi) west of Gaoua. Nearby are the medieval stone ruins of Loropéni, added to the UNESCO World Heritage List in 2009. These ruins of a fortress, which date back at least a thousand years, are the country's first World Heritage Site.
