= Toroparu mine =

Gold mine in Cuyuni-Mazaruni, Guyana

- Location within Guyana
- Location: Cuyuni-Mazaruni, Guyana; 6.45051°N 60.05317°W
- Products: Gold
- Company: Gold X Mining
- Website: https://goldxmining.com/

The Toroparu mine is estimated to be one of the largest gold mining projects in Guyana. The mine is located in the north-west of the country in Cuyuni-Mazaruni. The mine has estimated reserves of 6 million oz of gold.

Gold X Mining, (formerly Sandspring Resources) has plans develop three open-pit mines with a mine life of 22 years (per 2019 estimate) with possible mining of copper and silver. The company has invested more than US$150 million to discover and delineate its gold mineral resources, as well as to complete engineering and environmental studies, including a 225 km road from Georgetown to make the mine accessible completed in 2003. The company has a Memorandum of Understanding with the government of Guyana for plans to develop a hydropower plant at the Kumarau Falls on the Kurupung River.

The company anticipates the government of Guyana will issue their mining license in 2021 after a final feasibility study.

== See also ==
- Mining in Guyana
- Aurora gold mine
- Omai mine
