= Pork-knocker =

Guyanese freelance prospectors

Pork-knockers are freelance Guyanese prospectors who mine for diamonds and gold in the alluvial plains of the Guyanese interior. Pork-knockers have been responsible for discovering large deposits of gold and diamonds. The name "pork-knockers" refers to their regular diet of pickled pork of wild pig that is often eaten at the end of the day. Caribbean author A. R. F. Webber suggested that the term may have originated as "pork-barrel knocker".

== History ==
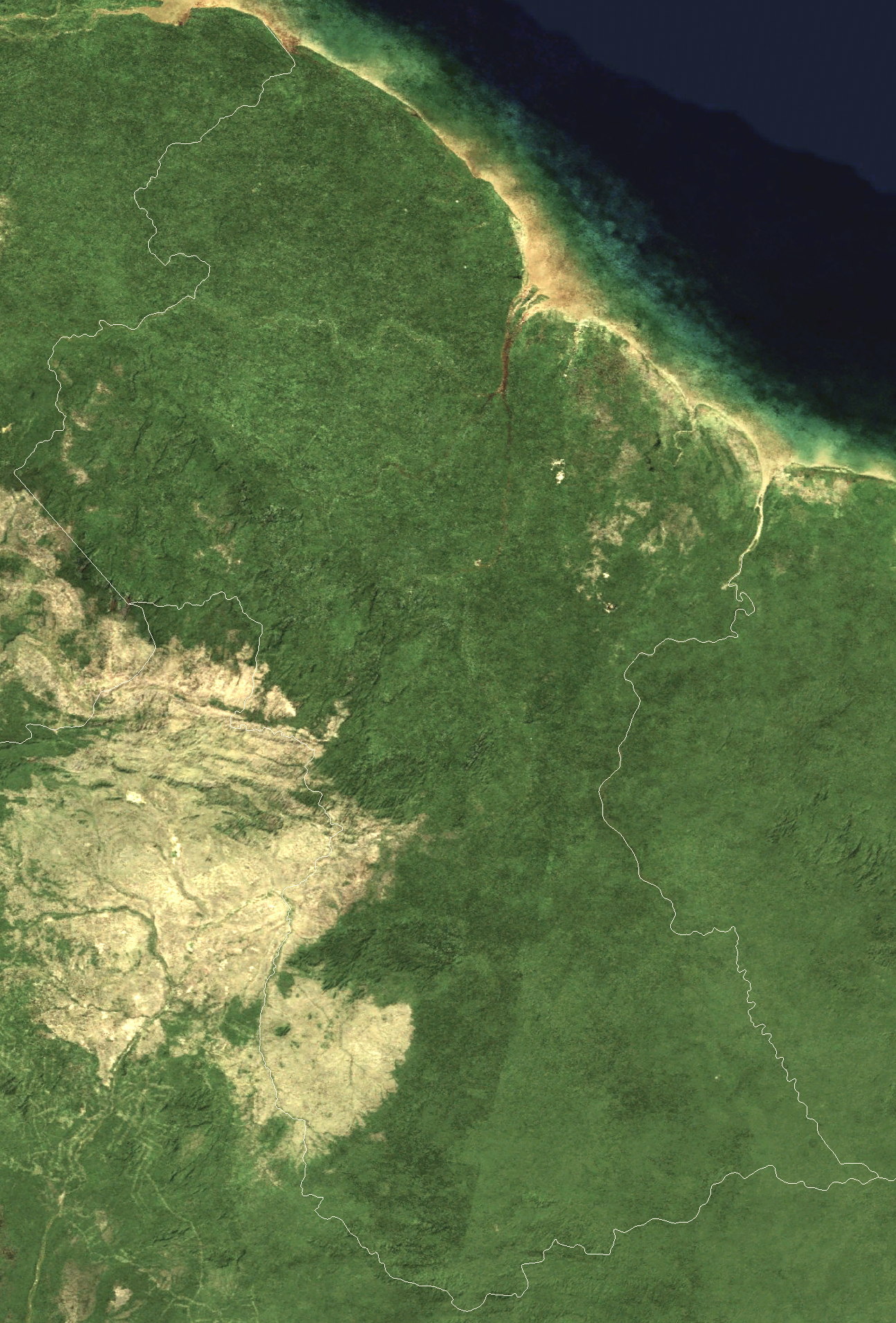
Satellite image of Guyana from 2004.

Small-scale mining attracted many Afro-Guyanese before and after emancipation as a way to cope with unemployment and to avoid conflict-ridden agricultural work. Mining continues to be a traditional occupation for Afro-Guyanese since the bauxite industry began in the 20th century.

A 1921 account observed that most pork-knockers of that era were of African descent and worked individually or in small groups. Pork-knockers have often been dependent on bush traders, who carry mining supplies and sometimes grubstake the pork-knockers' operations. Pork-knockers may work in close proximity to each other and disputed claims may lead to violence.

Pork-knocking is extremely hazardous and deaths are not uncommon. Miners were crushed under falling trees, earth, and rock. Drowning often occurs as mining operations are typically based on rivers to capture gold and diamond-laden sediments. The remoteness and wild terrain are a challenge for receiving emergency medical care.

== Culture and conflict ==
Pork-knockers engage in a distinct social system, defined by their distance from home; "outside of the moral surveillance of a domicile". Success demands conspicuous displays of generosity, giving the miner social prestige and inject money into the isolated economies. Selfishness is associated with distrust, and can damage a miner's access to credit, and also belief that when a miner is stingy, the earth will also deprive them of its bounty.

The presence of pork-knockers in the Guyanese interior has upset traditional Amerindian life there. The Akawaio people have experienced land disputes with pork-knockers and have been adversely affected by a rising cost of living. Amazonian anthropologist Audrey Butt Colson observed that mining has led to a collapse of the subsistence economy. Butt Colson writes that mining village Kamarang, known as "Red Light City", typifies the "pork-knocker syndrome of drink, gambling, sex, conspicuous consumption and, from time to time, violence."

Mining is also under-taken by Amerindians, but there are different social mechanisms in place creating a distinction from those who come from Guyana's urban coast (known as 'coastlanders'). Hinterland mining supplements farming, so proceeds are devoted towards household consumption.

== In popular culture ==
There are Guyanese folk songs influenced by pork-knocker culture, often addressing the danger of the occupation and the hope of finding gold. In 1996, playwright Harold Bascom won the Guyana Prize for Makantali, inspired by the folk song by the same name.

Many Guyanese stories describe pork-knockers who have made fortunes only to lose them in a tragic or comic fashion. Guyana-born author Jan Carew's 1958 novel Black Midas involves a boy leaving his coastal village to become a pork-knocker. Sheik Sadeek, a novelist and playwright, produced stories about Guyana's colonial era working class, and often used pork-knockers as the subject of his works, including the play Porkknockers.

In 2010, Guyanese artist Barrington Braithwaite released a comic book Illustrated History of the Porkknocker as a collaboration with the Guyana Geology and Mines Commission. Another graphic novel by Braithwaite, Mighty Itanamie, is a supernatural fiction based on pork-knocker legends.

== See also ==
- Mining in Guyana
- Aurora gold mine
- Omai mine
