= Ruins of Loropéni =

UNESCO World Heritage Site
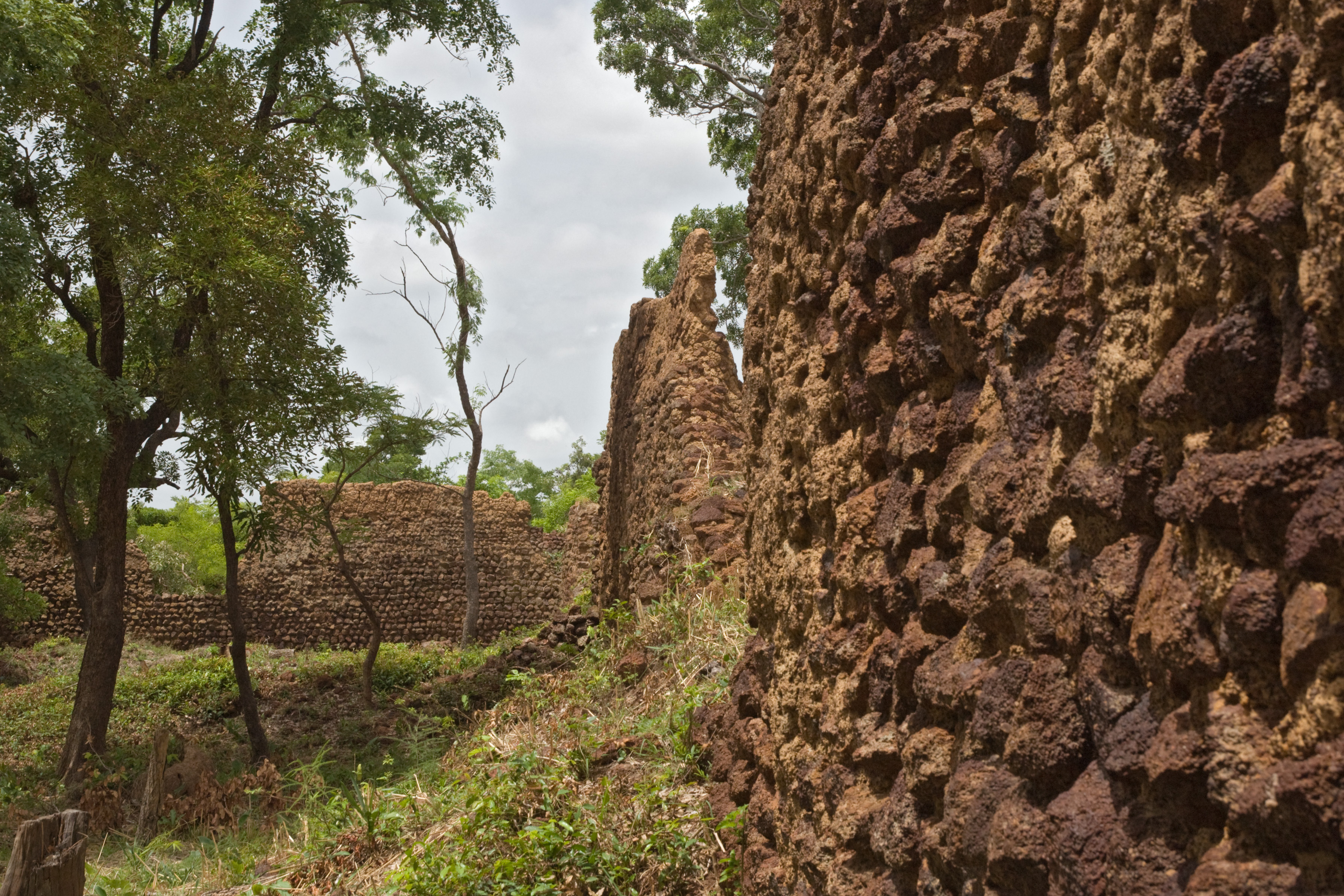
- Remains of defensive walls, May 2016

- Location within Burkina Faso
- Location: Loropéni, Loropéni Department, Poni Province, Sud-Ouest Region, Burkina Faso
- Criteria: Cultural: (iii)
- Reference: 1225rev
- Inscription: 2009 (33rd Session)
- Area: 1.113 ha (2.8 acres)
- Buffer zone: 2.784 km^{2} (1.1 sq mi)
- Coordinates: 10°18′37″N 3°33′46″W

The ruins of Loropéni (French: Ruines de Loropéni) are a medieval heritage site near the town of Loropéni in southern Burkina Faso. They were added to the UNESCO World Heritage List in 2009. These ruins were the country's first World Heritage site. The site, which spans 1.113 hectares (2.75 acres), includes an array of stone walls that comprised a medieval fortress, the best preserved of ten in the area. They date back at least a thousand years. The settlement was occupied by the Lohron or Kulango people and prospered from the trans-Saharan gold trade, reaching its height between the 14th and 17th centuries. It was abandoned in the early 19th century.

== Excavation work ==
Gaoua town in Poni Province in Burkina Faso is considered the nearest town to the ruins of Loropéni. The archaeological site is overgrown by shrubbery and dense trees, making it hardly visible. The ruins walls stand at a height of 6 meters and expand at area of 11,000 square meters (approximately 2.7 acres), which piqued archaeologists and scientists interest in discovering what Loropéni ruins were meant to encompass beyond residents and abodes.

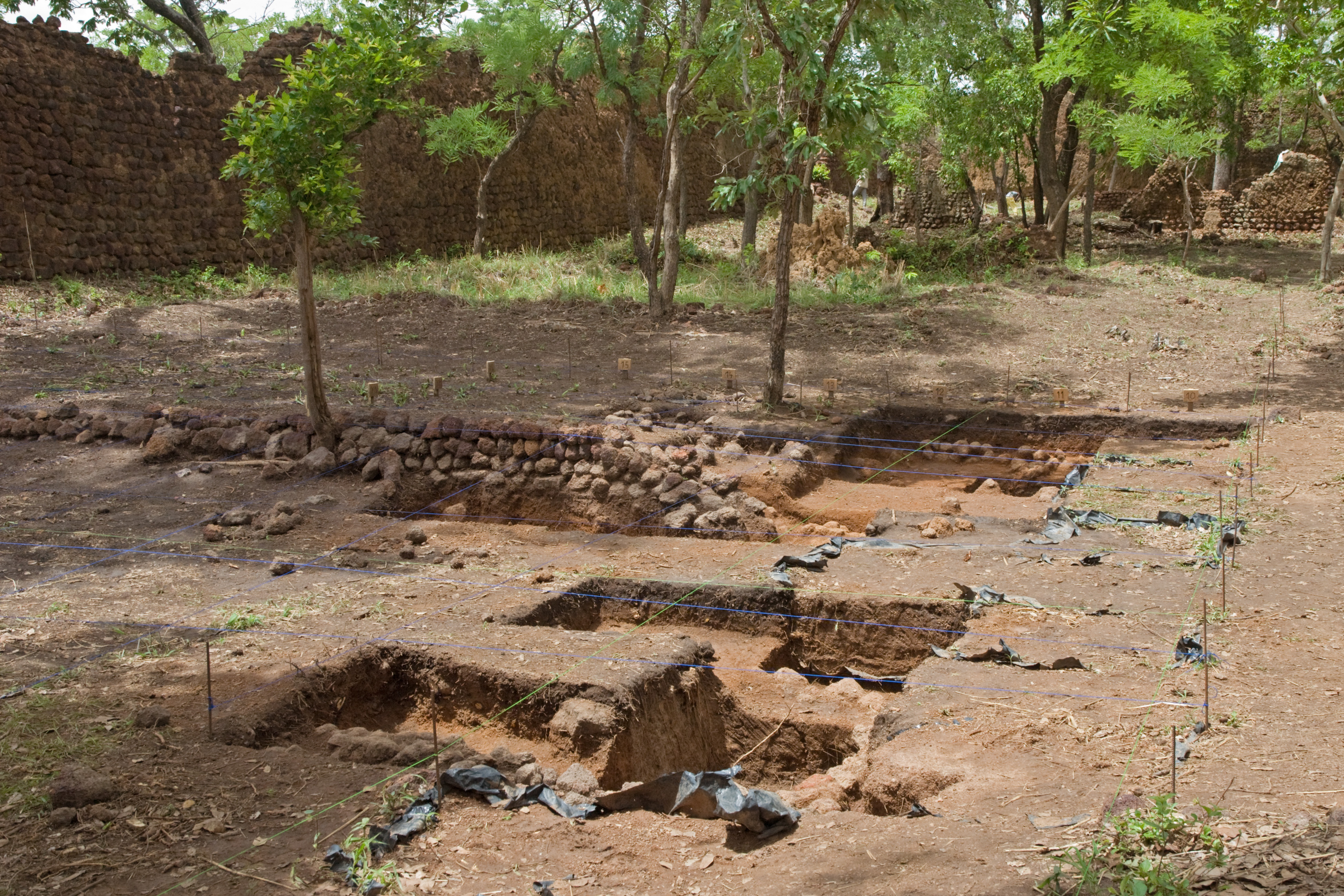
Archeological excavations at the ruins, May 2016

== Trans-Saharan trade ==
Loropéni is believed to have been set up by kingdoms in West Africa which strove to secure a foothold in the regional trade. The Ghana Empire had a firm grip at that time on the gold mines in Bambuk and Boure, as roads leading from the mines headed into Koumbi Saleh, the empire’s capital, before proceeding north; and by law, all gold nuggets belonged to the emperor. The early Trans-Saharan routes did not interject the general area of Loropéni, but was close to the ancient city of Djenné, located to its northwest, and Timbuktu and Gao, located to the north; Timbuktu and Gao were termini for the Trans-Saharan trade. It was believed that Loropéni witnessed gold trade due to its proximity to the two Trans-Saharan termini.

=== Theories behind the secret of the walls ===
The imposing height of the ruins walls was hence allocated to preserving gold inside the ruins, yet these deductions were made from circumstantial evidence.

== Presumptions about its indigenous people ==
=== Kaan people ===
The Gan/Kaan people, a minority group whose homeland includes the site of the ruins, were believed to have constructed the Loropéni ruins. On that account, this version of events states that Tokpa Farma, the Kaan Iya (king/ruler), built the site with the intention of moving the capital from Obiré, which is eight kilometers from Loropéni; however, the revised timeline makes it clear that the Kaan could not have built the fortifications but occupied and abandoned them.

=== Lobi (Ghana people) ===
The Mali Empire was the source of a significant gold price collapse that affected Cairo, Mecca, and Medina for ten years. It was triggered by its monarch, Mansa Musa, who donated a significant amount of gold during his hajj to Mecca in 1324. Loropeni's gold-rich prosperity coincided with the Mali emperor showering everyone with gold dust; as with the Ghana Empire, its predecessor. The Lobi people, who were under pressure from the Ashanti kingdom's constant expansion from the south, crossed the Mouhoun river to reach their ancient homeland, which they knew to be situated to the right of the Black Volta, or Mouhoun River. This territory is now part of the present-day nation of Ghana.

=== Lorhon people ===
The only known connection between the Lorhon peoples and the ruins is that by the tenth century, they were known to be in Kong, a region to the south of the region. As things stand, it is assumed that the Lorhon peoples may have had some involvement with the ruins in Loropéni, but even that connection is vague at best. Before its ascent to imperial power, Kong was ruled by the Senufos and went on to become an empire (1710–1898) that included territory in both Côte d'Ivoire and Burkina Faso.

Other groups moved farther and ended up in what is now Burkina Faso, driving the Lorhons into the marginally safer northern parts. More people are knowledgeable of these mid-1700s traverses northward than of the first movement that brought them to Kong.

Its fortunes declined as the Trans-Saharan trade collapsed along with the empires of Mali and Songhai to the north. Trade shifted to the coast, where Europeans had established trading posts, and gold was now sourced from Ashanti holdings closer to the coast, making it unfavorable to extract gold.

== Protection and management ==
The Loropeni ruins are the best-preserved remains of the larger Lobi Ruins. The Committee of Protection and Management for the Ruins of Loropéni formed a good basis for management of the ruins as a focal point for sustainable development within the local community, however the site was severely impacted by environmental conditions, including increasing rainfall variability and extreme temperature cycles.
