= Djigoue =

- Location within Burkina Faso, French West Africa
- Coordinates: 10.049994°N 3.823242°W
- Country: Burkina Faso
- Region: Sud-Ouest Region
- Province: Poni Province
- Department: Djigoue Department
- Time zone: UTC+0 (GMT)

Djigoue is the capital of the Djigoue Department of Poni Province in south-western Burkina Faso.

Population
Year	Pop.	±%
1985	954	—
2006	2,266	+137.5%
2019	5,043	+122.6%
