= SXL =

SXL may refer to:

- SXL, the IATA code for Sligo Airport, Strandhill, County Sligo, Ireland
- SXL (band), a 1987–1988 jazz fusion ensemble formed by Bill Laswell
- Selonian language (ISO 639-3 code)
- Sex-lethal or Sxl gene, a gene important in alternative splicing
- SXL, the NYSE ticker symbol for Sunoco Logistics Partners L.P.
