= Silvercorp =

Silvercorp can mean:

- Silvercorp Metals, a Canadian-based, China-focused mining firm
- Silvercorp USA, a private military company involved in Operation Gideon (2020), a failed attempt to invade Venezuela and capture Nicolás Maduro
