= Gbomblora =

Village in Burkina Faso

- Location within Burkina Faso
- Coordinates: 10°15′20″N 3°03′04″W
- Country: Burkina Faso
- Regions: Sud-Ouest Region
- Province: Poni Province
- Department: Gbomblora Department

Population (2019)
  - Total: 240
- Time zone: UTC+0 (GMT)

Gbomblora is a village in the province of Poni in the Sud-Ouest Region of Burkina Faso. It is the capital of Gbomblora Department.

== Geography ==
Gbomblora is located roughly 12 kilometers to the south east of the town of Gaoua. It is connected to the route nationale 11.

== History ==
In February 2022, Gbomblora was scene of a deadly explosion at a gold mine.

== Economy ==
Since 2015, the town (like all that are part of the Gbomblora Department) has been connected to the national electricity network as part of the electrification of Noumbiel.

== Demographics ==
In 2006, the population was 169.

== Health and education ==
Gbomblora has a health and social promotion center (CSPS) while the regional hospital center (CHR) of the province is located in Gaoua.
