= Bouroum-Bouroum =

Coordinates: 10.536°N 3.236°W

Bouroum-Bouroum is the capital of Bouroum-Bouroum Department in Poni Province, Burkina Faso. The main ethnic group is the Lobi.
