= Firecell =

- Type: Private
- Founded: 2021
- Founder: Claude Seyrat; Olivier Dhotel; Cedric Thienot; Ulla Saari
- Headquarters: Nice, France
- Key people: Claude Seyrat (CEO)
- Website: https://firecell.io

Firecell is a French company specializing in private 5G network solutions, founded in 2021 and headquartered in Nice.

== History ==
The company was founded in May 2021 by Claude Seyrat, Olivier Dhotel, Cedric Thienot, and Ulla Saari—former executives from Expway-Enensys and Orange—following the opening of private mobile network frequencies in Europe, the Americas, and Asia.

In March 2022, Firecell's GEO-5G project, backed by a consortium including Stellantis, Axians, Euroutils, Miodex, TMF, AW2S, and Sequans, was selected under the French government's 5G Acceleration Plan.

In March 2024, The company raised €6.6 million in equity funding from Ventech, Matterwave Ventures, Bpifrance Digital Venture, and Bouygues Telecom Initiatives.

== Recognition ==
- 2022: Winner of the 24th i-Lab Innovation Competition.
- 2022: Selected among the laureates of the French Tech DeepNum20 excellence program.
- French Tech 2030 Initiative: Recognized in the "Mastering Sovereign & Secure Digital Technologies" category.
- 2025: Listed in Challenges magazine’s "100 Startups to Invest in" selection.
