= Bousséra Department =

Coordinates: 10°20′00″N 3°01′00″W

- Department
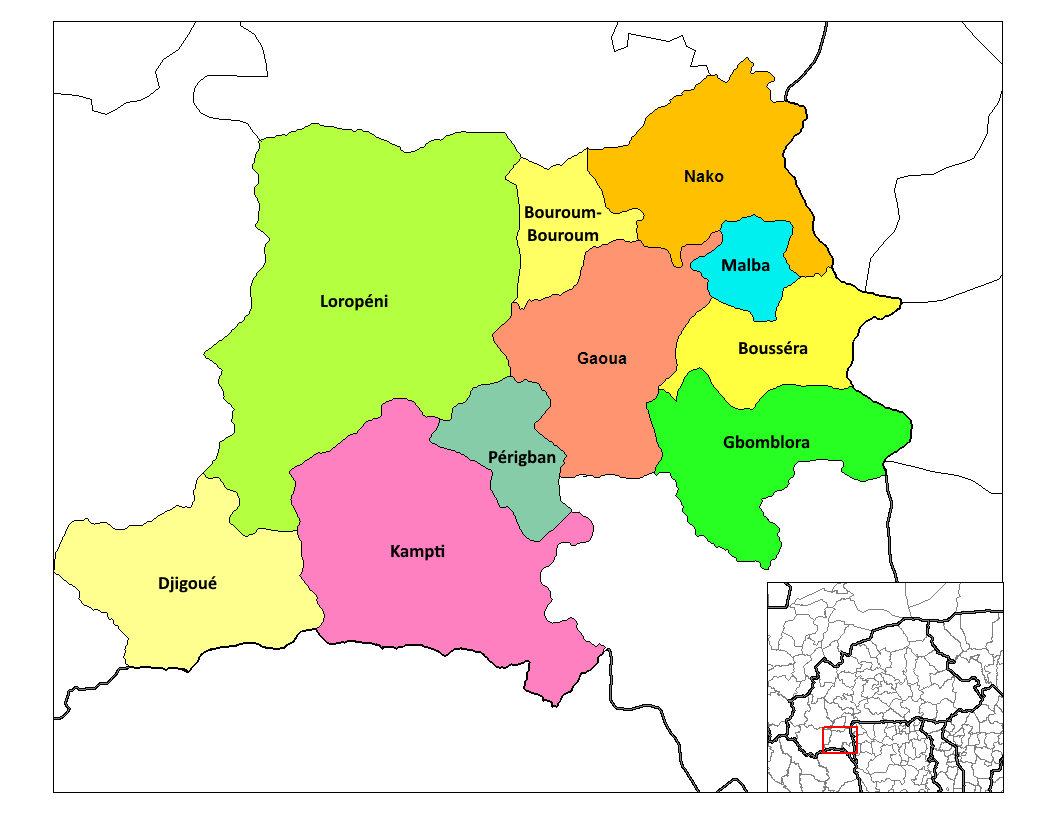
- Bousséra Department location in the province
- Country: Burkina Faso
- Province: Poni Province
- Time zone: UTC+0 (GMT 0)

Bousséra Department is a department or commune of Poni Province in southern Burkina Faso. Its capital lies in the town of Bousséra.
