= Djigoué Department =

Coordinates: 10°03′00″N 3°49′24″W

Djigoue
- Department
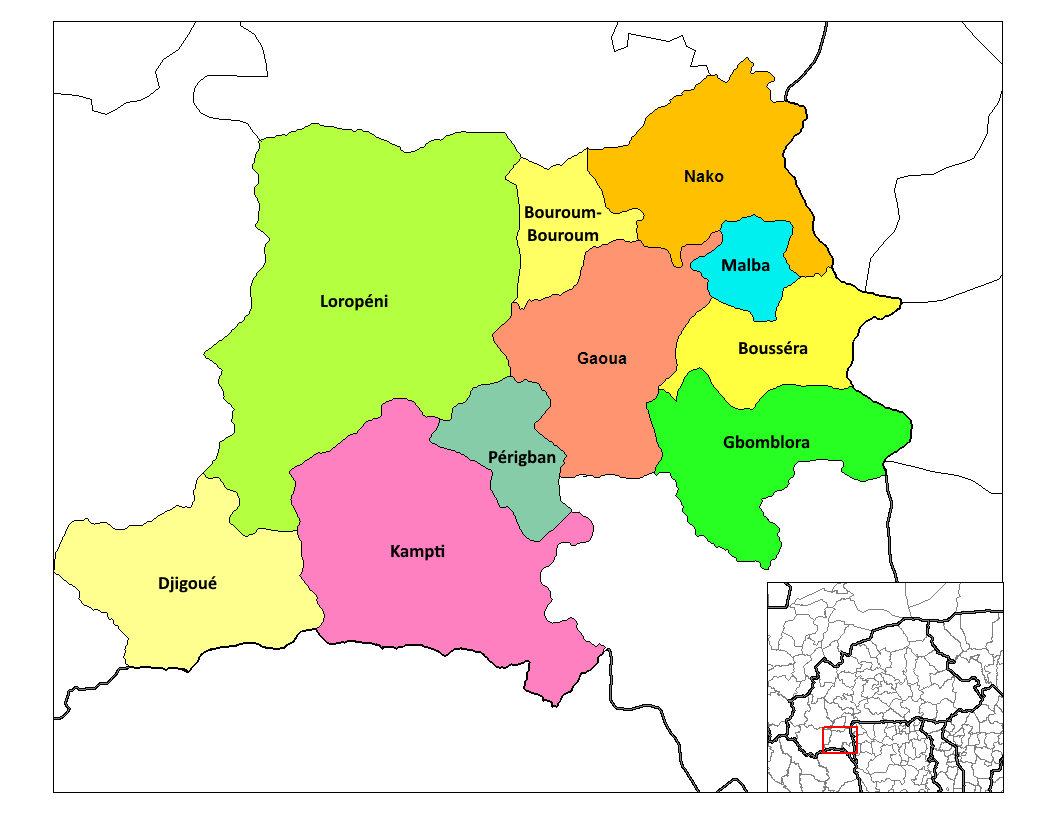
- Djigoue Department location in the province
- Country: Burkina Faso
- Province: Poni Province
- Time zone: UTC+0 (GMT 0)

Djigoue is a department or commune of Poni Province in southern Burkina Faso. Its population in 2006 was 20,319 residents. Its capital is Djigoue.

== Towns and villages ==
The department and the municipality of Djigoué consists of 28 villages including the eponymous capital (from the consensus report of 2006):

- Babrora (75 residents)
- Badora (217 residents)
- Bawé-Bininbom (1 024 residents)
- Bawé-Dara (1 928 residents)
- Birira (3 483 residents)
- Bourio-Gan (223 residents)
- Djatakoro (927 residents)
- Djigoué (2 266 residents), capital
- Dompo (195 residents)
- Donkua (Namyaré) (636 residents)
- Filakora (597 residents)
- Gongomboulo (938 residents)
- Hélintira (1 651 residents)
- Kaléboukoura (293 residents)
- Kankongno (404 residents)
- Kankongo (505 residents)
- Mampoura (929 residents)
- Moulépo (306 residents)
- Nahinéna (351 residents)
- N'Donhira (161 residents)
- Pokamboulo (602 residents)
- Sarmassi-Gan (526 residents)
- Sarmassi-Lobi (260 residents)
- Terpo (599 residents)
- Tiébon (Dimbo) (830 residents)
- Tiwéra (273 residents)
