= Bouroum-Bouroum Department =

Coordinates: 10°32′00″N 3°14′00″W

Bouroum-Bouroum
- Department
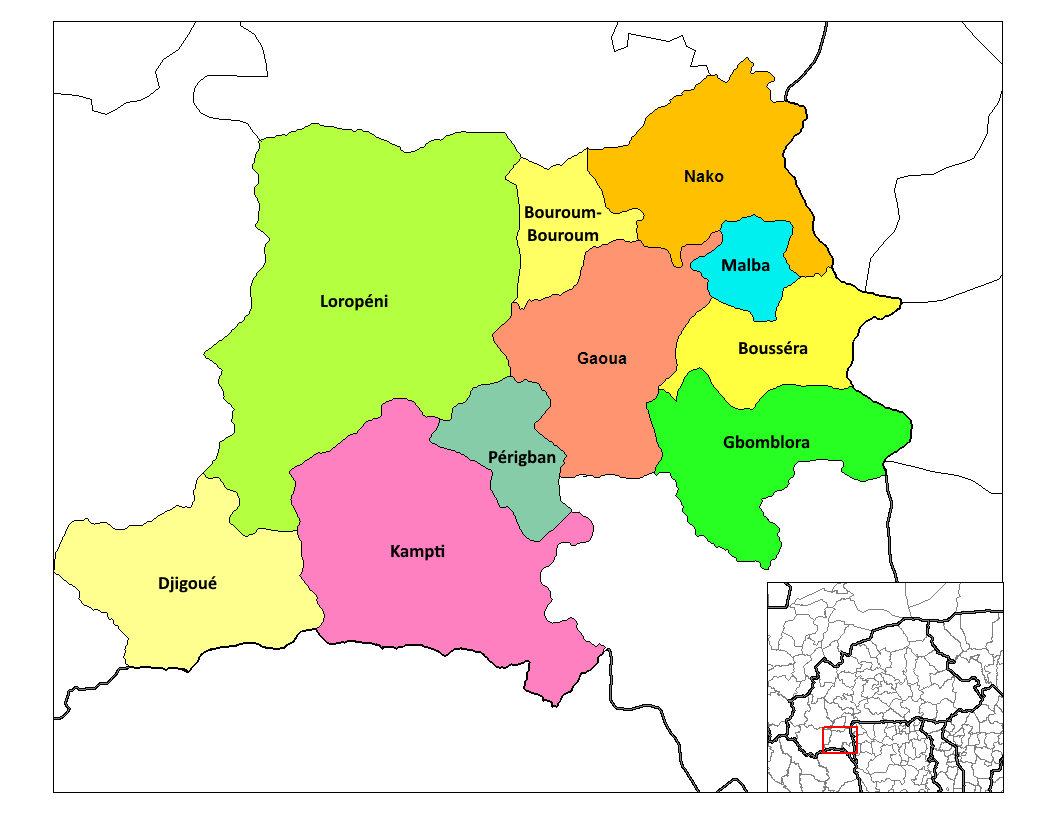
- Bouroum-Bouroum Department location in the province
- Country: Burkina Faso
- Province: Poni Province

Area
  - Total: 110.8 sq mi (287.1 km^{2})

Population (2019 census)
  - Total: 13,939
  - Density: 125.7/sq mi (48.55/km^{2})
- Time zone: UTC+0 (GMT 0)

Bouroum-Bouroum is a department or commune of Poni Province in southern Burkina Faso. Its capital lies at the town of Bouroum-Bouroum.
