= Loropéni Department =

Coordinates: 10.2833°N 3.51667°W

Loropeni
- Department
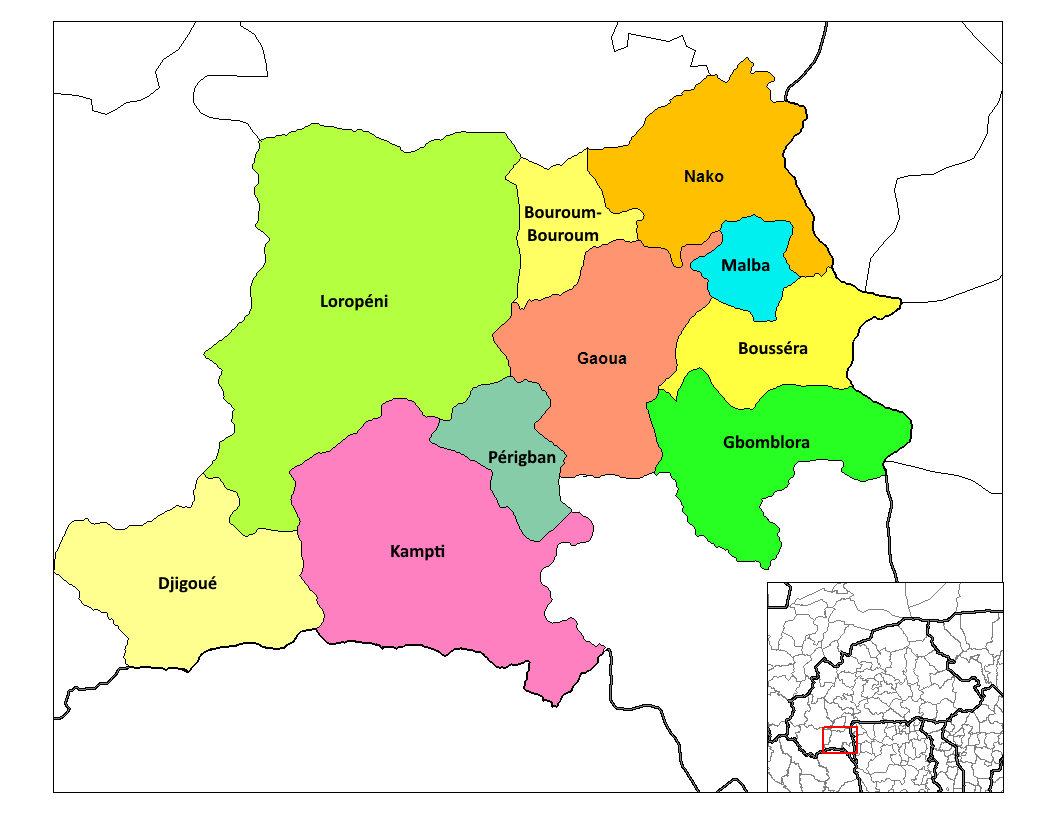
- Loropeni Department location in the province
- Country: Burkina Faso
- Province: Poni Province

Area
  - Total: 795 sq mi (2,059 km^{2})

Population (2019 census)
  - Total: 61,952
  - Density: 77.93/sq mi (30.09/km^{2})
- Time zone: UTC+0 (GMT 0)

Loropeni is a department or commune of Poni Province in southern Burkina Faso. Its capital lies at the town of Loropeni.

== Towns and villages ==
Its capital lies at the town of Loropeni.

== Places of interest ==
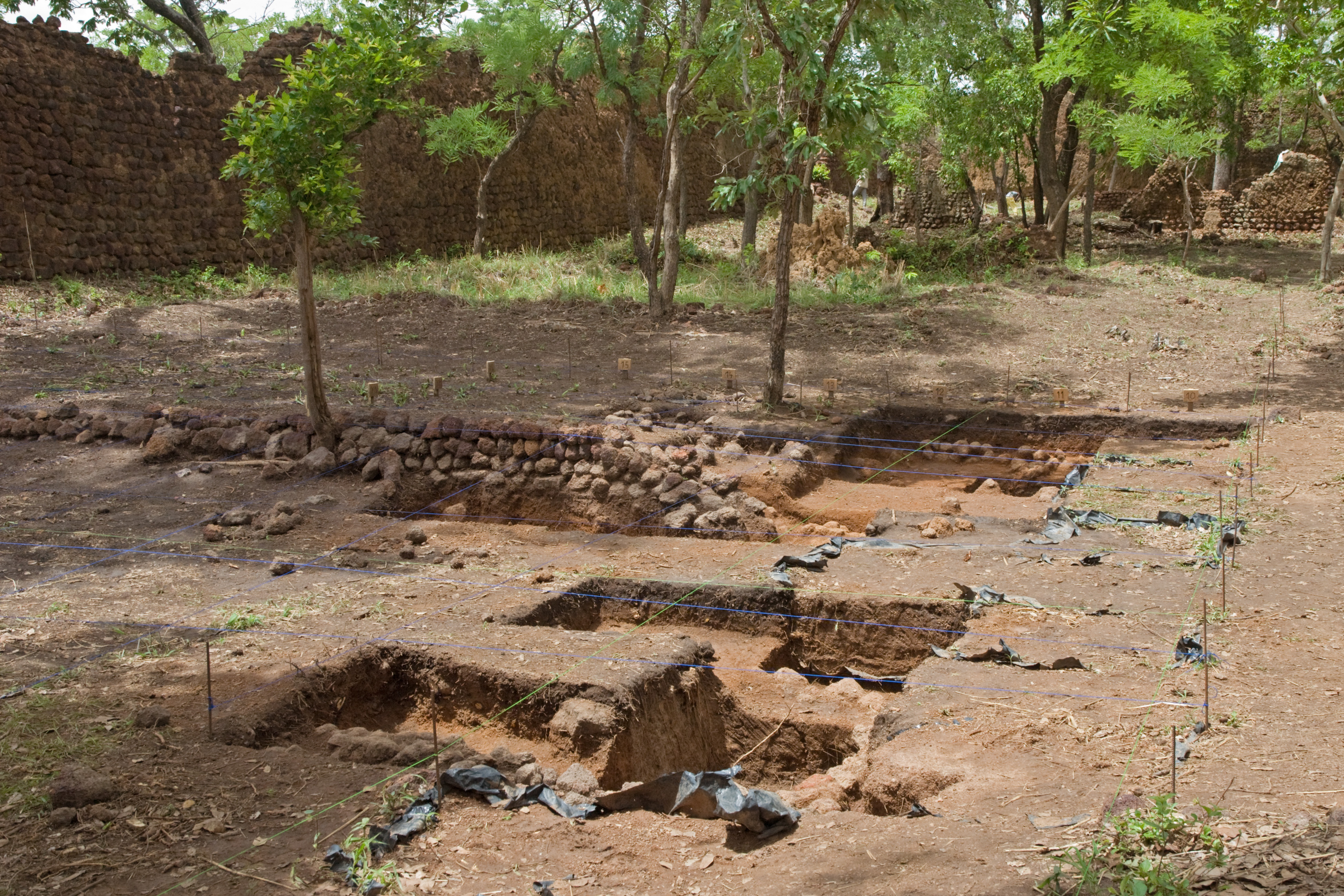
The Ruins of Loropéni

The Department is home to Burkina Faso's first UNESCO World Heritage site, the Ruins of Loropéni, which was added to the UNESCO World Heritage List in 2009.
