= Malba Department =

Coordinates: 10°28′N 2°59′W

Malba
- Department
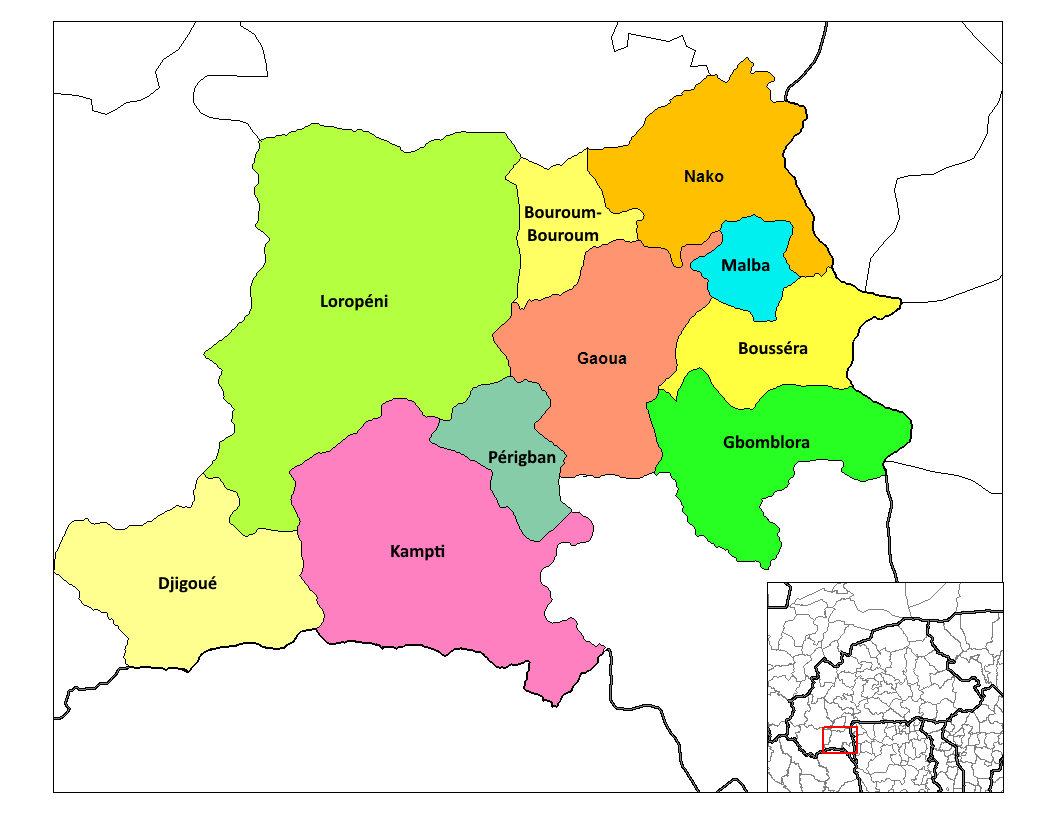
- Malba Department location in the province
- Country: Burkina Faso
- Province: Poni Province

Area
  - Total: 68.9 sq mi (178.5 km^{2})

Population (2019 census)
  - Total: 12,681
  - Density: 184.0/sq mi (71.04/km^{2})
- Time zone: UTC+0 (GMT 0)

Malba is a department or commune of Poni Province in southern Burkina Faso. Its capital lies at the town of Malba.
