= Glauco Lolli-Ghetti =

Italian shipowner and sports executive (1921–2006)

- Born: 29 April 1921; Ferentino, Italy
- Died: 18 April 2006 (aged 84); Lerici, Italy
- Occupations: Shipowner, business executive
- Known for: Founder of Scorpio Group; President of U.C. Sampdoria
- Spouse: Maria Amelia Bibolini

Glauco Lolli-Ghetti (29 April 1921 – 18 April 2006) was an Italian shipowner and sports executive. He is best known as the founder of the Scorpio Group, one of the world's leading shipping conglomerates, and for twice serving as president of Genoa-based football club U.C. Sampdoria. Over a career spanning more than five decades, he expanded a family shipping business into a global enterprise and pioneered double-hull oil tanker design. He was referred to in the industry as the "Italian Onassis."

== Early life and education ==
Lolli-Ghetti was born on 29 April 1921 in Ferentino, in the Lazio region of central Italy. He graduated in pharmaceutical chemistry from the University of Genoa in 1944. He married Maria Amelia, the niece of prominent Genoese shipowner and senator Giovanni Battista Bibolini, through whom he entered the Bibolini family's established shipping enterprise as administrative director.

== Shipping career ==
=== Entry into the industry (1944–1964) ===
After joining the Bibolini group, Lolli-Ghetti rose steadily through the organisation. Following the death of Senator Bibolini in 1955, he established Carboflotta, a new shipping company that marked his first independent venture. In 1964, he founded a successor entity, Carbonavi, which further expanded the fleet under his direction.

=== Double-hull tankers and international recognition (1966–1972) ===
In 1966, Lolli-Ghetti commissioned the construction of the first ecologically designed double-hull oil tankers, a pioneering initiative in marine environmental safety that preceded widespread industry adoption by decades. In recognition of this contribution, he received the internationally recognised "Maritime Man of the Year" award in 1970.

In autumn 1972, he acquired control of Navigazione Alta Italia (NAI), one of Italy's major shipping companies, becoming its president. Under his leadership, the NAI fleet grew to more than 50 vessels in active service, including the first Very Large Crude Carriers (VLCCs) to sail under the Italian flag. That same year, he was appointed president of the Italian Shipowners' Association (Confitarma), a role he held for five years, during which he supported the reunification of the organisation.

=== Cavaliere del Lavoro and Scorpio Group (1973–2003) ===
In 1973, he was awarded the Cavaliere del Lavoro, Italy's highest honour for distinguished service to the national economy by the President of the Italian Republic.

Following a financial crisis that engulfed NAI in the mid-1970s which Lolli-Ghetti had anticipated and distanced himself from in advance, he relocated first to New York, where he acquired Scorpio Ship Management, and subsequently to the Principality of Monaco, where he established the company's permanent headquarters. In 1976, Scorpio Ship Management was formally incorporated in New York.

Under his stewardship, the Scorpio Group grew into a diversified shipping conglomerate, eventually operating one of the world's largest product tanker fleets. The group was valued at approximately $3 billion at its peak. In 2003, Lolli-Ghetti handed leadership of the group to his grandson Emanuele Lauro, who subsequently founded Scorpio Tankers and listed it on the New York Stock Exchange in 2010.

== Other activities ==
=== U.C. Sampdoria ===
Lolli-Ghetti served as president of U.C. Sampdoria, the Genoa-based Serie A football club, on two separate occasions: from 1961 to 1965, and again from 1974 to 1978. He later sold the club to Paolo Mantovani.

=== Margara Golf & Country Club ===
Inspired by a lifelong passion for golf, Lolli-Ghetti founded the Margara Golf & Country Club in the Monferrato hills near Fubine, Alessandria, in the early 1970s. The club's signature 18-hole championship course today known as the Glauco Lolli Ghetti Course was completed in 1974 and has since hosted two Ladies' Italian Opens, 22 editions of the European Challenge Tour, and multiple Italian national championships.

== Legacy ==
Glauco Lolli-Ghetti is credited with transforming a regional Italian shipping operation into a global maritime enterprise. His early advocacy for double-hull tanker design anticipated environmental regulations that would become standard industry practice decades later. The Scorpio Group now led by his great-grandson Emanuele Lauro as a fourth-generation family enterprise continues to operate as one of the world's largest product tanker companies.

The Margara Golf & Country Club and its namesake course remain active in his memory, and several vessels in the historical Scorpio fleet bore the Lolli-Ghetti family name.

== Awards and honours ==
- Maritime Man of the Year (1970)
- Cavaliere del Lavoro (1973), awarded by the President of Italy.
