= Gbomblora explosion =

2022 mining disaster in Burkina Faso

Coordinates: 10°15′05″N 03°01′01″W

Gbomblora mine explosion
- Date: 21 February 2022
- Location: Gbomblora, Gbomblora Department, Burkina Faso
- Type: Mining accident
- Deaths: 60
- Injuries: Over 100

On 21 February 2022, a major explosion, followed by several smaller ones, occurred at a gold mine in Gbomblora, Gbomblora Department, Burkina Faso. They killed about 60 people; over 100 people were injured.

The explosions were most likely related to the chemicals that were used to treat the gold.
