= Omai Mine =

Gold mine in Guyana

Omai Gold Mines
- Location in Guyana
- Location: Cuyuni-Mazaruni, Guyana; 5.430°N 58.763°W
- Products: Gold

The Omai Mine is located in Guyana on the north coast of South America near the west bank of the Essequibo River in the interior of the country. Access to Omai is by road from the capital of Georgetown on the coast, and from the town of Linden approximately 60 km away. There is an operational airstrip on site which can accommodate aircraft from Georgetown (40 min. flight). Gold mining at Omai is known from at least the 1880s, and when it was developed as a large scale mine in 1992 by Cambior, the mine was the largest gold mine in the Guiana Shield and a major source of income and employment in Guyana. During the period from 1992 – 2005, Omai produced 3.7 Moz of gold at an average grade of 1.5 g/t Au from the Fennell and the Wenot open pits.

== History ==
Omai has been known for over 130 years. In the period 1886-1896 some 1890 kg (60,000 ozs.) of gold was extracted from the placer deposits of Gilt, Dunclain and L'Esperence creeks by small-scale miners (also known as pork-knockers) using primitive hand methods. The German Syndicate leased the concession in 1896 and carried out extensive investigation of bedrock quartz lodes by primitive drilling and tunneling and produced 1860 kg (59,800 oz) of gold. After limited success in dredging the alluvial flats, the Syndicate surrendered the property to the pork-knockers in 1907. By 1911 most of the workable ground was considered exhausted, based on the prevailing gold price and mining methods of the period.

Anaconda (British Guiana Mines Ltd.) acquired rights to the area in 1946. Iп order to define reserves, close spaced diamond drilling focused on the primary mineralization in the Omai Stock. Seventy-three AX-diameter boreholes were drilled for a total of 12,400 m. On the basis of surface drilling assay results, a 120 m shaft was sunk near Red Hill and 900 m of cross-cuts were made at the 62 meter level. By 1950, Anaconda had identified a primary ore body with reserves of 54.4 million tonnes grading 1.19 g/t Au. However, due to a combination of low gold prices and a favorable соррег market at the advent of the Korean War, the company decided to relinquish the property in 1951. The detailed mapping and sampling by Anaconda geologists (the best trained in the world at that time) is still of great value.

In May 1985, Golden Star Resources Ltd. (GSR), a junior mineral exploration company listed on the Alberta stock exchange, signed an Exclusive Exploration Permit (EEP) with the Guyana government over the Omai area, and retained Canadian engineering consultancy SNC Inc. to undertake an evaluation-feasibility study of the oxidized zone. They initiated a systematic alluvial and saprolite evaluation program, which included extensive augering and test-pitting to depths of about 4 m. Indicated alluvial reserves of 750,000 tons grading 3.2 g/t Au and indicated saprolite reserves of 1.2 million tonnes grading at 1.44 g/t Au were defined. On the basis of these encouraging surface results, GSR bored six deep diamond drill-holes, totalling 2125 m, to test mineralization in the Omai Intrusive Stock (later to become the Fennell pit).

In March 1987, GSR optioned the property to Placer Dome Inc. of Vancouver, British Columbia, which became the senior joint-venture partner at Omai. Over a three-year period Placer conducted a comprehensive integrated exploration program of surface mapping, trenching, soil geochemistry and ground geophysics, and approximately 24,000 m of diamond drilling. The alluvial deposits in the vicinity of Gilt and Dunclain Creeks were tested using Banka and sonic drilling techniques.

In February 1989, overlapping geochemical and radiometric anomalies drew attention to the Wenot Lake area some 800 m to the south of the Omai Stock. Subsequentlv, eight exploratory holes were drilled leading to the discovery of a second orebody overlain by a supergene-enriched saprolite blanket. In total, 130 "SAP" and "DDH" holes totalling 10,550 m were drilled in order to accurately define the Wenot Lake ore zone. Placer estimated the combined primary, saprolite and alluvial reserves of the Omai gold deposits. Using a 0.7 g/t and 0.5 g/t cutoff value for hard rock and saprolite respectively, geological (indicated) reserves were calculated at 52.8 million tonnes grading 1.35 g/t Au. However, Placer withdrew from the joint-venture for "economic reasons" and complete control of the Omai EEP reverted to GSR.

GSR then entered into a joint-venture agreement with Cambior Inc in May, 1990. Cambior completed 8,500 m of definition drilling to confirm grade, continuity and geological boundaries in the mineralized zones. Following the completion of a successful feasibility study at the end of 1990, Cambior and GSR signed a deal with the government of Guyana to develop Omai by a subsidiary, Omai Gold Mines Ltd. Construction started and the first gold was poured at the end of 1992, a very rapid startup. The published mining reserves were 44.8 million tonnes grading 1.43 g/t Au, and planned gold production of 255,000 oz per year over the first three years (Mining Magazine, September, 1991).

In 2019, Avalon Gold Exploration acquired a PL license from the Government of Guyana and will conduct exploration at Omai for new gold resources.

== Geology ==
The geology whole region is considered to be part of the Mazaruni Group. The Wenot zone occurs along an approximately east-west regional shear dividing tuffaceous meta-sediments in the south from andesitic and basaltic meta-volcanics in the north. Small elongate vertical felsic intrusions with quartz veinlets within 100m of the shear contact host most of the gold. Much of this zone is hidden under later palaeo-alluvial sediments, and has been saprolitised to depths of up to 50m below the surface.

The Fennell zone is located approximately 500m further north and is hosted in a carrot-shaped granitoid plug hosted in andesitic and mafic meta-volcanics. The free gold is contained within narrow low-angle quartz-scheelite veins which locally extend into the country rock.

== Mineralisation ==
The orogenic Omai gold deposit is a slightly younger (Paleoproterozoic) analogue to similar Archean deposits found in other cratonic areas such as the Canadian Shield.

The twin Wenot and Fennell deposits were mined concurrently from 1993 to 2005 from surface open pits T.

Local prospectors continue to work saprolite in the mine area for gold nuggets. Additional gold ore is likely to remain beneath the Fennell pit and along strike from the Wenot zone.

== Environmental incident ==
On 19 August 1995 a tailings dam broke and leaked tailings into the Essequibo River. 4.2 million cubic metres of cyanide-containing slurry escaped. Eighty kilometres of the Essequibo River were declared an environmental disaster zone. Large numbers of fish were killed. Production at the mine was halted for several months while the spill was investigated. The principal mine owners were Cambior Inc., based in Canada; Golden Star Resources Inc, based in Colorado, USA; and the government of Guyana. Cambior owned 65%, and Golden Star 30%, of the mine. Attempts were made in Guyana and in Canada to sue the companies. The Guyana case sought $2 billion in damages. These cases were dismissed in Canada in 1998, and in Guyana in 2002 and 2006. According to a 2002 article in Geotechnical News, the dilute contaminant could not have caused all of the alleged environmental effects.

The environmental alert on the river was lifted after one week, but Indigenous villagers on the river were still using alternative water sources, at considerable inconvenience, seven years after the spill.

The spill was preceded by a smaller sodium cyanide spill in May that killed hundreds of fish.

== See also ==
- Mining in Guyana
- Aurora gold mine
- Toroparu mine
