= Gbomblora Department =

Coordinates: 10°16′N 2°57′W

Gbomblora
- Department
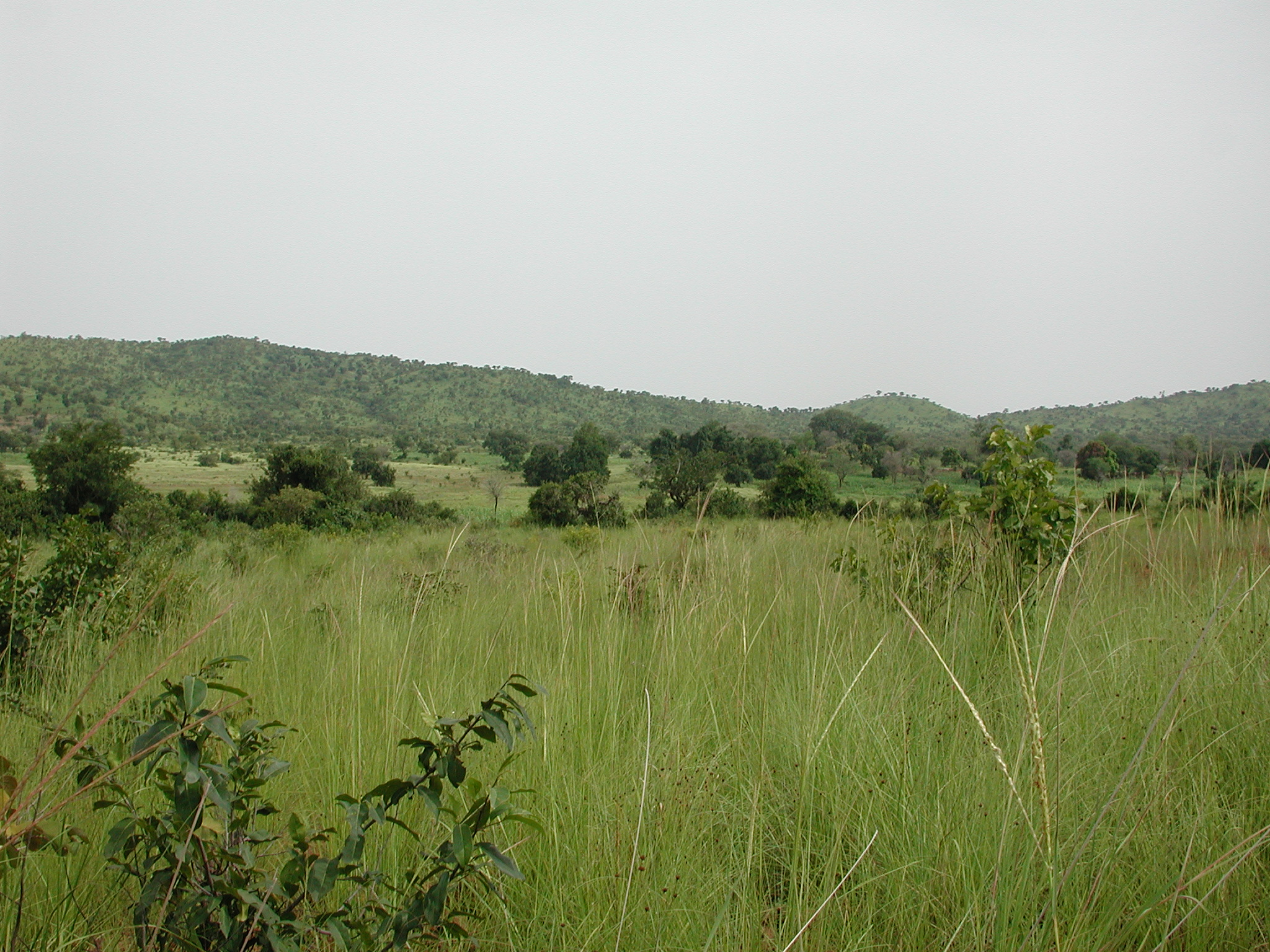
- Landscape near Gbomblora town on the road between Batie and Gaoua

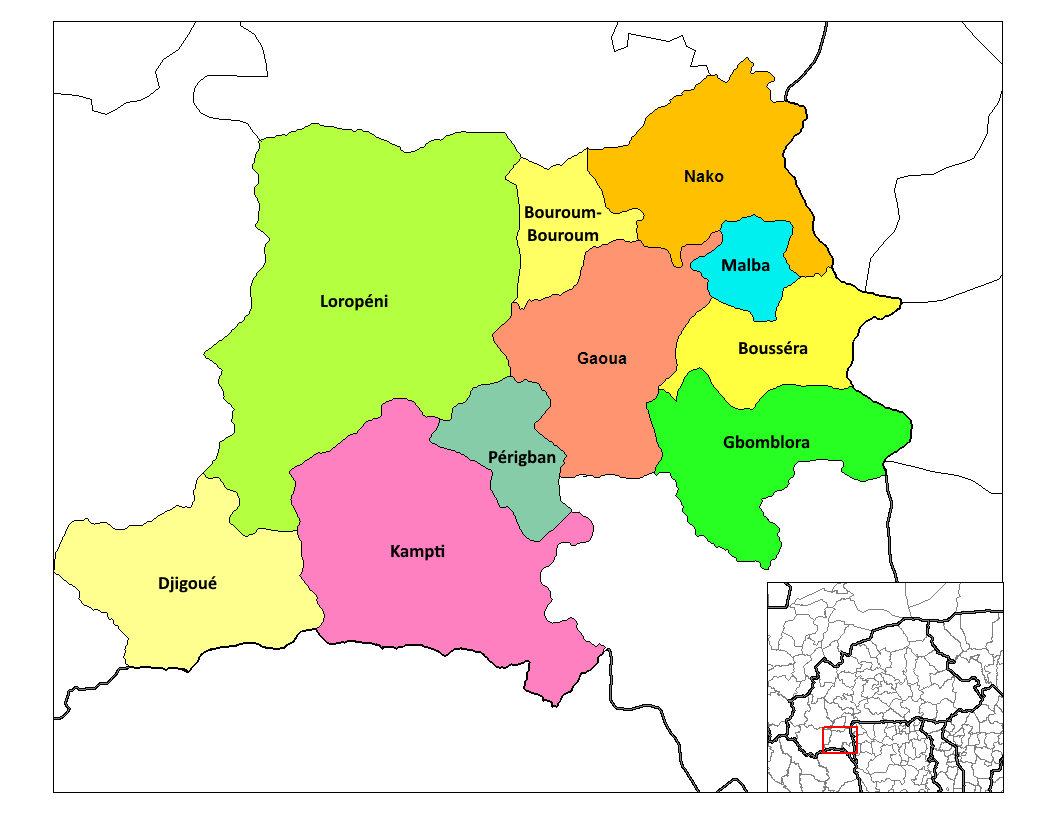
- Gbomblora Department location in the province
- Country: Burkina Faso
- Province: Poni Province

Area
  - Total: 260.4 sq mi (674.4 km^{2})

Population (2019 census)
  - Total: 25,169
  - Density: 96.66/sq mi (37.32/km^{2})
- Time zone: UTC+0 (GMT 0)

Gbomblora is a department or commune of Poni Province in southern Burkina Faso. Its capital lies at the town of Gbomblora.
