= Nako Department =

Coordinates: 10°38′N 3°04′W

Nako
- Department
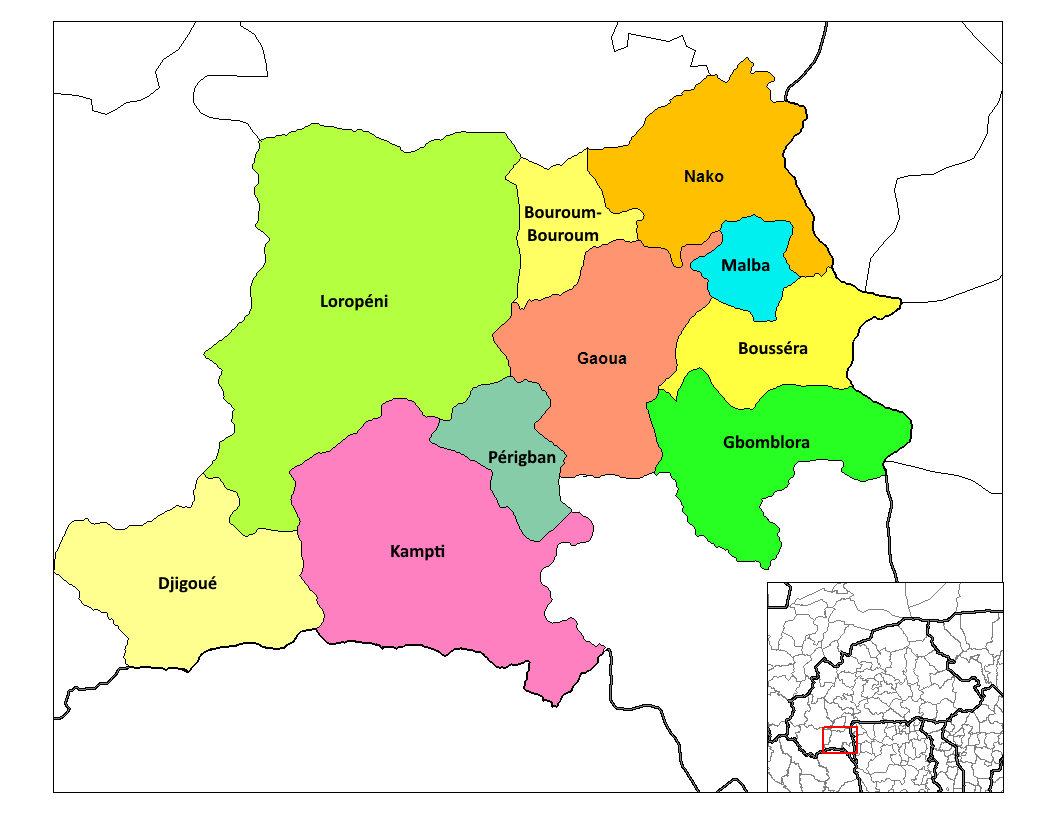
- Nako Department location in the province
- Country: Burkina Faso
- Province: Poni Province

Area
  - Total: 268.2 sq mi (694.6 km^{2})

Population (2019 census)
  - Total: 32,078
  - Density: 119.6/sq mi (46.18/km^{2})
- Time zone: UTC+0 (GMT 0)

Nako is a department or commune of Poni Province in southern Burkina Faso. Its capital lies at the town of Nako.
