= Gaoua Department =

Coordinates: 10.3333°N 3.18333°W

Gaoua
- Department
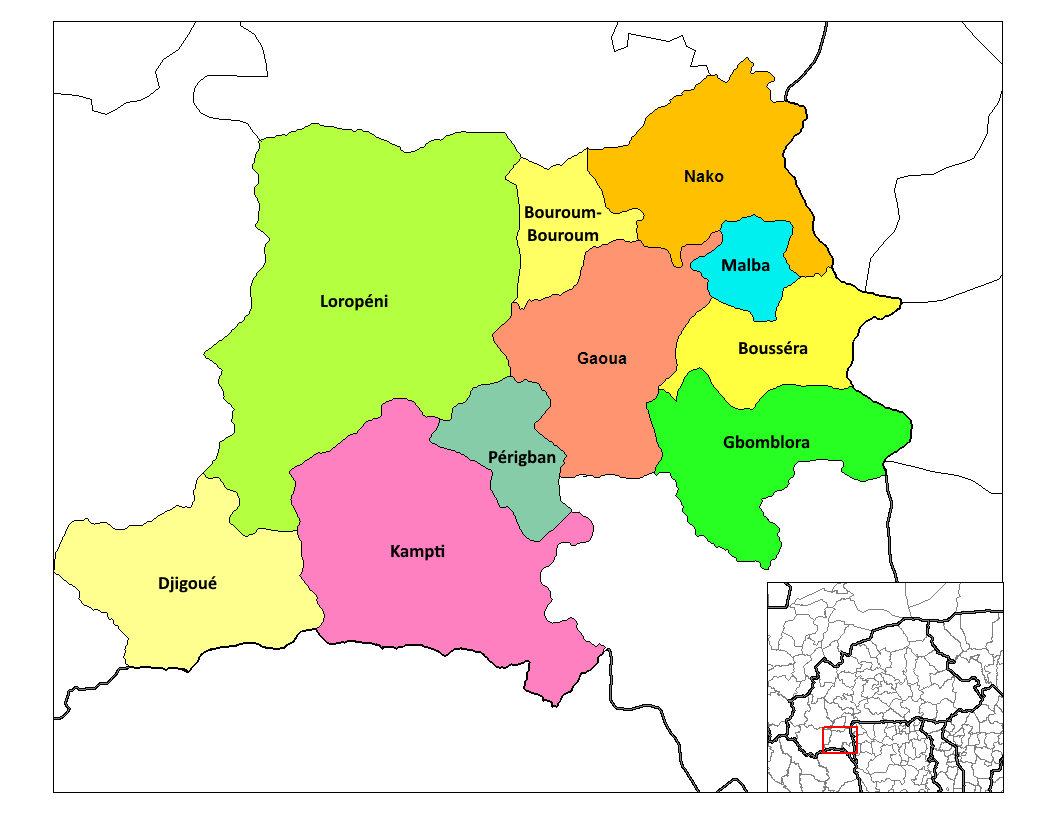
- Gaoua Department location in the province
- Country: Burkina Faso
- Province: Poni Province

Area
  - Department: 300 sq mi (780 km^{2})

Population (2019 census)
  - Department: 77,973
  - Density: 260/sq mi (100/km^{2})
  - Urban: 45,284
- Time zone: UTC+0 (GMT 0)

Gaoua is a department or commune of Poni Province in southern Burkina Faso. Its capital is the town of Gaoua.
