= Périgban Department =

Coordinates: 10.2333°N 3.3500°W

Périgban Pérignan
- Department
- Périgban
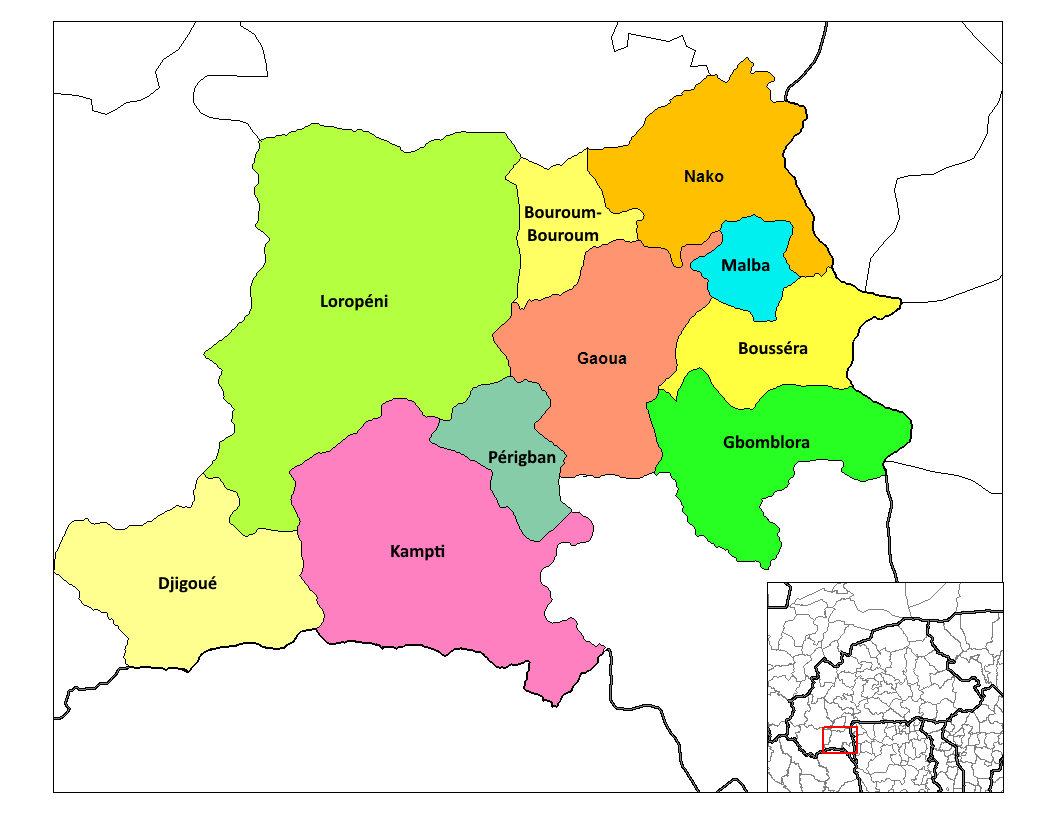
- Périgban Department location in the province
- Country: Burkina Faso
- Province: Poni Province

Area
  - Total: 116.3 sq mi (301.2 km^{2})

Population (2019 census)
  - Total: 9,922
  - Density: 85.32/sq mi (32.94/km^{2})
- Time zone: UTC+0 (GMT 0)

Périgban (or Pérignan) is a department or commune of Poni Province in southern Burkina Faso. Its capital lies at the town of Périgban (or Pérignan).
