= Eneti (company) =

Company specializing in offshore wind farm construction

Eneti, Inc.
- Formerly: Scorpio Bulkers
- Industry: offshore wind farm construction
- Founded: 2013; 13 years ago
- Headquarters: Monaco
- Key people: Emanuele A. Lauro (CEO)
- Owner: Independent (2013–23); Cadeler (2023–present)
- Website: www.eneti-inc.com

Eneti, previously Scorpio Bulkers, is a Monaco-based company specializing in offshore wind farm construction and services. Headquartered in Monaco, it is listed on the New York Stock Exchange and has Emanuele A. Lauro as its CEO.

On December 29, 2023, the firm was acquired by Cadeler.

== History ==
Scorpio Bulkers was founded in 2013 and completed its underwritten initial public offering on the New York Stock Exchange, or NYSE. In August 2020, the company announced its transition from the dry bulk commodity transportation business to marine-based renewable energy. The company’s decision to invest in a wind turbine installation vessel came as a surprise for the market.

In 2020 Scorpio Bulkers lost more than $600 million due to impairments on ships sold or put up for sale. Star Bulk took on seven Scorpio Bulkers’ ships seeking to capitalize on the company’s exit from dry bulk.

In February 2021, the company’s name change to Eneti Inc. was approved at an extraordinary general meeting. Company’s exit from dry bulk sector and name change is seen as a part of its transition to a sustainable future. Eneti’s Board of Directors authorized the company to sell its remaining dry bulk vessels during 2021.

The company signed shipbuilding contract with Daewoo Shipbuilding and Marine Engineering for the construction of two next generation wind turbine installation vessel to be delivered in 2024 and 2025.
