= Stone Energy Corporation =

Former American energy company

- Company type: Public
- Traded as: NYSE: SGY
- Founded: 1993
- Founder: James Hiram Stone
- Defunct: May 10, 2018
- Headquarters: 625 East Kaliste Saloom Road, Lafayette, Louisiana, United States
- Key people: David H. Welch (Chairman, Chief Executive Officer & President)
- Website: stoneenergy.com

The Stone Energy Corporation was an American oil and gas corporation based in Lafayette, Louisiana, United States. It was listed on the New York Stock Exchange under the listing SGY. The demise of Stone Energy ultimately was the oilfield crash of 2016 which resulted in oil prices plummeting $60–75 a barrel. Stone Energy was never able to fully recover from the 2016 crash due to bad drilling decisions from 2013 to 2016 and the resulting obligations from its attempt to test the waters of deepwater drilling. Stone was predominantly known for platform acquisition and well rework, not for drilling.

Stone Energy was acquired by Houston, Texas–based company Talos Energy on May 10, 2018.

== History ==
The Stone Energy Corporation was founded by James Hiram Stone in 1993. It operated in the Appalachian basin and the Gulf of Mexico.
