= Mining in Guyana =

Mining in Guyana is a significant contributor to the economy owing to sizable reserves of bauxite, gold, and diamonds. Much of these resources are found in Guyana's Hilly Sand and Clay belt, a region that makes up 20% of the country.

== Gold ==
In 2012, export receipts for gold amounted to US$1.5 billion, nearly half of the country's total export receipt value. All gold mined in the country must be sold to the Guyana Gold Board, and sent abroad for refining at the Royal Canadian Mint. The gold mining industry is made up of small and medium-scale operations that support as many as 12% of the population.

In the 16th century, European explorers were drawn to the Guianas due to rumors of a golden city called Manoa, ruled by the golden king El Dorado. This legend instigated settling of the region, but it wasn't until the 1840s when gold was found in significant quantities. After emancipation, small-scale gold mining was undertaken by many newly-freed Afro-Guyanese, who still make up a significant portion of the modern mining industry. Also known as pork-knockers, these artisanal gold and diamond miners have created or been a part of the folklore in Guyana.

In 1904, Peters Mine was the first mine opened in Guyana. From 1904 to 1909, it produced 39,800 ounces of gold (approximately 0.8 oz. per ton of ore), and in 1915 to 1916 produced another 1,103 ounces. Surveys conducted by U.S. geologists were favorable, but the mine was abandoned largely due to its inaccessibility. Nonetheless, it remained the biggest mining operation in Guyana until Omai Mine was opened in 1993. Peters Mine was obtained in 1996 by Guyana Goldfields.

Government initiatives have favored domestic gold mining operations, such as the 1989 Mining Act which encouraged many small-scale mining companies. When Omai Mine closed in 2005 it was ten years until the openings of two large-scale open pit mines in 2015: Aurora gold mine, a Canadian-owned operation and Troy Resources.

Guyana has not been immune to many of the struggles typical of resource rich countries. The price of gold attracts workers away from agriculture labor for quick gains, the result of which can have a detrimental effect on Guyana's overall economy. Boomtowns are often plagued with issues related to prostitution and excessive violence. Abandoned pits that accumulate water have become vector points for disease such as malaria and dengue.

Gold smuggling is a perennial issue. In 2016, the Minister of Natural Resources said that "approximately 15,000 ounces of gold is being smuggled from Guyana each week" with the possibility that gold from Columbia or Venezuela is also smuggled through the country's porous borders. Smugglers often go to Suriname to sell gold due to lower taxation of 1% tax and 2% royalty, compared to Guyana's 2% tax and 5% royalty. Brazil and the USA are also major destination points of smuggled gold. In 2012, US$11.5 million of gold was seized in Curacao.

Despite government enacting a ban on the use of mercury, it is still used for gold extraction by small-scale operations. A 1995 cyanide spill associated with large-scale gold mining at Omai Mines caused significant damage to the eco-system of the Highland region.

== Bauxite ==
Guyana's mines yield a high quality calcined bauxite, with uses in the refractory, abrasive and chemical markets for high temperature applications. Guyana's reserves of bauxite was known to be 350-million-tons. Major mining sites are at Linden, south of Georgetown, and Kwakwani on the Berbice River In 2016, 1,479,090 tonnes of bauxite was produced.

=== History ===
Upper Demerara-Berbice region in Guyana

Bauxite mining began in 1914 and took off in the 1920s with substantial investment from large-scale, foreign operations such as Demerara Bauxite Company (Demba) owned by Canada's Alcan, and Reynolds Bauxite Company owned by Reynolds Metals of the US. The first bauxite mine in the Upper Demerara-Berbice region opened in 1916. At that time, Guyana was still the British colony known as British Guiana. Aluminium became an important resource during the First World War as it was a key material to make aircraft, and so the global demand for bauxite increased, leading companies to expand development in Guyana. The British government was unwilling to allow Alcan to own the bauxite mines in Guyana because the United States was in control of the Canadian company. The British government was unsuccessful at preventing Alcan from legally owning the bauxite mines in Guyana due to the United States government threatening to cease providing Britain with weapons needed to fight in the war. The British Aluminium Company (B.A.C.) acquired leases to develop bauxite mines on the Christianburg land in Linden following World War I, in order to compete with Demba, who at the time, had control of the majority of bauxite in Guyana. In 1949, the B.A.C's leases were transferred to the Plantation Bauxite Company Ltd. and then transferred to Demba in 1957.

Bauxite production in the 1960s was around 3 million tons per year and by the early 1970s, the two companies made up 45 percent of the nation's foreign exchange earnings. After Guyana's independence from Britain, there was a political shift towards nationalizing these large, foreign-owned industries. The government of Guyana nationalized Demba in 1971. However, the resulting government-run industries suffered from poor management, commodity price fluctuation, and global competition and production fell to 1.3 million tons by 1988.

When privatization was used to improve economic prospects, majority shares were purchased once again by foreign companies. In 1985, Reynolds Bauxite Company was one of the first foreign companies to return, providing managerial assistance to Guymine at Kwakwani.

Omai Bauxite Company, owned by Canadian IAMGOLD, was bought in 2007 by BOSAI, a Chinese company. The other major mine in Berbice, formerly Aroaima Mining Company, is owned by Bauxite Company of Guyana Inc., a subsidiary of Russian-owned Rusal. The government maintains part ownership in both companies: 30% of Omai and 10% of Bauxite Company of Guyana.

First Bauxite Corporation made plans to develop mining at Bonasika in the Essequibo River, which after delays from lack of financing, started operations in 2020.

=== Aluminum ===
Guyana had one alumina plant for separating aluminum oxide from raw bauxite ore, but it closed in 1981 as a result of "inefficient management, declining world prices for bauxite, and prolonged strikes by workers". Prior to closure, production was about 300,000 tons processed per year.

=== Environmental impacts ===
Increases in bauxite production have led to bauxite dust air pollution in the Linden area by the facility.

Bauxite mining has impacted the rainforests and other habitats in Guyana through deforestation, habitat fragmentation, and soil degradation. Bauxite exports increased by 400% in Guyana during the Second World War, and so the environmental consequences became more severe due to the expanding industry. Tropical forests were cleared to create new mines and the Bayer process left behind red mud and air pollution.

The natural environment of the community Coomacka (Kumaka) in Upper Demerara-Berbice has been altered by bauxite mining. The construction of bauxite mines required sand to be cleared from the land, which eventually led to the formation of a sand beach by the Demerara River. The sand beach has increased flooding in Coomacka.

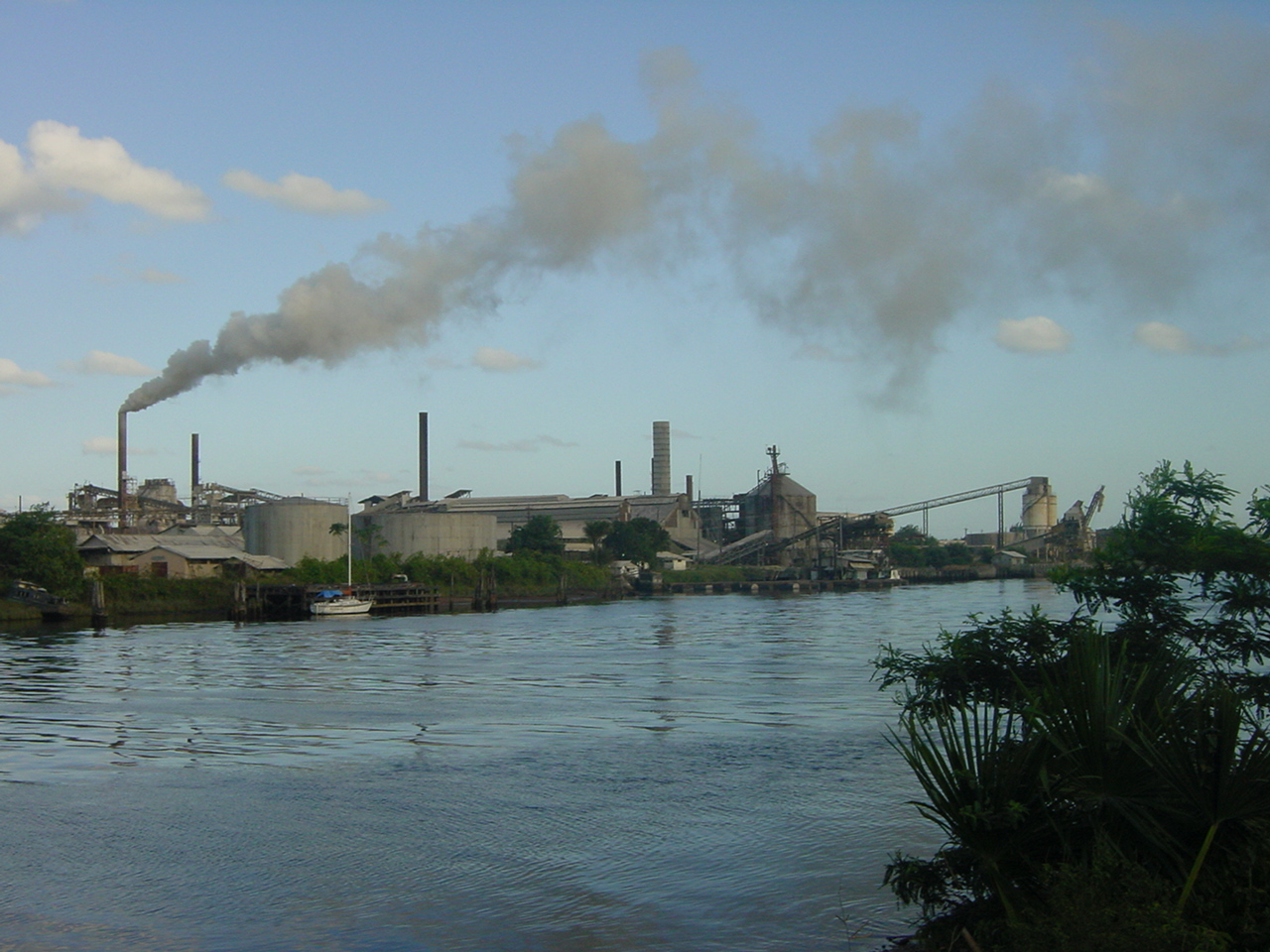
Bauxite plant in Linden, Guyana

The mining companies did not implement restoration measures for the natural environment after bauxite mines were closed in Linden, and so pit lakes exist in areas where open pit mines used to be. Pit lakes can have negative impacts on groundwater. In 2018, some pit lakes in Linden were found to have higher levels of aluminium, manganese, and iron, and they were found to be acidic.

=== Social impacts ===
The population of Upper Demerara-Berbice in 1960 was 17,553, with 38% of the people being local, and the other 62% having migrated to the area to seek work at the bauxite mines. The MacKenzie area of Upper Demerara-Berbice was socially and physically divided based on race during colonial rule of British Guiana. In 1960, about 74% of the white population resided in South MacKenzie, and 98% of the Black, brown, and mixed populations lived in North MacKenzie. The Demba company determined where the residents could live. The white population in South MacKenzie had larger houses that were built better and had sewage systems, whereas the houses in North MacKenzie were smaller and rarely had indoor bathrooms. The majority of non-manual jobs in MacKenzie were held by the white population, leaving the non-white population to have the lower-paid manual jobs.

The unequal working and living conditions the Black, brown, and mixed people of MacKenzie faced resulted in the formation of the British Guiana Labour Union (B.G.L.U.) in 1944. 1,900 workers were fired after the efforts to unionize in 1944. A 64-day strike in 1947 led to the union gaining official recognition, but this time under the British Guiana Mineworkers Union (G.M.W.U.). From 1962 to 1970, there were 47 strikes at Demba by the G.M.W.U. One notable strike was in 1964 when 3,000 employees went on strike for a week in response to a white employee calling the Afro-Guyanese workers "cannibals".

The 1981 closing of the Alumina Plant in Linden directly resulted in 1,600 people losing their jobs. By the 1980s, bauxite production had decreased, with around 600 workers being a part of the bauxite industry in Linden. Bauxite mining was the main industry in Linden, and so the reduction of bauxite mining led to many workers having to find employment outside of the city.

In 2009, 57 employees of the Bauxite Company of Guyana Inc. were fired for participating in a strike to campaign for higher wages and better workers' rights. The employees who were a part of the strike were unable to seek employment at other bauxite mines due to their participation.

US sanctions relating to Russian involvement in the 2016 elections has created issues.

== Diamonds ==
Guyana does not have a significant diamond cutting industry so nearly all exports are rough diamonds. In 2013, rough diamond exports totaled at US$12 million (144,000 Carats). The industry is mostly made up of medium-scale operations that use land dredging techniques however, diamond mining has been on the decline. Historical production totals are difficult to produce due to the high rates of smuggling due to factors similarly affecting the gold industry.

Diamond mining techniques are very similar to that of gold mining processes, so there is a substitution effect between gold and diamonds based on the commodity price.

== Other minerals ==
Other minerals that are mined in smaller scale include silica sand, shells, kaolin, semi-precious stone, and stone aggregate.

== Petroleum ==
In 2015, a major off-shore oilfield was discovered by Esso Exploration and Production Guyana Ltd. (a subsidiary of ExxonMobil of the United States, 45%; Hess Corporation of the United States, 30%; and CNOOC Ltd. of China, 25%). The Liza oilfield discovery was considered to be one of the biggest crude petroleum finds of the decade. In 2016, ExxonMobil announced Esso has discovered additional high-quality oil-bearing sandstone resources in the offshore Stabroek Block of the oilfield.

== Major Production Overview ==
Mining production, 2009-13
	2009	2010	2011	2012	2013
Gold (kg)	9,325.8	9,542.9	11,293.4	13,643.7	14,963.8
Bauxite (tonnes)	1,448,000	1,010,000	1,827,000	2,210,000	1,694,000
Diamond (carats)	143,900	49,900	52,300	40,700	55,927

== Important Organizations ==
- Guyana Geology and Mines Commission (GGMC)
- The Guyana Gold Board
- Guyana Gold and Diamond Miners Association (GGDMA)
- Guyana Bauxite and General Workers’ Union (GB&GWU)
