= Scorpio Tankers =

Tanker shipping company

Scorpio Tankers Inc. is a tanker shipping company founded by Emanuele A. Lauro on 1 July 2009. It is an international provider in the transportation of refined petroleum products. Scorpio Tankers is headquartered in Monaco and trades on the New York Stock Exchange. The company has the most LR2 tankers exposure of the public companies.

== History ==
In 1976, Italian businessman Glauco Lolli-Ghetti founded Scorpio Ship Management in New York and soon returned to Europe, settling in Monaco. In 2003, Scorpio Ship Management was headed by the businessman's grandson, 24-year-old Emanuele A. Lauro.

In 2009, the tanker fleet was separated into a separate structure, Scorpio Tankers. Scorpio Tankers was incorporated in the Republic of the Marshall Islands. Scorpio Tankers’ principal executive office is in Monaco with an office in New York, NY.

In April 2010, Scorpio Tankers completed its underwriting initial public offering on the New York Stock Exchange (NYSE) and its common shares are listed for trading on the NYSE as “STNG”. The company put up 12.5 million shares for sale at a starting price of $13. As a result, it raised about $150 million.

In 2014, Scorpio Tankers sold eight just built VLCCs, generating $50 million in net profit from the difference in price at the stage of ordering and the cost of the finished vessel.

In May 2017, the company signed a merger with Navig8 Product Tankers, acquiring their 27 recently built LR tankers. The deal made Scorpio Tankers the largest product tanker firm on a U.S. securities exchange.

In January 2021, Scorpio Tankers decided to sell and lease back one LR2 product tanker and three MR product tankers to China’s AVIC International Leasing. In March 2021, the company announced $138.2 million convertible note exchange and a new issuance.

== Fleet ==
The company currently owns or finance leases 128 product tankers:

- 42 LR2 tankers
- 12 LR1 tankers
- 56 MR tankers (including 4 newbuilds and 14 Handymax tankers)
- 3 MR tankers
- 7 Handymax tankers
