= Sequans =

French fabless company

Sequans Communications
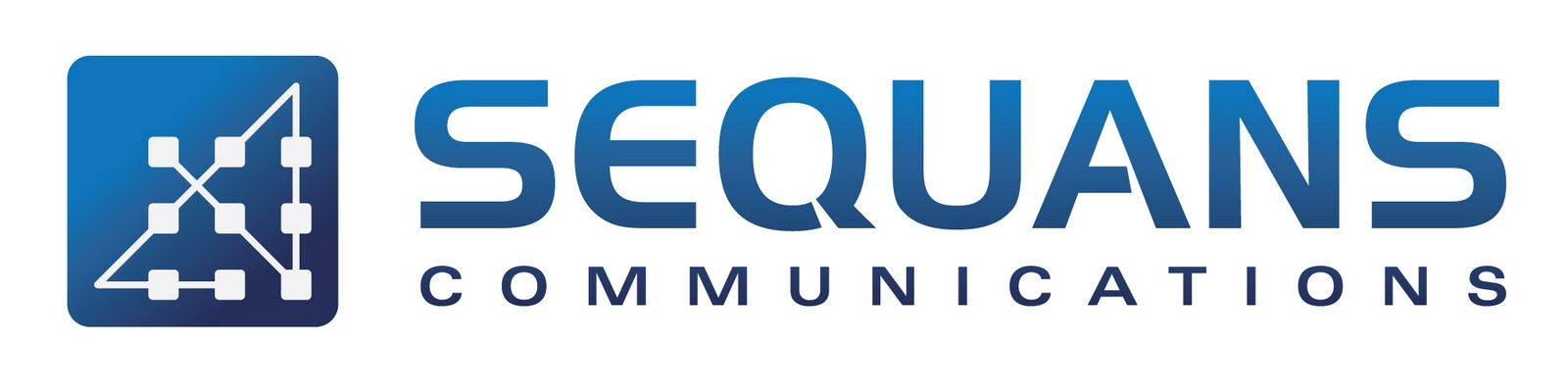
- Type: Public Company
- Traded as: NYSE: SQNS
- Industry: Electronics manufacturing
- Founded: 2003 in Paris, France
- Founder: Georges Karam
- Headquarters: Paris, France
- Key people: Georges Karam, Chief executive officer
- Products: Single mode LTE chips
- Number of employees: 200 (2013)
- Website: sequans.com

Sequans Communications is a fabless semiconductor company that designs, develops, and markets integrated circuits ("chips") and modules for 4G and 5G cellular IoT devices. The company is based in Paris, France with offices in the United States, United Kingdom, Israel, Hong Kong, Singapore, Taiwan, South Korea, Finland and China. The company was founded as a société anonyme in October 2003 by Georges Karam. It originally focused on the WiMAX market and expanded to the LTE market in 2009, dropping WiMAX altogether in 2011. Today the company develops and delivers only LTE chips and modules for the global 5G/4G cellular IoT market. Sequans was listed on the New York Stock Exchange in April 2011. Karam is the company's CEO.

Sequans designs and markets two families of LTE-only chips, one geared towards high bandwidth consumer devices like tablets and consumer internet access devices and the other for low power IoT devices.

== History ==
Sequans Communications was founded in October 2003 by Georges Karam. He had previously worked at Alcatel-Lucent, SAGEM, and Philips before helping found Pacific Broadband Communications in 2000. He joined Juniper Networks in 2001 when the company acquired Pacific Broadband Communications and served as Juniper Network's Vice President of Engineering and General Manager for Europe until leaving the firm to found Sequans.

In 2006, Sequans raised $24 million in venture capital in a funding round that was led by Kennet Venture Partners. It closed another funding round led by Reliance Venture that was joined by Alcatel-Lucent, Motorola, SAGEM, and others in 2007.

Sequans was originally focused on the WiMAX chipset market and had more than seven WiMAX chips on the market by 2008. It expanded to the LTE market in 2009. Sequans was listed by the New York Stock Exchange under the ticker symbol SQNS in April 2011. A few months later, in September, the Chinese Ministry of Industry and Information Technology approved Sequans' LTE technology for use in the country. The company released its first LTE chipset to market in 2012.

One of Sequans' SteamrichLTE chips was certified by Verizon Wireless for use in devices on its LTE network in January 2013. In February, Sequans was ranked the third overall LTE Baseband Supplier by ABI Research and the company released its EZLinkLTE modules in May of that year. The EZLinkLTE modules, one of the first to support LTE bands 4 and 13, were built on the Sequans Mont Blanc chip that was previously certified by Verizon. In October 2013, two of the company's EZLinkLTE modules were certified by Verizon Wireless for use in tablets and mobile computers that run on Verizon's LTE network.

In January 2014, Sequans was one of two LTE chipmakers to provide technology to Verizon for its LTE Multicast demonstration at the 2014 Super Bowl. That same month Sequans' EZLinkLTE module was selected by KD Interactive to provide LTE connectivity to its Kurio 7 4G LTE Android tablet. In April, China Telecom announced that its LTE-only modems would include Sequans' single-mode TD-LTE CPE units. The company's EZlinkLTE module was selected for Best Buy's first LTE Insignia tablet in November 2014.

In February 2016, the company partnered with Verizon to enhance LTE Cat-M development and announced the Monarch chip, a Cat-M1 and Cat-NB1 3GPP LTE Release 13 Advanced Pro compliant platform. Sequans Calliope Cat-1 LTE chipset was certified for use on NTT DoCoMo's network in March 2016. The same chipset was certified by Verizon to support its Voice-over-LTE applications in April 2016. In May 2016, the European Aviation Network selected the Sequans' LTE chipset to provide European aircraft with onboard internet access to passengers. That same month, the company's EZLink LTE module was certified for use on AT&T's 4G LTE network.

In November 2016, Verizon conducted the first over-the-air data call using a Sequans Cat-M1 chip in a prototype. That same month, Gemalto partnered with Sequans to produce a Cat-M1 IoT solution, and the company's Monarch chipset was used by NimbeLink in its Cat-M1 embedded cellular modem. In January 2017, Gemalto debuted the EMS31 LTE Cat M1 module based on Sequans Monarch chip and NimbeLink, LinkLabs, and Encore Networks announced that their LTE CAT M1 devices based on Sequans' Monarch chips were certified by Verizon Wireless.

In 2017, Sequans opened an R&D facility and added staff in Sophia Antipolis for the purpose of accelerating 4G/5G cellular IoT solutions development. In March 2017, Verizon announced the launch of the industry's first LTE Category M1 nationwide network for IoT, enabled by several technology partners, of which Sequans was one of the chip providers. In April 2017, it was announced that Sequans’ chip is providing the connectivity for Verizon's newly available Ellipsis Jetpack mobile router. Following in May, AT&T announced the nationwide launch of its LTE Cat M1 network, with Sequans as one of its chip providers. AT&T then announced the certification of Sequans Calliope US130Q module in September and Monarch Cat M1 chipset in December. Today, Sequans Monarch and Calliope chips and modules are certified by leading operators worldwide in USA, Canada, Europe, Asia, Australia.

In January 2018, Sercomm adopted Sequans’ Monarch to technology to connect one of the industry's first LTE IoT buttons that can programmed for various tasks such as ordering, alerting, or maintenance. In March 2018, Skyworks and Sequans Launched a jointly-developed LTE-M/NB-IoT connectivity solution that combined Sequans Monarch chip with Skyworks front end module. Trackimo adopted this solution for its IoT tracker devices. In June, Sequans and Japan Radio Company jointly developed a CPE based on Sequans’ Cassiopeia LTE Cat 6 platform for Japan's public safety market, In October, Ligado executed deals with Sequans and Ericsson to build equipment for satellite and 5G services.

In January 2019, Polymer Logistics (since acquired by Tosca) adopted Sequans Monarch technology for pallet tracking, and in February 2019, Sequans executed a deal with STMicroelectronics to bring LTE IoT connectivity to STMicro's MCUs (microcontroller units). The companies developed an extension board to enable the addition of LTE-M connectivity to STMicro's STM32 discovery boards. In March 2019, Sequans inked another satellite deal with Lockheed Martin to develop LTE for satellite technologies in support of applications that require space-based, connectivity, such as needed for shipping and navigation.

In January 2020, Sequans opened an R&D center in Israel specifically to support and accelerate development of its 5G products, including the 5G-compliant Monarch LTE-M/NB-IoT solutions and the new Taurus 5G chip. Sequans established an MCU partnership with Microchip whereby its Monarch technology is integrated with Microchip's MCU solutions. Sequans built in partnership with Verizon a new solution called Monarch Go that integrates Sequans connectivity module with an already tuned antenna and a Verizon SIM, simplifying the design process for IoT device makers, The solution subsequently won an “IoT Innovations Award” from Connected World Magazine and was then adopted by Avnet to build a new development kit. In April 2020 Samea integrated Sequans’ Monarch module into its smart building sensor, and in May 2020, CoreKinect adopted Sequans Monarch technology to connect its new line of Zenith™ asset tracking solutions. Following earlier deals with NXP and Microchip, Sequans inked another MCU partnership deal with Renesas in October for LTE-M solutions and then expanded the deal In January 2021 to include 5G solutions. That same year, Sequans introduced the second generation of its Monarch technology that features a 60 percent improvement in power consumption over first generation Monarch and adds integrated MCU, and high level EAL5+ security for integrated SIM.

In January 2021, Sequans and e-Peas demonstrated energy harvesting as applied to IoT communications module, using Sequans Monarch platform and e-Peas IC, demonstrating the ability of energy harvesting to power IoT devices indefinitely without batteries. early 2021, Withings adopted Sequans Monarch 2 technology to build its next generation of ehealth devices, stating that it selected Monarch 2 because of its “unmatched low power consumption and small form factor.” Sequans also announced in early 2021 the second generation of its Calliope LTE Cat 1 chip, which delivers a data rate higher than Monarch for LTE IoT devices using audio or voice that need a higher rate. In February, the French government announced funding for new national industrial 5G projects and Sequans was one of the recipients. Sequans was awarded 8.45 million euros. The prefect, Laurent Hottiaux, declared that Sequans is a “source of local pride.” In April 2021, Sequans secured $50 million in new financing to support 5G development. In May, AmericanPharma adopted Sequans’ Monarch technology for an LTE-M based monitoring system for COVID-19 shipments and storage in the US. In June, Sequans’ CBRS modules were adopted by BEC Technologies and Amit for distance learning devices used in private networks running on CBRS spectrum. In October, Qastle announced that it had adopted Sequans Monarch Go solution for its new Smart Alarm Controller, And JACS announced it is using Sequans Cassiopeia CBRS module to connect its new ruggedized 4G tablet.

In December 2021, Sequans delivered the industry's first GSMA-compliant integrated SIM (iUICC), which is Common Criteria certified and available on its Monarch 2 LTE-M/NB-IoT chip. The company also announced the availability of integrated GNSS on Monarch 2 via partnership with Nestwave. Sequans then partnered with EchoStar, a leading satellite operator, to provide LTE band 65 support on its Cassiopeia platform, thus enabling satellite/LTE communications on Echostar's network.

In January 2022, Sequans was selected by Ubiik to supply connectivity for Taiwan Power Company's advanced metering infrastructure (AMI) network. In April, Sequans was selected by Infrafon to provide the connectivity for its Smart Badge, which is an intelligent name tag with smartphone functions that can be worn on clothing as a wearable.

== See also ==
- WiMAX
- LTE technology
