= Guyana Goldfields =

Canadian mining company

- Company type: Public
- Traded as: TSX: GUY
- Industry: Mining
- Fate: Acquired by Zijin Mining
- Headquarters: Toronto, Ontario, Canada
- Key people: Patrick Sheridan Jr. (CEO 1996-2013); Scott Caldwell (2013-20); Alan Pangbourne (2020)
- Products: Gold
- Subsidiaries: Guygold (Barbados) Inc. Aurora Gold (Barbados) Inc. AGM Inc. (Guyana)
- Website: guygold.com

Guyana Goldfields was a Canadian company that owned and operated the Aurora gold mine in Guyana. Before being acquired by Zijin Mining in 2020, Guyana Goldfields was a publicly traded company with shares listed on the Toronto Stock Exchange and previously TSX Venture Exchange. Beginning in 1996 the company acquired exploration rights to the former Peters and Aurora mines with the objective of utilizing modern exploration technology to re-evaluate the potential gold reserves. Following positive exploratory results, the company received financing from the International Finance Corporation and other investors and conducted economic and technical feasibility studies. The Aurora gold mine began commercial production in 2015 and has produced approximately 125,000 to 160,000 ounces of gold per year from the mine since then. These lower than expected results and a revised technical study that significantly lowered the recoverable reserves estimates, led to the removal of the CEO and directors involved in making the investment decision and a class action lawsuit alleging misrepresentations in public disclosures.

== Operations ==
Guyana Goldfields owned and operated the Aurora Gold Mine in the Cuyuni-Mazaruni region, along the Cuyuni River, of Guyana. Guyana Goldfields oversaw its development in 2014–15. While they produced 35,901 ounces of gold in 2015, commercial production began in January 2016. The mine produced 151,600 ounces in 2016 as the company again transitioned to a company focused on mine operation. During 2017, 160,500 ounces were produced, 150,450 ounces were produced in 2018 and 124,200 in 2019. It is an open pit mine that uses a semi-autogenous mill and carbon in pulp processing. The company's March 2020 updated life of mine plan estimated 2.2 million ounces of proven and probable reserves where the gold is dispersed at an average 2.7 grams per tonnes of ore. The plan estimated a 14-year mine life assuming the transition to underground mining can be achieved.

The company also investigated the feasibility of developing its Aranka/Sulphur Rose deposit, located 23 km from the Aurora mine, as well as exploring at other properties in Guyana.

== History ==
In 1996-97 the company acquired exploration rights to the Peters Mine and Aurora Mine properties which had last produced gold in the early 1900s.

The company had also acquired exploration rights to the Coronation Gulf project near the Coppermine River in Nunavut, Canada, which had last been explored in 1967-69 but moved that property in 2000 to a subsidiary company called Coppercorp, and later to Coronation Minerals (later renamed Guyana Precious Metals and then GPM Metals Inc.) which would be separately listed on the TSX Venture Exchange.

The company's stock price rose from $0.70 per share in May to $3.50 in November, as Goldcorp bought into the company, that acquiring 8.7% of its shares. Over several years, as the studies outlined the feasibility of mining and they were issued a license to mine, the company was considered for acquisition by larger companies experienced in developing and operating gold mines, such as Agnico-Eagle Mines, however, the deals did not take place and Guyana Goldfields transitioned from a mineral exploration focus to a mine development company and sold some of its non-core assets to focus on its Aurora and Aranka deposits.

They raised sufficient funds to pay for the mine through private placements, stock offerings, and borrowings, much of it from International Finance Corporation and Export Development Canada. In August 2015, Guyana announced its first gold production at its Aurora mine and began commercial Commercial production started in January 2016.

Guyana Goldfields was listed on the S&P/TSX Composite Component from June 2016 to Dec 2018.

In 2020 both TSX-listed Silvercorp Metals and Shanghai Stock Exchange-listed Zijin Mining made bids to acquire Guyana Goldfields. Zijin outbid Silvercorp with a C$323 million all-cash deal and the acquisition was completed in August 2020.

== See also ==
- Mining in Guyana
