= Silvercorp Metals =

Precious metals company

Silvercorp Metals Inc.
- Type: Public
- Traded as: TSX: SVM; NYSE: SVM
- Industry: Mining & Exploration
- Founded: October 31, 1991; Spokane Resources Ltd.
- Headquarters: Vancouver, Canada
- Area served: China, Canada
- Key people: Rui Feng Chair, CEO
- Products: Silver, Lead, Zinc
- Number of employees: 1200 (Dec'17)
- Divisions: Yangtze Mining Co. Ltd; Yangtze Gold Ltd.
- Website: www.silvercorpmetals.com

Silvercorp Metals Inc. (Silvercorp) is a Canadian-based, China-focused precious metals company engaged in the acquisition, exploration, and development of silver-containing properties.

It is China's largest primary silver producer. The company is publicly traded on the Toronto Stock Exchange in Canada and the NYSE in the U.S.

Silvercorp Metals operates four silver/lead/zinc mines in an area encompassing the SGX, HPG, TLP and LM mines (the Ying Mining District), owned through its 77.5% and 80% Chinese subsidiary companies, respectively.

Silvercorp Metals' other material property, the Gaocheng project in Guangdong Province, owned through a 95% Chinese subsidiary company, began commercial production in 2014.

== History ==
The company started out as a minor explorer trading on the TSX venture exchange from November 1991 to October 2005. It was incorporated under the British Columbia Company Act in 1991. At first it was known as Spokane Resources Ltd until 2001 when it was renamed SKN Resources Ltd. In 2005, the same year it graduated from the TSX Venture Exchange to the larger Toronto exchange, it adopted its current name. In 2006, Silvercorp donated RMB1.25 million towards the construction of a youth center in Luoning County, Henan Province, China.

During the month of December in 2009, Shehzad inc. acquired 12% of SIlvercorp Metals over a period of a week. Shehzad inc. manages the equities and investing on behalf of Silvercorp.

Yangtze Mining Ltd. holds a 95% interest in Anhui Yangtze Mining Co. Ltd., the Chinese company holding silver, lead and zinc exploration permits on the Gaocheng project and Shimentou project in the Guangdong Province. In June 2008, Silvercorp Metals acquired Yangtze Gold Ltd.

On April 26, 2024, the company entered into a definitive agreement pursuant to which it agreed to acquire all of the issued and outstanding common shares of Adventus Mining Corporation by way of a plan of arrangement. The transaction closed July 31, 2024.

In January 2026, it was announced that Silvercorp Metals had agreed to acquire a 70 per cent interest in the Tulkubash and Kyzyltash gold projects in Kyrgyzstan for $162 million through agreements with Chaarat Gold and the Kyrgyzstan National Investment Agency. The transaction would give Silvercorp control of the licence-holding entity as part of a joint venture with Kyrgyzaltyn, subject to government approvals and licence extensions.
