= Poni Province =

Poni
- Province
- Location in Burkina Faso

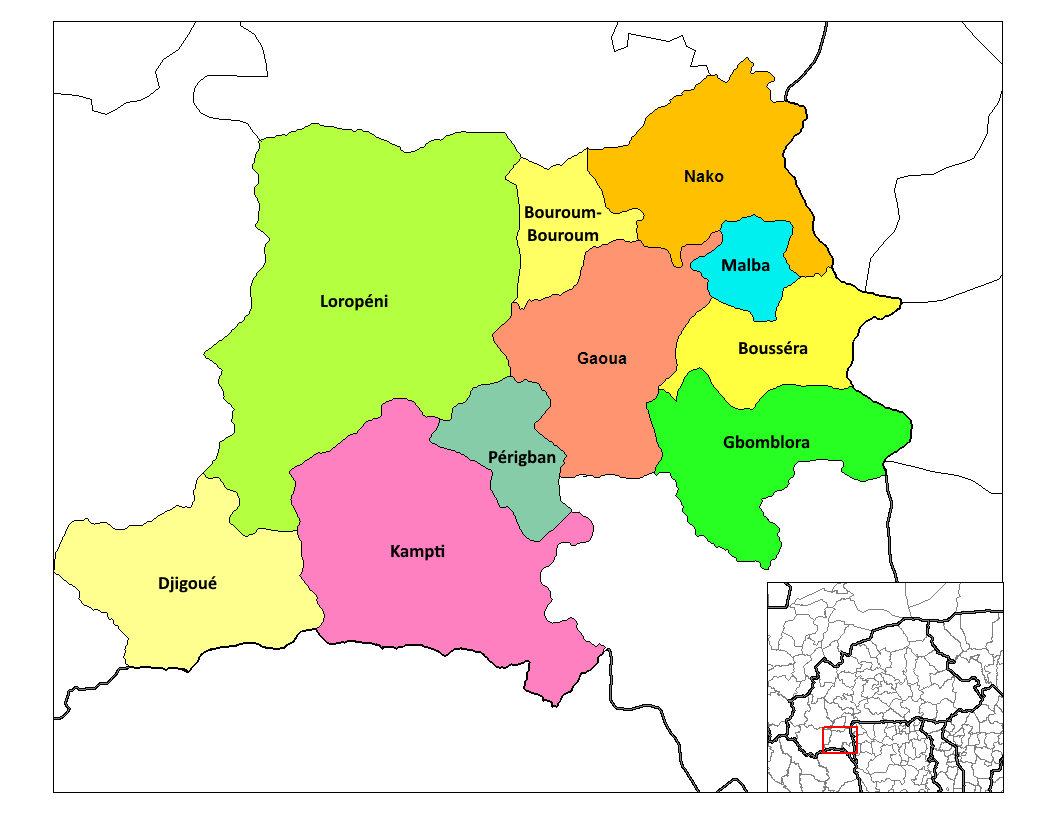
- Provincial map of its departments
- Coordinates: 12°19′N 2°28′E
- Country: Burkina Faso
- Region: Sud-Ouest Region
- Capital: Gaoua

Area
  - Province: 7,351 km^{2} (2,838 sq mi)

Population (2019 census)
  - Province: 355,665
  - Density: 48.38/km^{2} (125.3/sq mi)
  - Urban: 45,284
- Time zone: UTC+0 (GMT 0)

Poni is one of the 45 provinces of Burkina Faso, located in its Sud-Ouest Region.

Its capital is Gaoua.

== Departments ==
Poni is divided into 10 departments:

- Bouroum-Bouroum
- Bousséra
- Djigoué
- Gaoua
- Gbomblora
- Kampti
- Loropéni
- Malba
- Nako
- Périgban (or Pérignan)

== Places of interest ==
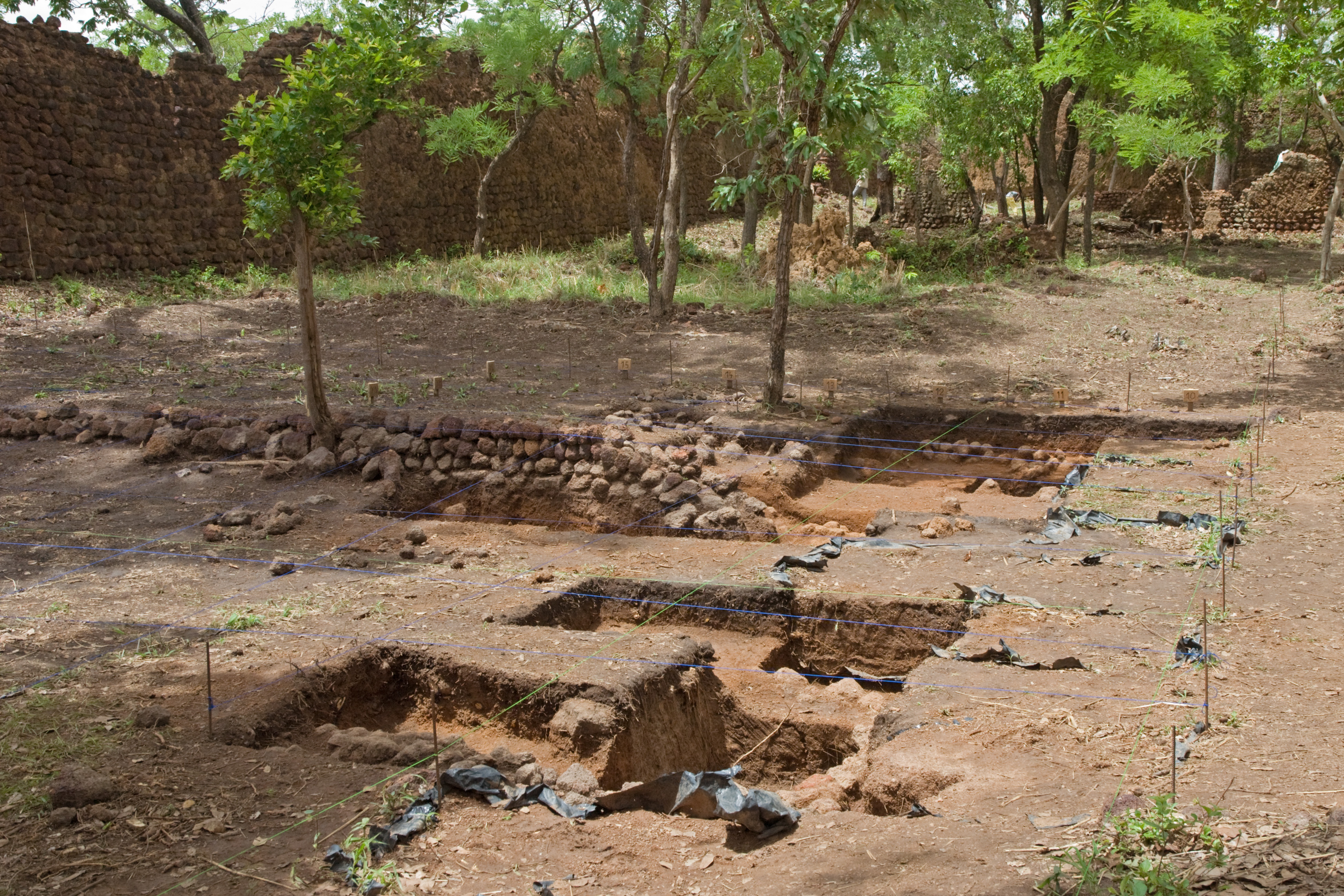
The Ruins of Loropéni

Poni Province is home to Burkina Faso's first UNESCO World Heritage site, the Ruins of Loropéni, which was added to the UNESCO World Heritage List in 2009.

== See also ==
- Regions of Burkina Faso
- Provinces of Burkina Faso
- Departments of Burkina Faso
