= Gaoua =

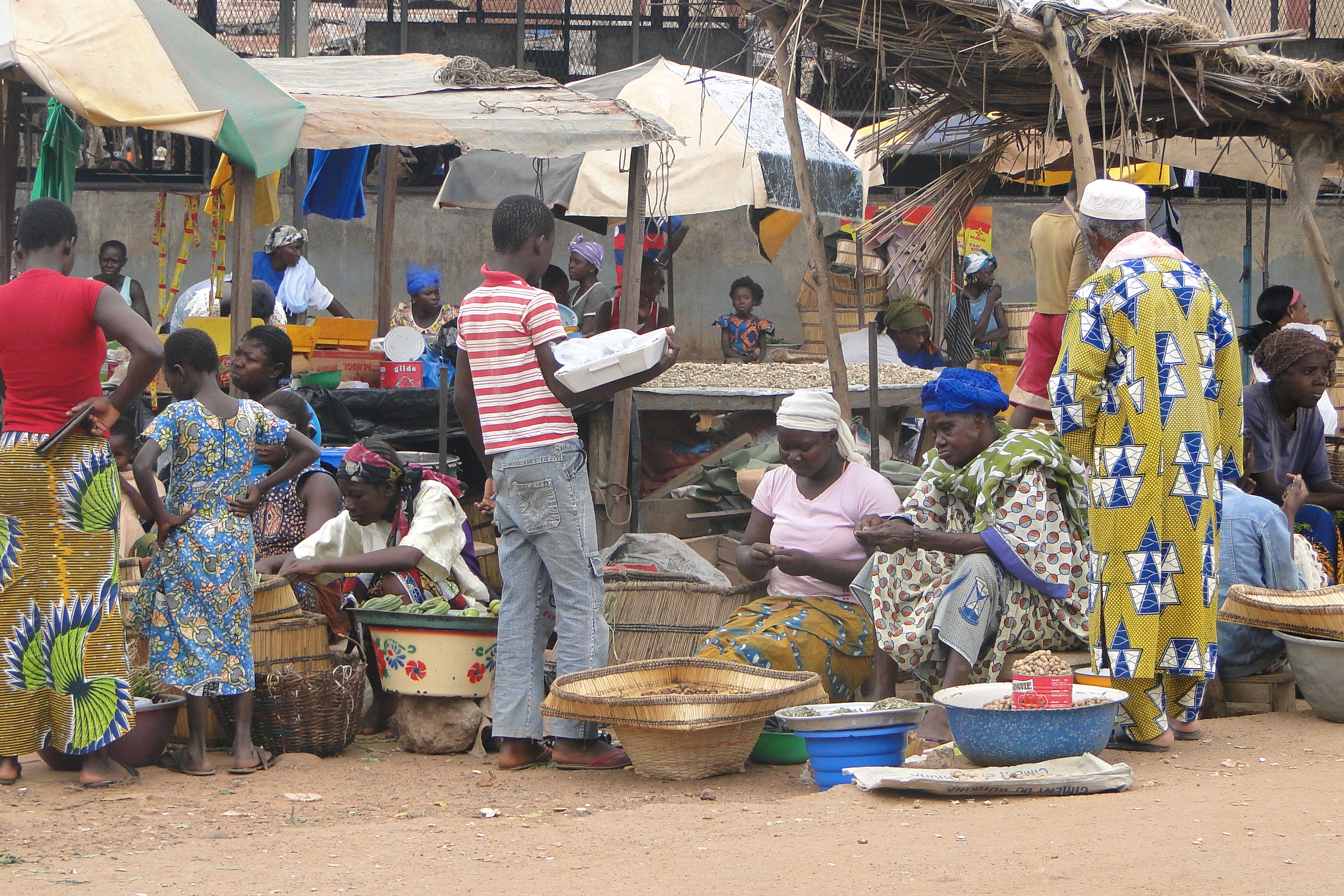
- Market Scene in Gaoua

- Location within Burkina Faso, West Africa
- Coordinates: 10°19′N 3°10′W
- Country: Burkina Faso
- Region: Sud-Ouest Region
- Province: Poni Province
- Department: Gaoua Department
- Elevation: 339 m (1,112 ft)

Population (2019 census)
  - Total: 45,284
- Time zone: UTC+0 (GMT)

Gaoua is a market town in southern Burkina Faso. The population was 45,284 in a 2019 census. Located in the red earth, green hills, and fast flowing streams of southwestern Burkina Faso, Gaoua is the capital of Poni Province and forms a sort of capital for the sacred rites and bush lore of the Lobi peoples. According to local myth, Gaoua was founded when the Lobi migrated across from northern Ghana where they found the Gan people occupying the territory. As a result, they named the trek across to Gaoua Gan-houo meaning "route of the Gan people".

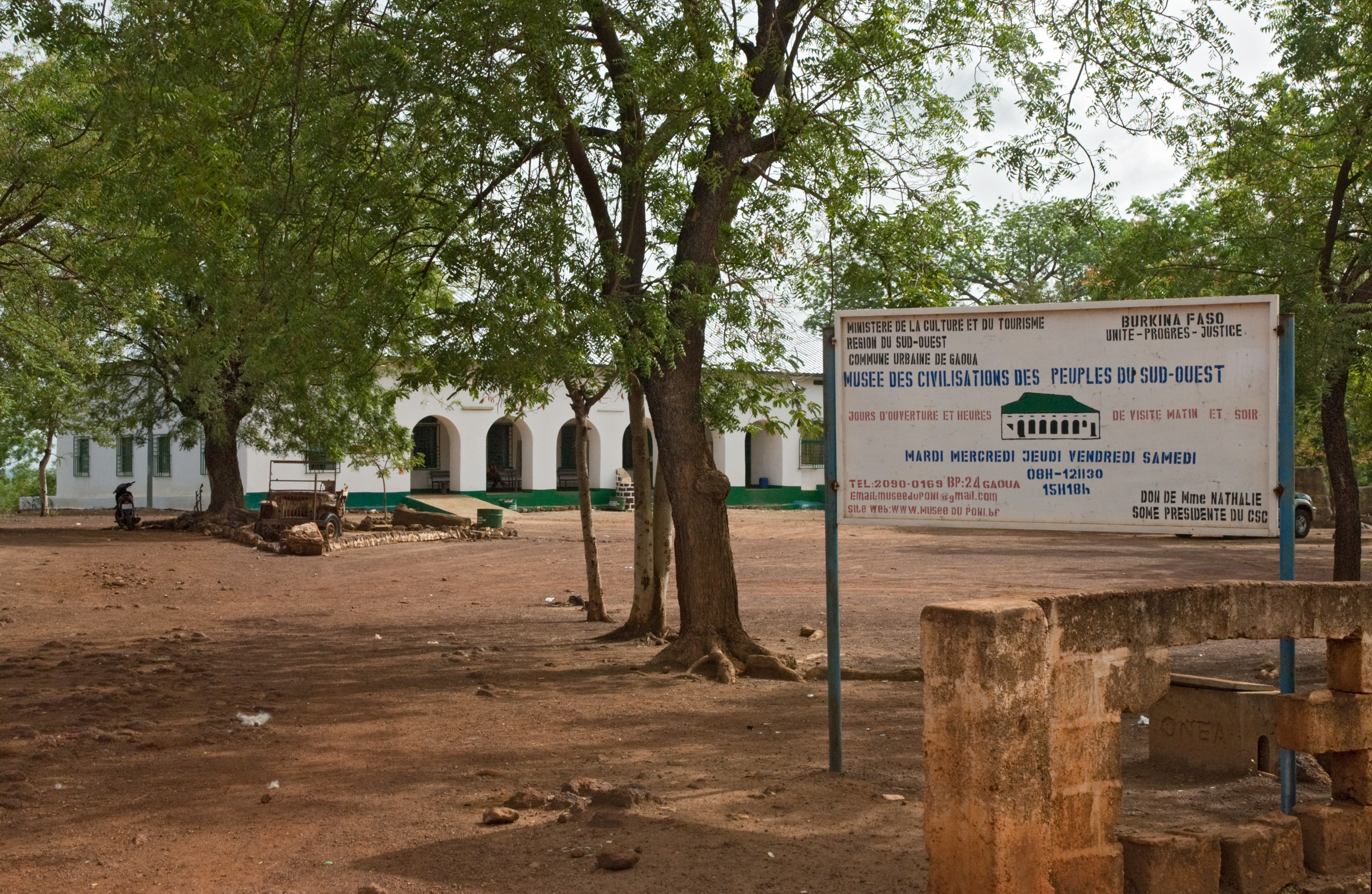
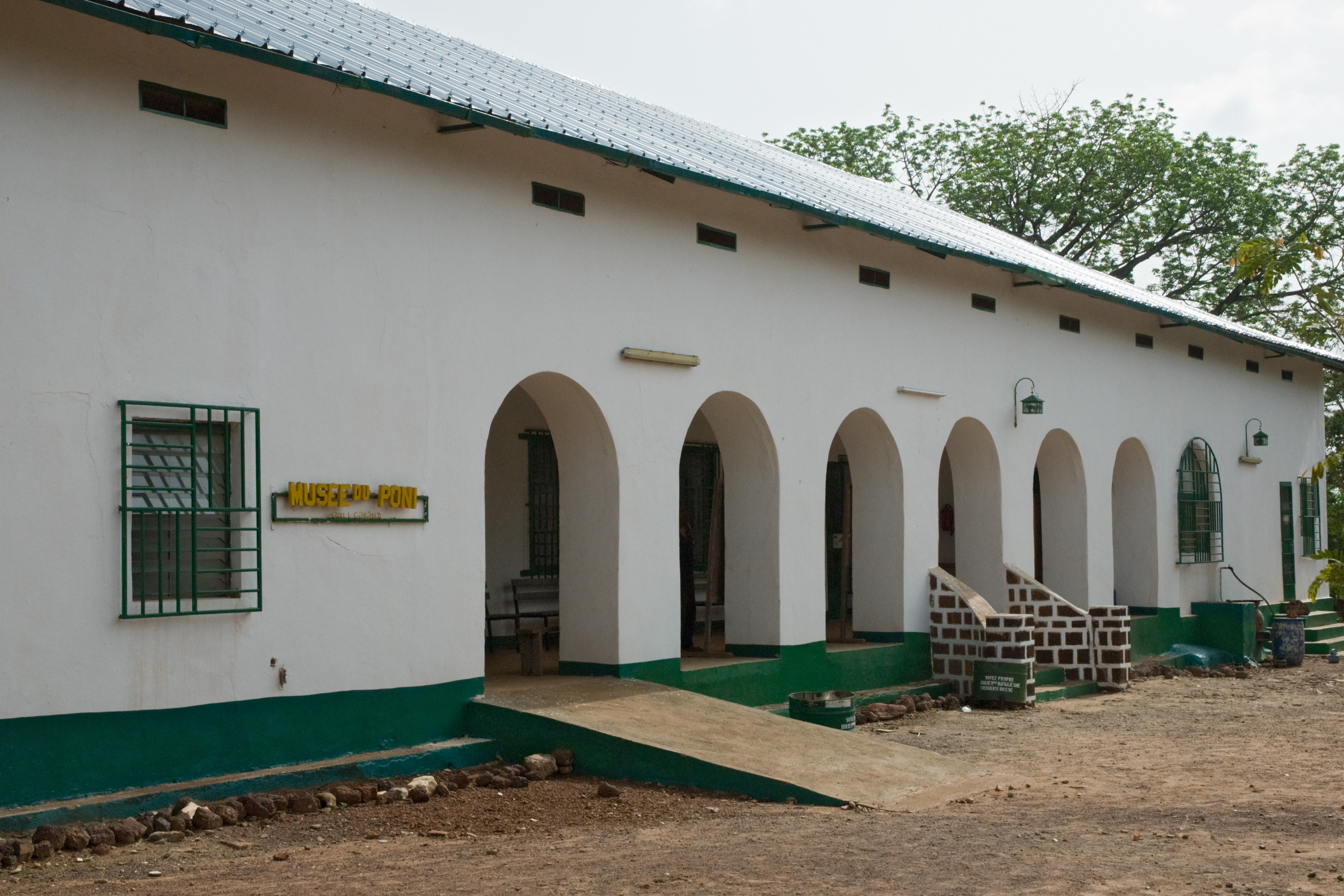
Entrance (left) and front (right) of the Musée du Poni (May 2016)

Attractions in the town include a sacred grove of trees, the Poni Museum (Musée des Civilisations des Peuples du Sud-Ouest or Musée du Poni) and caves. There is also a mosque on elevated ground near the centre. The Gaoua Catholic parish Church of the Sacred Heart will be the cathedral for the newly erected Catholic Diocese of Gaoua.

== Lobi Goldfields ==
Though their ancient home was considered to be Takyiman in Ghana, the Lobi migrated across the Mouhoun River as a result of the Dagomba Wars in the 1770s. Thirty years later, the Lobi displaced the Gan at Gaoua. The French occupied southwest Burkina Faso in 1879, based on the region's reputation for gold, dating back to the era of Mossi and Dyula gold traders. Although primarily farmers, the Lobi did partake of gold panning around Gaoua, besides Gaoua being on a trade route to the Poura gold mines further north.

== Climate ==
Gaoua has a tropical savanna climate (Köppen Aw), typical of the Sudan region of West Africa. The weather is hot year-round, and sweltering in the period before the rainy season begins from February to May. In the rainy season itself temperatures are less extreme due to increased cloud cover, but high humidity means this period is no less uncomfortable. At the height of the dry season in December and January temperatures remain hot to sweltering by afternoon, but humidity is at its lowest and mornings fall to pleasant temperatures.

Climate data for Gaoua (1991–2020)
Month	Jan	Feb	Mar	Apr	May	Jun	Jul	Aug	Sep	Oct	Nov	Dec	Year
Record high °C (°F)	40.0 (104.0)	42.2 (108.0)	42.6 (108.7)	42.0 (107.6)	40.1 (104.2)	38.9 (102.0)	36.0 (96.8)	34.8 (94.6)	36.2 (97.2)	37.5 (99.5)	39.0 (102.2)	38.4 (101.1)	42.6 (108.7)
Mean daily maximum °C (°F)	34.5 (94.1)	36.8 (98.2)	38.1 (100.6)	36.8 (98.2)	34.9 (94.8)	32.5 (90.5)	30.8 (87.4)	30.0 (86.0)	31.2 (88.2)	33.8 (92.8)	35.7 (96.3)	35.0 (95.0)	34.2 (93.6)
Daily mean °C (°F)	25.5 (77.9)	28.4 (83.1)	30.8 (87.4)	30.6 (87.1)	29.3 (84.7)	27.6 (81.7)	26.2 (79.2)	25.6 (78.1)	26.0 (78.8)	27.1 (80.8)	26.9 (80.4)	25.4 (77.7)	27.4 (81.3)
Mean daily minimum °C (°F)	16.3 (61.3)	19.8 (67.6)	24.0 (75.2)	25.5 (77.9)	24.7 (76.5)	23.4 (74.1)	22.7 (72.9)	22.3 (72.1)	22.2 (72.0)	22.2 (72.0)	19.5 (67.1)	16.1 (61.0)	21.6 (70.9)
Record low °C (°F)	10.6 (51.1)	12.6 (54.7)	15.5 (59.9)	18.4 (65.1)	17.0 (62.6)	17.9 (64.2)	18.1 (64.6)	16.0 (60.8)	16.2 (61.2)	15.5 (59.9)	12.1 (53.8)	9.5 (49.1)	9.5 (49.1)
Average rainfall mm (inches)	2.6 (0.10)	9.4 (0.37)	28.8 (1.13)	79.8 (3.14)	122.9 (4.84)	134.3 (5.29)	186.1 (7.33)	235.9 (9.29)	191.7 (7.55)	92.5 (3.64)	13.4 (0.53)	0.1 (0.00)	1,097.5 (43.21)
Average rainy days (≥ 1.0 mm)	0.1	0.7	2.1	5.1	8.1	9.2	11.2	13.2	14.0	7.9	1.1	0.1	72.8
Mean monthly sunshine hours	271.1	242.9	246.4	235.8	252.7	234.6	206.0	171.9	194.1	253.0	268.8	278.8	2,856.1
Source: NOAA

== See also ==
- Birimian
- Geology of Burkina Faso
