= Canada–Mali relations =

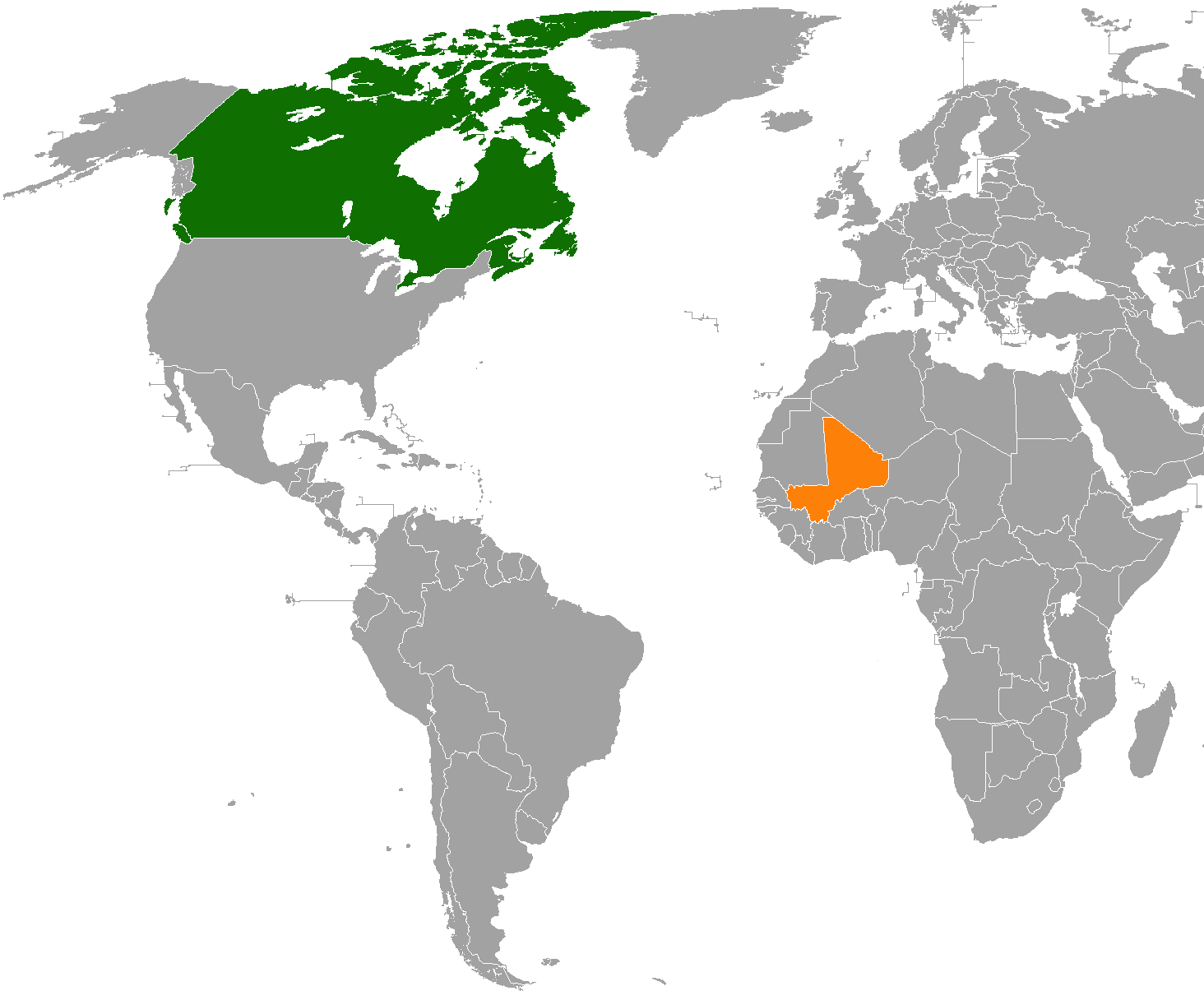

- Canada: Mali

Canada and Mali established diplomatic relations in 1972.

Canada is a significant foreign aid donor and Canadian companies have provided technical and other assistance to Mali. Canadian companies have also significantly invested in Mali's mining sector. Canada has also channeled aid indirectly to Mali via multilateral institutions including the World Bank and agencies of the United Nations, and this is estimated at $355m. (constant 2007 US $) over 1975–2007, or 5% of Mali's total multilateral aid receipts of $7.2bn. over the same period. Canadian imports of cotton from Mali peaked at Cdn.$20m. in 1999, but have ceased entirely since 2005; Canada had an overall trade balance with Mali of Cdn$22m. during the period from 1990 to 2008.

== History ==
Formal diplomatic ties between Mali and Canada were signaled by the openings of Mali's embassy in Ottawa in 1978, and Canada's embassy in Bamako in 1995. Mali has been a recipient of Canadian development aid since 1972, according to the Canadian embassy website. Statistics from the Organisation for Economic Co-operation and Development state that Canada has contributed official development assistance to Mali steadily since 1962, just three years after Mali's independence from France. Expressed in constant 2007 US dollars, Canada disbursed a net total of $936 million in bilateral aid between 1960 and 2007, making Canada responsible for 4.0% of Mali's total bilateral and multilateral aid receipts of $23.5 billion over this period, and ranking it as Mali's fifth-largest bilateral donor after France (16.5% of Mali's ODA), the Netherlands (9.4%), the United States (7.6%) and Germany (5.2%). Only US$7.1m. of Canadian aid was in the form of loans, all being made during the 1970s; Canada's loans to Mali represented 0.41% of the total of US$1.75bn. (2007$) made by all donors. Canada has also contributed aid to Mali via multilateral institutions, which collectively were responsible for 39.8% of Malian aid receipts since 1960; for the period from 1975 to 2007, Canada provided US$355m., or 4.9% of Mali's $7.2bn. in multilateral aid.

The Canadian International Development Agency supported two projects in Mali with Développement international Desjardins, the international development arm of the Quebec-based cooperative union, Desjardins Group. From 1997 to 2007, the Support Project for Urban Housing (Cdn.$5.0m.) sought to increase home ownership among low-income families in Bamako by guaranteeing mortgages that were financed by the Government of Mali and private players. In 2000, Canada's Auditor-General cited anomalies in the administration of this project, including failure to award the partner contract via a competitive process, bureaucratic delays leading to none of the scheduled 1,400 guarantees being issued during the first year, and failure of the Government of Mali to contribute its agreed-upon share. The Cdn.$7.3m. Nyèsigiso Network Support Project – Phase II (1998–2008) was aimed at poverty reduction through the provision of secure savings and credit services in the city of Ségou to clients including farmers and small entrepreneurs, 30% of whom were women.

Mark Nathanson, a Canadian-born businessman, has been credited with the discovery a major gold deposit at Sadiola in western Mali in 1988. This find led to the development of the Toronto-based company IAMGOLD Corporation (previously AGEM), and its joint venture with Malian, South African, and World Bank partners to establish the SEMOS (Société d'Exploitation des Mines d'Or de Sadiola S. A.) consortium. Sadiola and the nearby Yatela mine, under similar ownership, have been responsible for one-half of Mali's industrially mined gold production over the period 1996–2007.

While Canada-to-Mali extractive sector investment is concentrated in Toronto and Vancouver-based companies, firms headquartered in the Canadian province of Quebec command investments in most other sectors. However, the province of New Brunswick has enjoyed a unique and close relationship with Mali. In 2003, Mabo Touré, the daughter of the President of the Republic of Mali, Amadou Toumani Touré, completed a course of study at the University of Moncton; as of 2005, 35 students from Mali were enrolled at this institution. A three-year co-operation agreement signed in 2005 between the governments of Mali and New Brunswick was renewed for another five years in 2008, and in 2008, Malian President Touré was conferred an honorary doctorate degree by the Université de Moncton. The Collège communautaire du Nouveau-Brunswick received the distinction of "chevalier de l'Ordre national du Mali" in 2005, in recognition of its collaboration since 1991 with the Institut Universitaire de Gestion de Bamako, au Mali.

Canada and Mali have established at least two community twinning relationships. In a reversal of humanitarian flows, the citizens of the Malian village of Sanankoroba (situated 30 km south of Bamako) raised one hundred dollars as emergency relief to benefit their sister community of Sainte-Élisabeth, Quebec, which had been affected by the North American ice storm of 1998. The Sanankoroba – Ste-Élisabeth twinning was established in 1985 via contacts with Canada World Youth and SUCO (Solidarité Union Coopération) and continues in the areas of exchange visits and technical support. SUCO, which has been active in Mali since 1967, was contracted by CIDA in 1997–2001 and extended from 2002 to 2009 to execute similar development projects in sixty villages, as part of CIDA's long-standing theme of decentralization of Malian government services. In 1999, Roméo LeBlanc was the first Governor General of Canada to make a state visit to Mali, during which he toured Sanankoroba, in the company of the Malian President. In 2008, the Canadian city of Moncton, New Brunswick partnered with the Commune of Kaladougou in southwestern Mali, with the intent of a "knowledge sharing partnership regarding communications".

In 2004, Ralph Goodale, then Canada's minister of finance, met with parliamentarians and civil society groups in Mali, and in 2005, in concert with other nations in the G8 group, he agreed to cancel 100% of the debt of 18 heavily indebted low-income countries, including that of Mali. About $2 billion of Mali's foreign debt was written off, such that the total government debt declined from 49% of the Malian gross domestic product in 2005 to 20% in 2006. Annual external debt service payments fell from 3.1% of GDP in 1987 and 3.0% in 1997 to 1.3% in 2006.

== Development and technical assistance ==
Canada's involvement from 1977 to 1996 in Senegal's and Mali's rail transport sectors via CANAC Consultants Ltd. and CANARAIL was described in a 1999 review by the Canadian International Development Agency (CIDA) as aiming "to improve the effectiveness and efficiency of railway operations in Mali. Unfortunately, none of the projects fulfilled this mission, primarily due to external circumstances beyond their control[...]"; CIDA nevertheless concluded that "Canada has made a significant contribution to the survival of Mali's railways [and has] achieved significant outputs and notable social and economic effects"; the outputs included the supply of one hundred rail cars, nine locomotives and five ktonnes of rail track and parts, all fabricated in Canada, at an investment of Cdn.$38.8m. According to a United Nations 2006 investment guide for Mali, the Quebec consulting firm CanaRail was assigned a 30-year lease to modernise Mali's state railroad RCFM (Régie du Chemin de Fer du Mali), and Transrail SA, was ranked as Mali's third-largest planned foreign investment (CFA 19.7 bn, US$37 m.) during 2001–2005. In 2003, the former Canadian National Railway rail consultancy subsidiary Canac and France's Getma received a 25-year lease of the Senegalese-Malian railway, acquiring a 51% ownership of the Transrail public-private partnership, to which the governments of Senegal and Mali each retained 10% shares, private investors held 10% and the employees held 9%; the Transrail consortium received $132m. in loans from the World Bank International Development Association, the African Development Bank, and other lenders. Canac-Getma terminated or early-pensioned 632 employees and focused on freight instead of passenger operations. Canac was acquired in 2004 by the American firm Savage Companies, and Savage sold its Transrail shares to Belgium's Vecturis in 2007. CIDA's contribution to CANAC has come under criticism, including from the group Le Collectif Citoyen pour la Restitution et le Développement Intégré du Rail, which described the consequences of the rationalization process as "disastrous"; passenger traffic was reduced with the closure of 26 of 36 stations, to focus on the rapid export of cotton to the Dakar coast. Canadian Rick Antonson reported in a 2004 Mali travelogue that the Dakar-Bamako passenger train service was highly sporadic, operating less than once per week. In a 2007 review of its Mali programming, the World Bank noted that "the quality of [rail] service did not improve as anticipated. International goods traffic has remained stagnant; the lengths of track where trains can only move extremely slowly still total some 230 kilometers, compared to the target of 30 kilometers; the level of investments remains far too low. The concession is politically unpopular in Mali and there is a significant danger that unless outstanding issues can be quickly addressed—investment policies, continuation of passenger service—the privatization may be in danger". According to the Malian citizens' collective, Cocidirail, a Transrail audit revealed a deficit over 2003–2006 of $20m., and the Senegalese and Malian ministries of transport jointly declared in 2008 that Transrail had failed to run the railway more efficiently than the state-owned services. Ottawa-based transportation consulting firm CPCS Transcom also participated in the Mali-Senegal Railway privatization project, and was a member of the railway concessioning group that received a World Bank President's Award for Excellence in 1999.

In the telecommunications sector, during 1975–1994, CIDA supported the Programme panafricain de télécommunications (PANAFTEL) infrastructure project (Cdn.$170m.) in five West African countries including Mali, and Canadian private sector partners included Bell Canada International, CANAC, and SEGIBEL (a consortium of BCI and SEGITEL). Canada's International Development Research Centre has had at least eighty technical projects in Mali since 1971, including support for community telecentres in Bamako and Timbuktu between 1998 and 2009, to enhance public access to computers and the Internet.

Canada has been active in the development of Mali's energy infrastructure since the mid-1970s, with C$23m. invested up to 1999, according to CIDA. CIDA-funded projects in this sector included the Sélingué Dam Energy Transmission Line (1976–1980), the Bamako Electricity Sector Strengthening (1991–2000), and the Bamako-Ségou Very High Tension Connector Line project (1976–1980). The latter project's purpose was to bring hydroelectric power to the city of Ségou and environs via the construction of a 280-km. connector line and hydro poles from Bamako. At a cost of C$9.1m., CIDA concluded that "project has gone beyond achieving its purpose", by furnishing "Canadian materials [that] were judged to be adequate and very well suited to the climatic regions", through the training of four Malian managers, and by benefiting five Canadian firms, including Hydro-Québec International, through a total of C$7.7m. in supply contracts. Concerning a $6.3m. Malian hydroelectric project awarded in 1997 by CIDA, the Office of the Auditor-General of Canada identified "serious problems in the selection of the winning company", finding that CIDA "failed to show due diligence" in response to complaints from competing bidders, and that it failed to disqualify one bidder despite its lacking the minimum relevant experience. Laval, Quebec-based Transelec /Common inc was identified as the $6.3m. CIDA contract beneficiary, and it installed a 150 kV, 130 km line in Mali. For its construction of 500 km. of high-tension hydro lines in Mali that "will be able to significantly improve [Malians'] quality of life", the Quebec City engineering firm of Lambert Somec was awarded one of nine Canadian Awards for International Cooperation by the Minister of International Cooperation, the Honourable Susan Whelan in 2003; CANAC Incorporated was also among the award recipients that year.

During the 1980s and 1990s, CIDA supported the Organisation pour la mise en valeur du fleuve Sénégal (OMVS) (Senegal River development organization) and Manantali Dam projects in Mali for agricultural irrigation and hydroelectric power generation. Two Canadian public interest groups, the Halifax Initiative and Probe International cited CIDA documents which reported that CIDA had contributed at least Cdn.$76m. to Manantali-related projects, including, in addition to Hydro-Québec, supply contracts in 1993 to Dessau Associates and SNC-Shawinigan for consulting work, to Sulzer Canada in 1998 for turbines, and to Tecsult International for turbine installation. The Manantali Dam disrupted "ten centuries" of recession agriculture, in which farmers planted on the Senegal River floodplain after the rainy season, and this led to numerous problems, including reduced food production, "disease for humans and livestock, loss of recession agriculture, loss of pasturage for livestock, and loss of acacia forests – [which] had devastating human consequences. Additionally, the economic costs may not be outweighed by the benefits provided from the development of river resources[...]"; hydroelectric power was first delivered from Manantali to the Malian capital of Bamako in 2002.

== Development co-operation ==
The Canadian International Development Agency (CIDA) reported disbursing $326m. to Mali from 1996/97 to 2005/06 (nominal Canadian dollars), of which 26% was allocated to governance-related programming, followed by education (24%), health, population and fertility (17%), energy (7%), and agriculture (6%). In 2009, over thirty per cent of Canadian development support to Mali was targeted to education and 20% to health. The precise fractions of Canada-to-Mali aid stipulated for the procurement of Canadian goods and services have not been reported.

Canada's overall proportion of tied aid has declined steadily since the 1950s and 1960s, when it exceeded 80%; in the early 1990s, CIDA internal analysis found that 68–69% of disbursements for sub-Saharan Africa went to Canadian-sourced purchases, well above the 50% lower bound established at that time. In conformance with a Paris Declaration on Aid Effectiveness target, Canada's Minister of International Cooperation announced in 2008 that by fiscal year 2012–2013, the Government of Canada will entirely untie its international development aid. Over the 1962–2007 period, given that Canada-Mali aid was tied at 80% until 1990, at 70% from 1991 to 2000, and at the declining rates reported to OECD in the following table, it can be estimated that of the total US$936m. (2007 dollars) provided, approximately 66%, or $616m., has re-entered the Canadian economy through Mali's purchases of products and services from Canadian businesses and non-profit organizations, chiefly in technical consulting, telecommunications, hydroelectricity, and railways. Canada's contribution represented 7% of Mali's total country-to-country aid receipts of $14.0 bn. over this period, ranking it fifth-largest donor country. More than 99% of Canada-to-Mali aid disbursements have been in the form of grants, with concessional loans comprising $7.1m. (0.8%).

Canadian-based non-governmental organizations have been carrying out development projects in Mali since the 1960s. The umbrella group Canadian Council for International Co-operation lists 18 Canadian NGOs in Mali. CIDA's partnerships with not-for-profits also include the Quebec City-based Groupe Consultations CCISD (Center for International Cooperation in Health and Development) and Ste-Foy, Québec's MIR Partenariats et développement international (2005–2010, $7.3m., Paramedic Training Support). The Canadian Broadcasting Corporation has profiled a journalists' training project sponsored by Farm Radio in southern Mali. In addition to donations and other private fundraising revenues, from fiscal years 1998–99 to 2006–07, these not-for-profit development NGOs collectively benefitted from CIDA grants of between Cdn$0.34m. and $7.23m. per year, an annual average of 8.4% of Canada's total aid package to Mali. Through its Seeds of Survival program, USC Canada reports that it has been collaborating with communities in Mali since 1989, promoting seed banks and increased crop diversity through drought-resistant varieties. Between 2003 and 2009, Save the Children Canada received a Cdn.$5m. grant from CIDA in support of their work against the trafficking of children from Mali and Burkina Faso who are sent to Côte d'Ivoire as agricultural labourers.

== Trade and investment ==
Canada averaged Mali's 19th-most important import partner during the period of 1983 to 2004, but fell out of the top 25 during 2005–2007, and has not figured among Mali's top 25 export recipients with the exception of years 1987–1989, when Canada ranked between 7th and 22nd. Canadian mining investment in Mali in 2021 was estimated by the Canadian government at nearly Cdn.$1.5 bn. and grew from four Canadian-owned mining properties in Mali in 1991 to 73 in 2005. From 1996 to 2007, approximately US$267m., or 3% of Mali's total revenue from industrial gold production, went to the Canadian company IAMGOLD Corporation and its investors, including both of Canada's public pension funds. The two mines part-owned by IAMGOLD yielded half of Mali's gold output over this period. According to IAMGOLD's South African co-partner in these mines, AngloGold Ashanti, 40% of earnings went into the Malian economy through various government revenues, workers' salaries, Malian sub-contractors and local community development initiatives. As Mali's gold mines were estimated to contribute 8% of the gross domestic product in 2007, IAMGOLD's mines comprised about 3–4% of Mali's economy. Sixty percent of these mines' revenue went to foreign stakeholders, including IAMGOLD, AngloGold Ashanti and its sub-contractors, the World Bank's International Finance Corporation, and European creditors.

=== Commodities ===
Canada's exports to Mali ranked it Mali's 16th-most important trading partner in 1997, declining to 21st in 2004, and below 25th during 2005–2007; Canada's imports from Mali have not ranked it among Mali's top 25 partners except for the years 1987–1989. Over the period 1990–2008, Canada's product exports to Mali, $112m. (current US$) comprised 0.5% of Canada's total exports to Africa, while exports to all Africa countries, $22.0bn., were 0.5% of total Canadian exports; Canadian imports from Mali were 0.4% of Africa-to-Canada total, and African imports were 1.1% of the global-to-Canada total. Most Canadian exports to Mali enter duty-free, as the Government of Mali's Mining Code permits foreign mining companies to "pay no corporate tax for the first five years and import equipment duty-free throughout exploration and for three years of exploitation. After five years, there is a 35% tax, but that is reduced when profits are reinvested in Mali". During 2003–2008, the Canadian Bank Note Company exported an average of Cdn$1m. per year in "fiscal stamps" to Mali, used as tax registration decals for display on all Malian road vehicles; mineral exploration equipment and tax decals also dominate Canada's exports with neighbouring country Burkina Faso. Public disclosure documents from CIDA record contracts under the "Common Development Funds" project for the Canadian Bank Note Company of $1,059,966 (20 December 2006), 73% disbursed, and $1,060,266 (2 January 2007), 0% disbursed. An average of US$0.3 million annually between 2001 and 2007 was shipped from Canada to Mali in previously worn articles of clothing. In both 2007 and 2008, through CIDA's Canada Fund for Local Initiatives, oral contraceptives valued at $0.2 m. were supplied to women in Mali's Dogon region. Canada has gone from importing, at its peak in 1999, 6.7% of Mali's total raw cotton exports (US$14m. out $210m.), to 0% from 2005 onward. Canada's global imports of raw cotton have also fallen by over 90%, from US$76m. in 1999 to $7m. in 2008, and in the latter year, 98.5% of it was imported from the United States. Mali was the seventh-largest cotton-exporting nation in 1999, and it has fallen from seventh to tenth position from 2003 to 2007. In their 2005/06 study tour of seven African nations to assess Canada's foreign policy record on that continent, Canadian Senators Hugh Segal and Peter A. Stollery "heard in Mali that there was little will on the part of certain developed countries to make a trade deal on cotton. Standing in a cotton field in that country, Malian farmers passionately described the U.S. actions [of domestic protectionism] as 'sabotage' in that they were causing an increase in poverty instead of the desired poverty reduction that the U.S. government has been publicly calling for"; the Canadian senators concluded that "[i]n Mali, the greatest demand that was made of us was not more aid, but rather a fair world trading system where cotton farmers could export their competitive products".

	US Dollars, mill., current			
	Exports from Canada to Mali	Imports to Canada from Mali		Trade balance (Canadian exports minus imports)
	Exports from Canada to Mali	Total	of which raw cotton (HS 5201)	Trade balance (Canadian exports minus imports)
1990	$3.994	$11.444	$10.937	-$7.450
1991	$2.593	$6.972	$6.861	-$4.379
1992	$6.315	$4.907	$4.726	$1.408
1993	$4.661	$1.882	$1.435	$2.779
1994	$2.493	$2.043	$1.465	$0.450
1995	$7.170	$5.970	$5.048	$1.200
1996	$8.766	$2.152	$1.198	$6.614
1997	$8.772	$9.915	$9.460	-$1.143
1998	$6.369	$13.142	$11.365	-$6.773
1999	$7.521	$19.123	$13.973	-$11.602
2000	$5.433	$6.274	$5.559	-$0.841
2001	$2.716	$2.084	$1.628	$0.632
2002	$2.065	$1.990	$1.306	$0.075
2003	$3.810	$0.781	$0.228	$3.030
2004	$6.841	$0.315	$0.000	$6.526
2005	$5.745	$0.179	$0.000	$5.566
2006	$9.533	$0.353	$0.000	$9.180
2007	$7.278	$0.424	$0.000	$6.854
2008	$9.856	$0.375	$0.000	$9.481
Total 1990–2008	$111.931	$90.325	$75.190	$21.607

Canadian international commodity trade patterns since 1990 can be characterized by aggregating product import and export volumes for the top 25 harmonized system codes for individual years in the Trade Data Online search interface to Statistics Canada data provided by Industry Canada. Compared to the previous decade, the profile of Canadian exports to Mali has altered in the 2000s, with mining equipment and printed matter more than doubling their combined shares, from 17% during 1990–1999 to 37% from 2000 to 2008. Printed matter comprises essentially tax decals and passports supplied to the Malian government via the Canadian Bank Note Company. Hydroelectric energy-related exports (hydro poles, hydraulic turbines) were limited to the years 1997–2001. Because some product codes, particularly mechanical and electrical devices, are generic in nature and potentially employed by several sectors including mining, railways, or telecommunications, the aggregates in the following table are underreported to some extent.

Canadian commodity exports to Mali
	1990–1999		2000–2008	
Commodity	Total(current US $)	% of total exports	Total(current US $)	% of total exports
Worn clothing	$687,146	1.2%	$2,097,724	3.9%
Printed matter	$1,155,340	2.0%	$7,289,360	13.7%
Drugs/Vaccines/Contraceptives	$2,419,064	4.1%	$1,339,042	2.5%
Food	$11,259,572	19.2%	$4,060,932	7.6%
Mining equipment	$8,832,176	15.1%	$12,549,639	23.6%
Railway equipment	$2,665,595	4.5%	$1,217,682	2.3%
Telecommunications equipment	$11,163,086	19.0%	$4,518,652	8.5%
Hydroelectric energy	$3,392,191	5.8%	$1,113,809	2.1%
Engines, vehicles, petroleum	$912,698	1.6%	$1,098,683	2.1%
Polyethylene, other polymers	$229,968	0.4%	$1,572,801	3.0%
Subtotal	$42,716,836	72.8%	$36,858,324	69.2%
Total (all exports)	$58,655,059	100.0%	$53,276,605	100.0%

=== Services ===
For its development projects in Mali between 2000 and 2007, the World Bank awarded technical consultancy and infrastructure contracts totalling U$12.7m. to a number of Canadian businesses, The Government of Canada contributed a total of US$31.8m. to international financial institutions and regional development banks in support of programming in Mali from FY1999-2000 to FY 2006–2007.

CIDA's Mali-related contracts involving Canadian business partnerships have included CRC Sogema (tax and educational reform, five contracts valued at Cdn.$72.6m, 1997–2009), SNC Lavalin (agricultural development, tax reform, two contracts, $34m., 1997–2015), Geomar Inc. and Fédération des Agriculteurs et Agricultrices Francophones du Nouveau-Brunswick (joint with SNC Lavalin). Since 1986, Quebec-based CRC Sogema has, through African Development Bank, CIDA and World Bank funding, been involved in numerous projects including the reform of Mali's taxation system, the decentralisation of educational services, and banking reform. In 2006 at the Canadian International Trade Tribunal, a contract awarded by CIDA to the latter three organisations was contested on the grounds of unfair treatment by the Centre canadien d'étude et de coopération internationale, the Société de coopération pour le développement international and L'Union des producteurs agricoles—Développement international, who were competing bidders in partnership with Tecsult Inc.; the Tribunal dismissed the case, citing a lack of jurisdictional authority. CIDA's Mali contracts also include the Canadian firms Edinova Editeur Conseil (textbook support), Rail & Traction Canada Inc. (support to Common Funds Development), Services Techniques DHG Ltée (support to Common Funds Development), and Tecsult Eduplus Inc. (continuing education for teachers).

== Investment ==
=== Non-extractive sectors ===
In 2005, the Quebec-based firm Seaquest-Infotel signed a CFA 2.9 bn. (US$5.3m.) contract with Mali's national telephone service, SOTELMA, to provide a fibre-optic network for the city of Bamako. The contract was reportedly ended unilaterally by SOTELMA in 2007. Canadian shipments of telecommunications-related products to Mali totalled US$4.5m. between 2000 and 2006; this includes $1.7m in optical fibre cables (harmonized system HS code 900110) shipped in 2006, however in 2007 and 2008, no exports were reported in this sector.

According to a United Nations Conference on Trade and Development (UNCTAD) survey in 2006 of foreign investment in Mali, Canadian firms active there included Segibel/SOTELMA (telecommunications), two Internet service providers, Afribone and Experco International, and a water drilling firm, Hydro Sahel. Canada has been exporting an average of U$185k annually in railway equipment into Mali over the period 2004–2008. Since 1998, the Canadian Bank Note Company has been doing business with the Government of Mali, providing printed sales tax stickers, holographic motor vehicle tax decals, and passports and passport printing equipment. In 2007, the Canadian Bank Note Company's passport-printing contract with Mali was renewed for five years.

=== Canada Pension Plan ===
The Canada Pension Plan is the Canadian government's public retirement pension fund for all Canadian citizens who have worked in Canada, with the exception of citizens of the province of Quebec. The fund is managed by the CPP Investment Board, and over 2006–2011, four Canadian and two foreign-based firms active wholly or in part in Mali have received investments from the fund, totalling $110m. in 2011. Not included in the following table is SNC Lavalin, a Montreal-based international civil engineering firm which has carried out several CIDA and World Bank-sponsored projects in Mali; the CPP had invested an average of $78m. in this company's shares over 2006–2008.

=== Mining ===
The Government of Mali reported that mining surpassed cotton in its contribution to the national economy in 1997, and it has remained Mali's chief export earner.

Despite intense gold exploration activity in Mali over the past two decades by Canada and other countries, no large gold deposits on the scale of Sadiola or Morila (both scheduled for closure in 2013) have yet to materialize. The Fraser Institute survey also deemed Mali the seventh-most favourable location out of 71 with respect to its environmental policy: 80% of miners surveyed considered these regulations as either encouraging or not a deterrent to investment.

Ten of the "at least 19" foreign mining companies reported by the United States Geological Survey as active in Mali in 2006 were incorporated in Canada.

==== Gold produced by Canadian-Malian-South African SEMOS consortium ====
IAMGOLD (formerly AGEM and International African Mining Gold Corporation) has been active in Mali since the late 1980s, and partnered in 1992 with South Africa's AngloGold Limited (reincorporated as AngloGold Ashanti in 2004). The Government of Mali issued their joint venture, incorporated as SEMOS, a mining exploitation permit in 1994 to undertake gold exploration in the Sadiola area of western Mali's Kayes Region. Financing, totaling U$250m., was obtained from the International Finance Corporation of the World Bank ($160m.), the European Investment Bank, Germany Investment and Development Company (DEG), Netherlands Development Finance Company (FMO), Proparco (France) and others. Commercial exploitation of the Sadiola gold mine began in 1996, with the nearby Yatéla mine opening in 2001. The two mines are collectively owned under the consortium (38% and 40% shares, respectively, to each of IAMGOLD and AngloAmerican Ashanti), with smaller shares held by the Government of Mali (18% and 20% respectively) and the World Bank's International Finance Corporation (6% for Sadiola only). The terms of IAMGOLD's and AngloGold Ashanti's joint venture stipulate that the day-to-day operations are the administrative responsibility of AngloGold Ashanti, and AngloGold Ashanti collects an additional 1% of Sadiola's revenue for this service. In August 2009, IAMGOLD announced that it had entered an option agreement permitting it to acquire a 51% ownership of Channel Islands-registered Avnel Gold Mining Ltd.

==== Sadiola and Yatéla gold mine profits reported by IAMGOLD Corp. and AngloGold Ashanti ====
While IAMGOLD and AngloGold hold equal 38% and 40% shares in the Sadiola and Yatela mines, respectively, the net earnings reported in their individual annual reports differ. AngloGold Ashanti, while not reporting these mines' earnings separately during five of the years between 1996 and 2008, reports for the remaining years total earnings of $248m., while IAMGOLD reports $308m. for all 13 years. The most recent five years during which both companies reported earnings show a discrepancy of 13% (AngloGold: $172m.; IAMGOLD: $198m.), with IAMGOLD reporting $26m. more, despite IAMGOLD reporting that AngloGold Ashanti received an additional 1% of earnings in return for management of the mines.

==== Socio-economic and environmental impact studies ====
At least eight independent groups have published studies of the broader impacts of the Canadian-Malian-South African joint-owned Sadiola and Yatela mines, namely, Canada's North/South Institute (2000), France's Les Amis De La Terre (Friends of the Earth) (2003), Norway's Chr. Michelsen Institute (2006) on behalf of the World Bank, Oxfam America (2006), France's International Federation of Human Rights, the United Nations Global Compact, and two research groups at the University of Quebec at Montreal including the Groupe de recherche sur les activités minières en Afrique (GRAMA). The two major and recurrent findings in these studies were (1) the public inaccessibility of information on the allocation of Sadiola and Yatela gold revenues, either from the companies or from the Government of Mali, and (2) the Government of Mali's inadequate capacity to manage health and environmental aspects of these mines.

== Immigration ==
The 2006 Census of Canada estimated that there were 855 persons originally from Mali living in Canada, 390 having arrived since 2001.

== High level visits ==
President Amadou Toumani Touré and a delegation of Malian officials paid a state visit to Canada in May 2005, including events in Ottawa and in New Brunswick. Touré also visited Quebec City in October 2008 for the annual Francophonie Summit.

The Governor General of Canada, Michaëlle Jean included Mali in her 2006 state visit to five African nations, and she was only the second head of state after Nelson Mandela to address the National Assembly of Mali.

Lawrence Cannon, Canada's Minister of Foreign Affairs, met in Mali, in August 2009, with President Amadou Toumani Touré to discuss bilateral and regional relations, and also visited the Canadian-government-supported École de maintien de la paix Alioune Blondin Beye (EMP).

== The current state of relations ==
In 2008, Canada's Department of Foreign Affairs provided a $600,000 grant to L'École de Maintien de la Paix Alioune Blondin Beye (EMP), a training school for 800 African peacekeepers in Bamako. Since 2006, instructors from Canada's Department of National Defence and the Pearson Peacekeeping Centre have provided training there, in concert with Mali, France and other European partners.

Virginie Saint-Louis was appointed the Canadian Ambassador to Mali in January 2009. One of her first official functions was to attend an annual stakeholders' workshop sponsored by the Canadian/Malian/South African SEMOS gold mining consortium in Sadiola.

Malian-Canadians residing in the Canadian capital region have established a group whose mission includes the promotion of Canadian investment in Mali. The Government of Mali's Ministry of Housing, Land Affairs and Planning, in concert with several Malian banks, held its first "Salon de l'Habitat du Mali" international exhibition in Montreal in May 2009, in order to encourage expatriate Malians to acquire land and homes back in Mali, as well as encourage foreign investment in their country by the diaspora.

In April 2009, the intervention of Malian president Amadou Toumani Touré was instrumental in the release of two Canadian diplomats, Robert Fowler and Louis Guay, who had been taken as hostages in the Republic of Niger during December 2008. In an official communiqué, the Government of Mali quoted the Canadian Ambassador, Mrs. Saint-Louis, as thanking President Touré for showing once again, that he supports Canada, and President Touré responded that his country spared no effort to free the two Canadian diplomats on behalf of the cooperation and friendship between Canada and Mali.

Mali in 2010 was the site of one of three international and five Canadian consultative meetings during the first year of the Canadian government's Office of the Extractive Sector Corporate Social Responsibility Counsellor activities, with discussions held with members of civil society, the private sector, and embassy officials.

During the Tuareg rebellion of 2012, Canada declared its position in response to the Unilateral Declaration of independence of Azawad saying that "We are absolutely not recognizing this declaration".

Starting in early 2012 several insurgent groups in Mali started to take over the country. In January 2013 Mali asked for assistance from France to aid in ridding the country of the rebel insurgents. In December the UN authorized an African intervention with the approval of the Economic Community of West African States. France then proceeded to ask its NATO allies to get involved, with Canada joining the effort by helping with the transportation of troops with a C-17 Globemaster. This was followed by twenty four Joint Task Force 2 members who entered the country to secure the Canadian embassy in the capital Bamako.

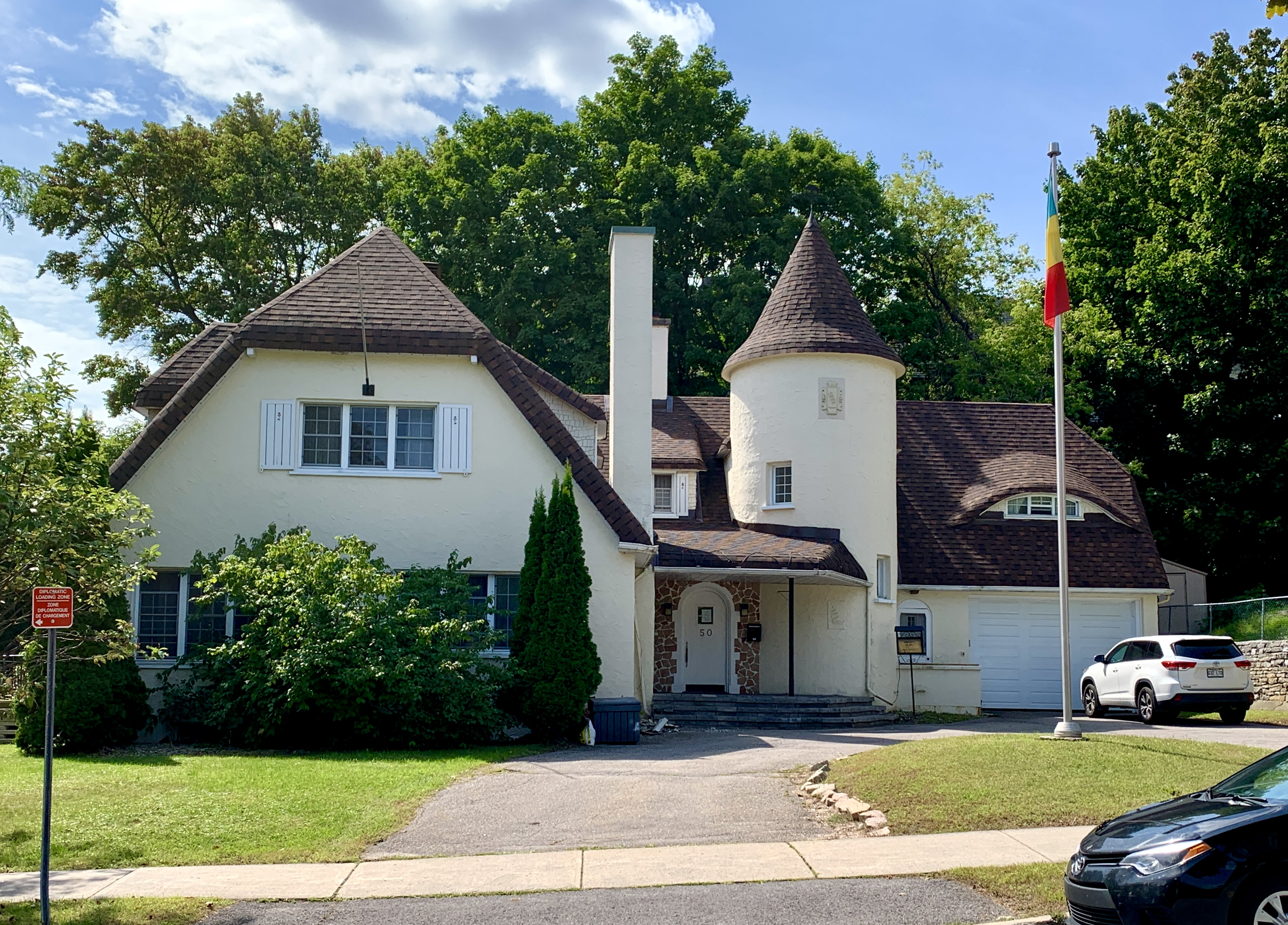
Embassy of Mali in Ottawa

== Resident diplomatic missions ==
- Canada has an embassy in Bamako.
- Mali has an embassy in Ottawa.

== See also ==
- Foreign relations of Canada
- Foreign relations of Mali
