= Economy of Mali =

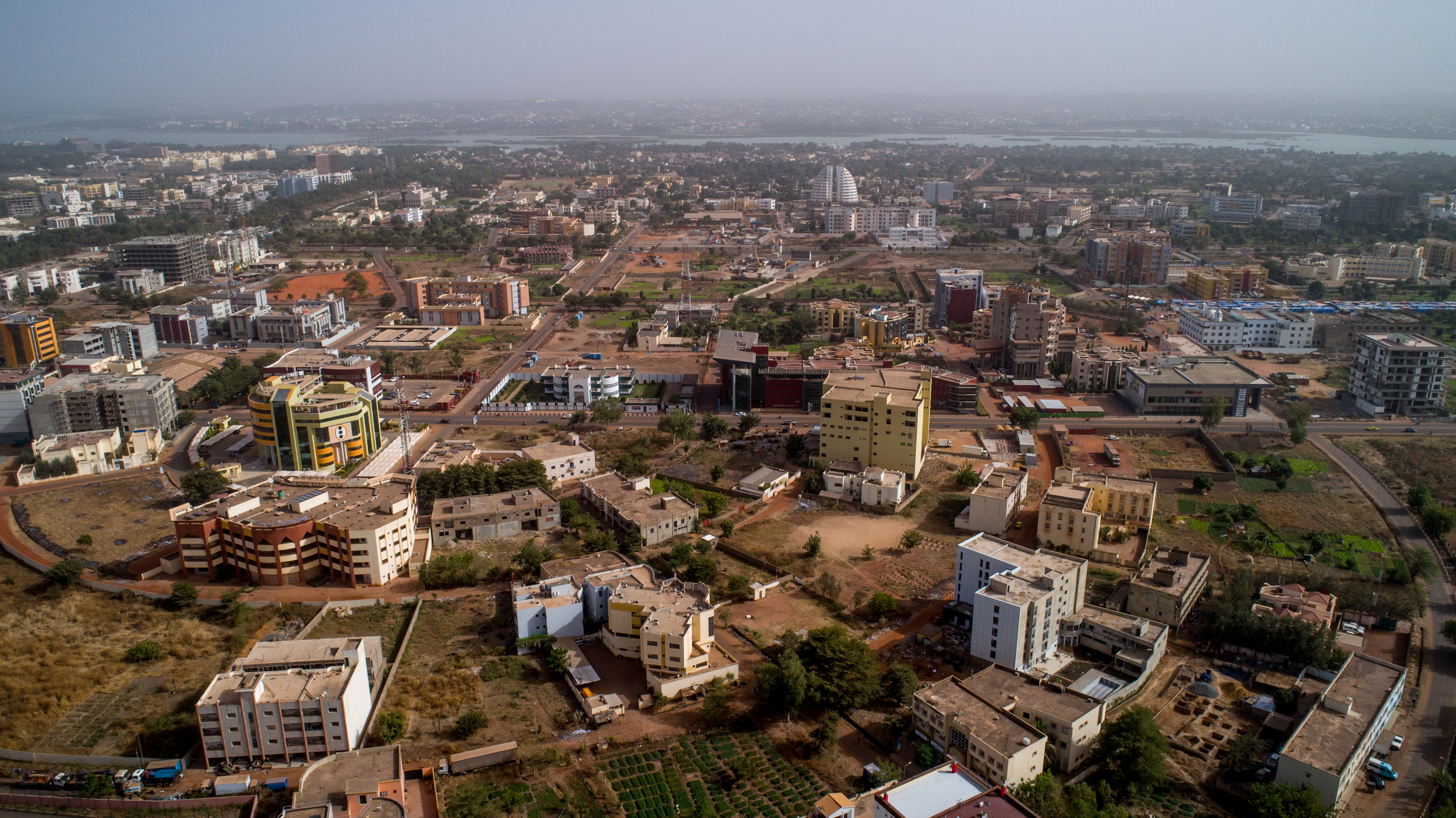
- Bamako, the capital of Mali
- Trade organisations: AU, AfCFTA, WTO, ECOWAS, CEN-SAD
- Country group: Least Developed; Low-income economy

Statistics
- GDP: ▲$23.21 billion (nominal; 2025); ▲$72.74 billion (PPP; 2025)
- GDP rank: 121st (nominal; 2025); 115th (PPP; 2025)
- GDP growth: 4.9% (2025)
- GDP per capita: ▲$936 (nominal; 2025); ▲$2,930 (PPP; 2025)
- GDP per capita rank: 175th (nominal; 2025); 173rd (PPP; 2025)
- GDP per capita growth: 1.9% (2024)
- Inflation (CPI): 1.734% (2018)
- Gini coefficient: 35.7 medium (2021)
- Human Development Index: ▲0.419 low (2023) (188th); 0.282 IHDI (2017)

External
- Current account: ▲ −$886 million (2017 est.)
- Gross external debt: ▲$4.192 billion (31 December 2017 est.)

Public finance
- Government debt: ▼35.4% of GDP (2017 est.)
- Foreign reserves: ▲$647.8 million (31 December 2017 est.)
- Budget balance: −2.9% (of GDP) (2017 est.)
- Revenue: 3.075 billion (2017 est.)
- Spending: 3.513 billion (2017 est.)
- All values, unless otherwise stated, are in US dollars.

Mali has a developing economy. It is based to a large extent upon agriculture, with a mostly rural population engaged in subsistence agriculture. It is among the ten poorest nations of the world and is one of the 39 Heavily Indebted Poor Countries. Mali is a major recipient of foreign aid from many sources, including multilateral organizations (most significantly the World Bank, the African Development Bank, and Arab Funds), and bilateral programs funded by the European Union, France, the United States, Canada, the Netherlands, and Germany. Before 1991, the former Soviet Union, China and the Warsaw Pact countries had been a major source of economic and military aid.

The per capita gross domestic product (GDP) of Mali was $820 in 1999. Mali's great potential wealth lies in mining and the production of agricultural commodities, livestock, and fish. The most productive agricultural area lies along the banks of the Niger River, the Inner Niger Delta and the southwestern region around Sikasso. Mali advocates for a traditional economic system.

== Overview ==
GDP per capita development of Mali

Between 1992 and 1995, Mali implemented an economic adjustment program that resulted in economic growth and a reduction in financial imbalances. This was reflected in the increased GDP growth rates (9.6% in 2002) and decreased inflation. GDP in 2002 amounted to US$3.2 billion, made up of agriculture 37.8%, industry 26.4% and services 35.9%.

Effective implementation of macroeconomic stabilization and economic liberalization policies and the stable political situation resulted in good economic performance and enabled Mali to strengthen the foundations for a market-oriented economy and encourage private sector development, backed up by significant progress in implementing the country's privatization program. Agricultural reform measures were aimed at diversifying and expanding production as well as at reducing costs.

Mali's economic performance is fragile, characterized by a vulnerability to climatic conditions, fluctuating terms of trade, dependence on ports in neighboring countries.

Mali produces cotton, cereals and rice. Although locally produced rice now provides competition to imported Asian rice, Mali's primary export is cotton. Livestock exports and industry (producing vegetable and cottonseed oils, and textiles) have experienced growth. Although most of Mali is desert or semi-desert, the Niger River is a potential irrigation source. Exports are in three primary sector products (56% gold, 27% cotton, 5% livestock). Ivory Coast is where most of the country's trade goes through and the crisis previously experienced here had a negative effect on Mali's economy.

The mining industry in Mali has recently attracted renewed interest and investment from foreign companies. Gold and phosphate are the only minerals mined in Mali although deposits of copper and diamonds do also exist. The emergence of gold as Mali's leading export product since 1999 has helped mitigate some of the negative impact of the cotton and Ivory Coast crises.

The development of the oil industry is important due to the country's dependence on the importation of all petroleum products from neighbouring states. Electricity is provided by the parastatal utility, Electricité du Mali.

== Macro-economic trend ==
The following table shows the main economic indicators in 1980–2026. Inflation below 5% is in green. Figures for 2025 are IMF estimates; figures for 2026 are IMF projections.

| Year | GDP (in bn. US$ PPP) | GDP per capita (in US$ PPP) | GDP (in bn. US$ nominal) | GDP growth (real) | Inflation rate (in Percent) | Government debt (in % of GDP) |
|---|---|---|---|---|---|---|
| 1980 | 6.1 | 813 | 2.7 | ▲3.3% | ▲20.3% | n/a |
| 1981 | ▲6.6 | ▲864 | ▼2.2 | ▼-0.9% | ▲12.7% | n/a |
| 1982 | ▲6.8 | ▲868 | ▼1.7 | ▼-3.3% | ▲3.9% | n/a |
| 1983 | ▲7.1 | ▲885 | ▼1.5 | ▲0.3% | ▲10.5% | n/a |
| 1984 | ▼7.1 | ▼862 | ▼1.4 | ▼-3.9% | ▲10.7% | n/a |
| 1985 | ▲8.0 | ▲955 | ▲1.6 | ▲9.6% | ▲9.1% | n/a |
| 1986 | ▲8.1 | ▼947 | ▲2.1 | ▼-1.0% | ▼-1.4% | n/a |
| 1987 | ▲8.3 | ▲952 | ▲2.4 | ▼-0.2% | ▼-14.9% | n/a |
| 1988 | ▲9.2 | ▲1,046 | ▲2.7 | ▲8.1% | ▲8.9% | n/a |
| 1989 | ▲9.9 | ▲1,099 | ▲3.3 | ▲3.0% | ▼-0.2% | n/a |
| 1990 | ▼9.8 | ▼1,066 | ▼3.2 | ▼-4.6% | ▲1.6% | n/a |
| 1991 | ▲11.3 | ▲1,208 | ▲3.6 | ▲11.7% | ▲1.5% | n/a |
| 1992 | ▼10.9 | ▼1,142 | ▲3.7 | ▼-5.6% | ▼-5.9% | n/a |
| 1993 | ▲11.8 | ▲1,207 | ▼3.6 | ▲5.4% | ▼-0.6% | n/a |
| 1994 | ▲12.3 | ▲1,233 | ▼2.7 | ▲2.2% | ▲24.3% | n/a |
| 1995 | ▲12.7 | ▲1,252 | ▲3.3 | ▲1.6% | ▲11.6% | n/a |
| 1996 | ▲13.8 | ▲1,328 | ▲3.7 | ▲6.4% | ▲6.5% | n/a |
| 1997 | ▲15.0 | ▲1,405 | ▼3.4 | ▲6.4% | ▼-0.7% | n/a |
| 1998 | ▲16.0 | ▲1,461 | ▲3.9 | ▲5.5% | ▲4.1% | n/a |
| 1999 | ▲16.6 | ▲1,476 | ▲4.1 | ▲2.4% | ▼-1.2% | n/a |
| 2000 | ▲16.7 | ▼1,442 | ▼3.5 | ▼-1.6% | ▼-0.8% | 77.0% |
| 2001 | ▲19.1 | ▲1,601 | ▲4.1 | ▲11.8% | ▲5.2% | ▼66.3% |
| 2002 | ▲20.8 | ▲1,693 | ▲4.6 | ▲7.4% | ▲5.0% | ▼36.0% |
| 2003 | ▲22.3 | ▲1,759 | ▲5.5 | ▲5.2% | ▼-1.3% | ▲37.7% |
| 2004 | ▼22.3 | ▼1,700 | ▲6.4 | ▼-2.8% | ▼-3.1% | ▼36.1% |
| 2005 | ▲24.6 | ▲1,814 | ▲7.4 | ▲6.9% | ▲6.4% | ▲39.5% |
| 2006 | ▲26.6 | ▲1,900 | ▲8.1 | ▲5.0% | ▲1.6% | ▼15.4% |
| 2007 | ▲28.4 | ▲1,966 | ▲9.7 | ▲4.1% | ▲1.4% | ▲15.6% |
| 2008 | ▲30.3 | ▲2,031 | ▲11.5 | ▲4.8% | ▲9.2% | ▲17.3% |
| 2009 | ▲32.0 | ▲2,075 | ▲11.9 | ▲4.9% | ▲2.4% | ▲18.8% |
| 2010 | ▲34.3 | ▲2,153 | ▲12.4 | ▲5.9% | ▲1.2% | ▲21.8% |
| 2011 | ▲36.4 | ▲2,209 | ▲15.5 | ▲3.8% | ▲3.0% | ▼20.1% |
| 2012 | ▲36.9 | ▼2,178 | ▼14.8 | ▼-0.3% | ▲5.3% | ▲21.3% |
| 2013 | ▲38.8 | ▲2,222 | ▲15.8 | ▲3.3% | ▼-0.6% | ▲22.2% |
| 2014 | ▲42.0 | ▲2,333 | ▲17.1 | ▲6.5% | ▲0.9% | ▲22.6% |
| 2015 | ▲45.1 | ▲2,424 | ▼15.6 | ▲6.2% | ▲1.4% | ▲25.8% |
| 2016 | ▲48.2 | ▲2,513 | ▲16.8 | ▲6.0% | ▼-1.8% | ▲30.1% |
| 2017 | ▲51.7 | ▲2,611 | ▲18.3 | ▲5.4% | ▲2.4% | 30.1% |
| 2018 | ▲55.0 | ▲2,690 | ▲20.4 | ▲4.9% | ▲1.9% | ▲31.4% |
| 2019 | ▲59.5 | ▲2,826 | ▲20.5 | ▲5.0% | ▼-3.0% | ▲34.3% |
| 2020 | ▼59.3 | ▼2,730 | ▲20.8 | ▼-1.2% | ▲0.5% | ▲39.8% |
| 2021 | ▲62.7 | ▲2,802 | ▲23.1 | ▲3.1% | ▲3.8% | ▲43.2% |
| 2022 | ▲69.7 | ▲3,021 | ▼22.7 | ▲3.7% | ▲9.7% | ▼42.9% |
| 2023 | ▲75.7 | ▲3,184 | ▲24.8 | ▲4.7% | ▲2.1% | ▲44.3% |
| 2024 | ▲81.5 | ▲3,325 | ▲26.8 | ▲5.0% | ▲3.2% | ▼44.0% |
| 2025 | ▲87.9 | ▲3,480 | ▲30.1 | ▲4.9% | ▲2.3% | ▼41.9% |
| 2026 | ▲95.4 | ▲3,665 | ▲33.8 | ▲5.5% | ▲2.2% | ▼40.8% |

== Agriculture ==
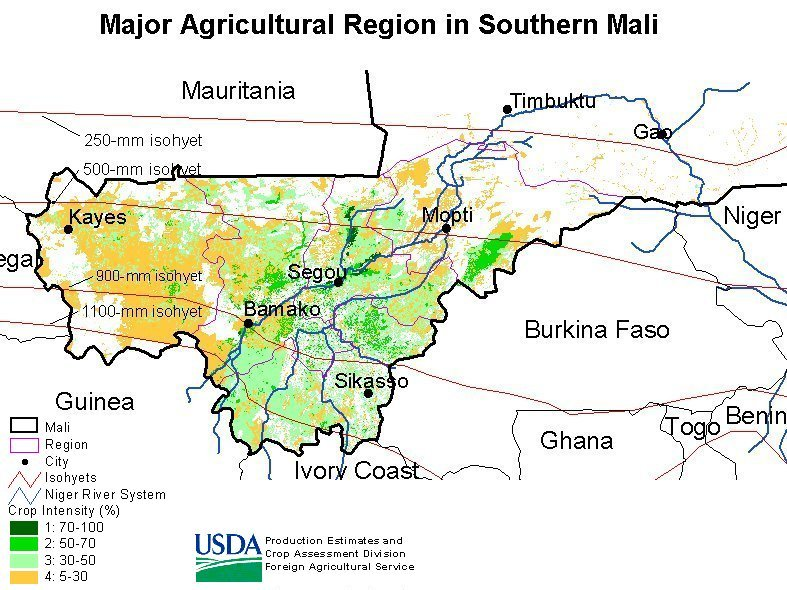
The major agricultural region in southern Mali, showing isohyet lines and crop intensity percentages. Mali's most productive agricultural region is located between Bamako and Mopti. Irrigation water is used mainly for rice while cotton is grown as a rainfed crop. (USDA: 2001)

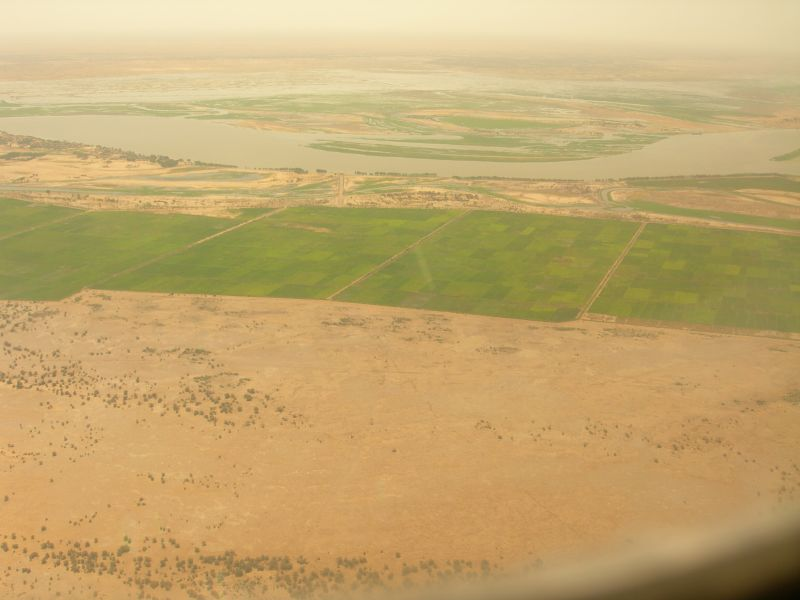
The Inner Niger Delta and surrounding farmlands, Mali.

In 2018, Mali produced:

- 3.8 million tons of maize;
- 3.1 million tons of rice;
- 1.8 million tons of millet;
- 1.5 million tons of sorghum;
- 814 thousand tons of mango (15th largest producer in the world);
- 710 thousand tons of cotton (15th largest producer in the world);
- 551 thousand tons of watermelon;
- 522 thousand tons of onion;
- 512 thousand tons of okra;
- 370 thousand tons of sugar cane;
- 368 thousand tons of peanuts;
- 312 thousand tons of sweet potato;
- 303 thousand tons of potato;
- 226 thousand tons of sheanut;
- 215 thousand tons of cowpea;
- 196 thousand tons of banana;
- 167 thousand tons of cashew nuts (8th largest producer in the world);
- 159 thousand tons of beans;
- 159 thousand tons of tomato;

In addition to smaller productions of other agricultural products.

Agricultural activities occupy 80% of Mali's labor force and provide 42% of the GDP. Cotton and livestock make up 75%–80% of Mali's annual exports. Small-scale traditional farming dominates the agricultural sector, with subsistence farming (of cereals, primarily sorghum, pearl millet, and maize) on about 90% of the 14,000 square kilometres (1,400,000 ha; 3,500,000 acres) under cultivation.

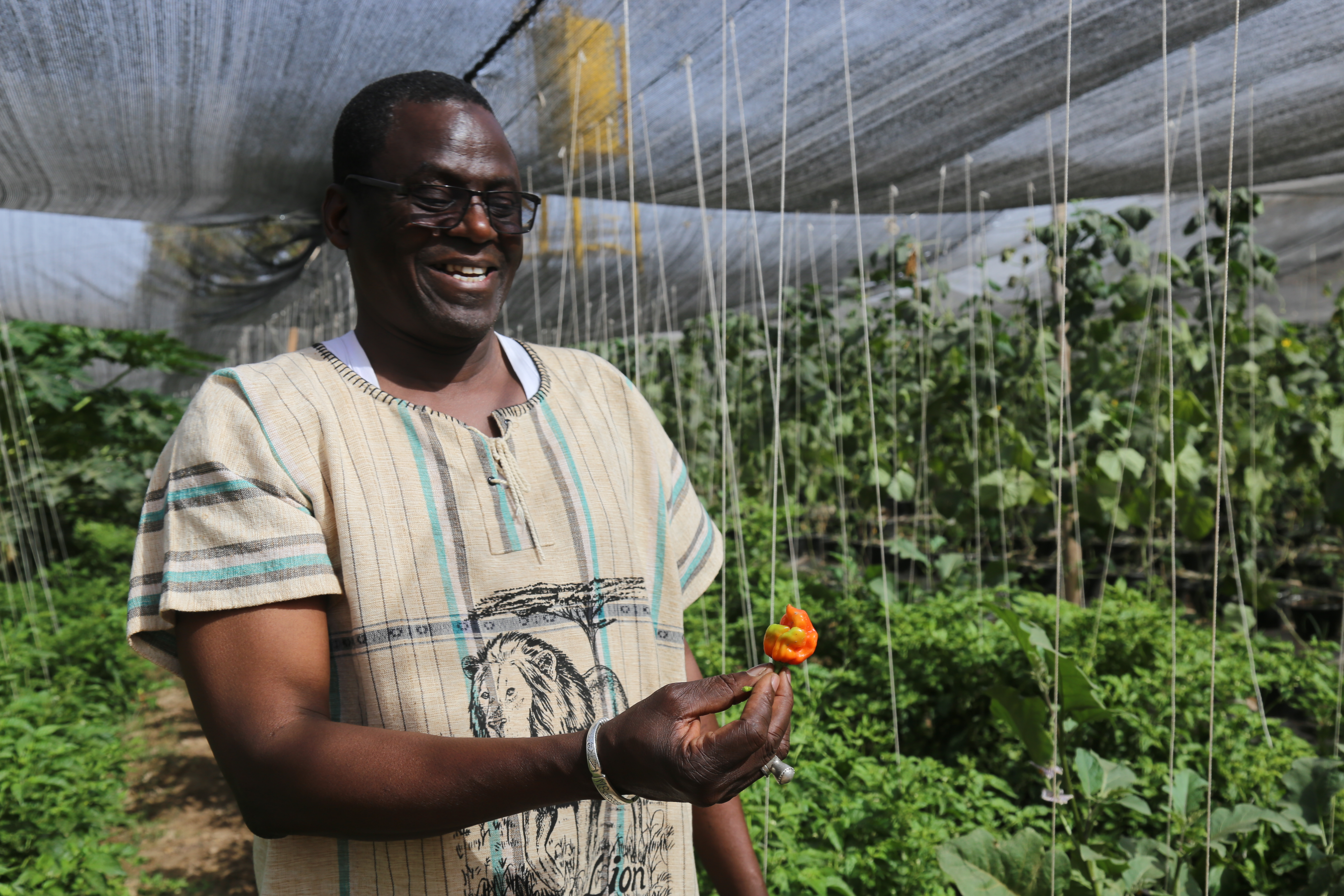
Man in a Sidibé Agro-techniques greenhouse holding a pepper.

The most productive agricultural area lies along the banks of the Niger River between Bamako and Mopti and extends south to the borders of Guinea, Ivory Coast, and Burkina Faso. Average rainfall varies in this region from 500 mm (20 in) per year around Mopti to 1,400 mm (55 in) in the south near Sikasso. This area is most important for the production of cotton, rice, pearl millet, maize, vegetables, tobacco and tree crops.

Annual rainfall, critical for Mali's agriculture, has been at or above average since 1993. Cereal production, including rice, has grown annually, and the 1997–98 cotton harvest reached a record 500,000 tons.

Until the mid-1960s, Mali was self-sufficient in grains — pearl millet, sorghum, rice and maize. Diminished harvests during bad years, a growing population, changing dietary habits, and, most importantly, policy constraints on agricultural production resulted in grain deficits almost every year from 1965 to 1986.

Production has rebounded since 1987 due to agricultural policy reforms undertaken by the government and supported by the Western donor nations. Liberalization of producer prices and an open cereals market have created incentives to production. These reforms, combined with adequate rainfall, successful integrated rural agriculture programs in the south, and improved management of the Office du Niger, have led to surplus cereal production over the past five years.

=== Rice ===
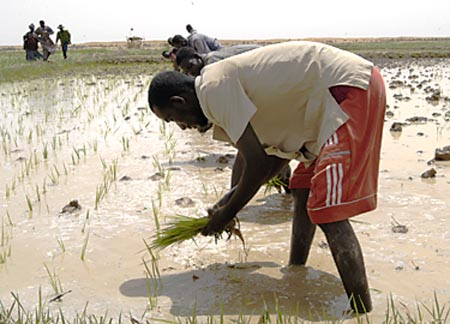
Rice planting in Mali

Rice is grown extensively along the banks of the Niger between Ségou and Mopti, with the most important rice-producing area at the Office du Niger, located north of Ségou toward the Mauritanian border. Using water diverted from the Niger, the Office du Niger irrigates about 600 km^{2} (230 sq mi) of land for rice and sugarcane production. About one-third of Mali's paddy rice is produced at the Office du Niger.

=== Sorghum ===
Sorghum is planted extensively in the drier parts of the country and along the banks of the Niger in eastern Mali, as well as in the lake beds in the Niger delta region. During the wet season, farmers near the town of Dire have cultivated wheat on irrigated fields for hundreds of years. Peanuts are grown throughout the country but are concentrated in the area around Kita, west of Bamako.

=== Livestock ===
In 2019, Mali produced 276 million liters of cow's milk, 270 million liters of camel milk, 243 million liters of goat milk, 176 million liters of sheep's milk, 187 thousand tons of beef, 64 thousand tons of lamb meat, 54 thousand tons of chicken meat, among others.

Mali's resource in livestock consists of millions of cattle, sheep, and goats. Approximately 40% of Mali's herds were lost during the great drought in 1972–74. The level was gradually restored, but the herds were again decimated in the 1983–85 drought. The overall size of Mali's herds is not expected to reach pre-drought levels in the north of the country, where encroachment of the desert has forced many nomadic herders to abandon pastoral activities and turn instead to farming.

The largest concentrations of cattle are in the areas north of Bamako and Ségou extending into the Niger delta, but herding activity is gradually shifting southward, due to the effects of previous droughts. Sheep, goats, and camels are raised to the exclusion of cattle in the dry areas north and east of Timbuktu.

== Fishing ==
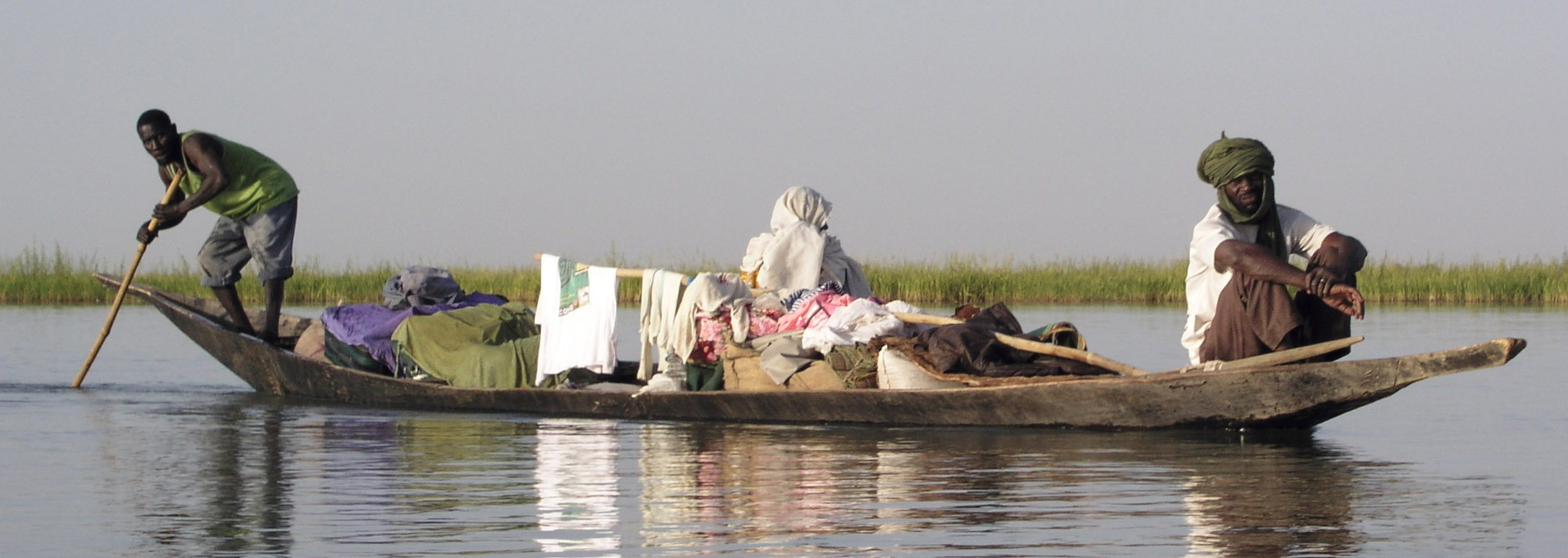
A pirogue carrying two passengers on the River Niger at Gao in Mali

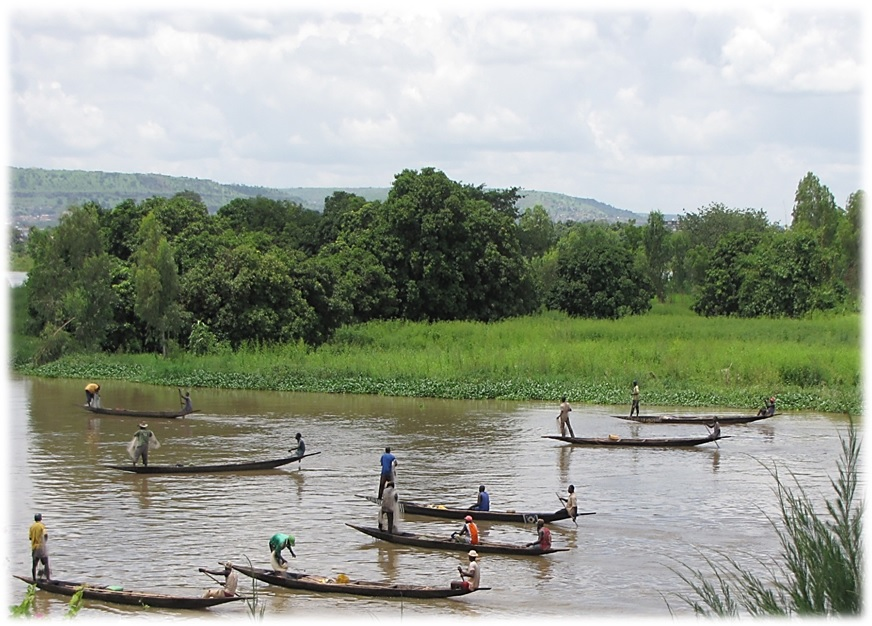
Fishermen on a river in Mali

The Niger River is also an important source of fish, providing food for riverside communities; the surplus—smoked, salted, and dried—is exported. Due to drought and diversion of river water for agriculture, fish production has steadily declined since the early 1980s.

== Mining and resources ==
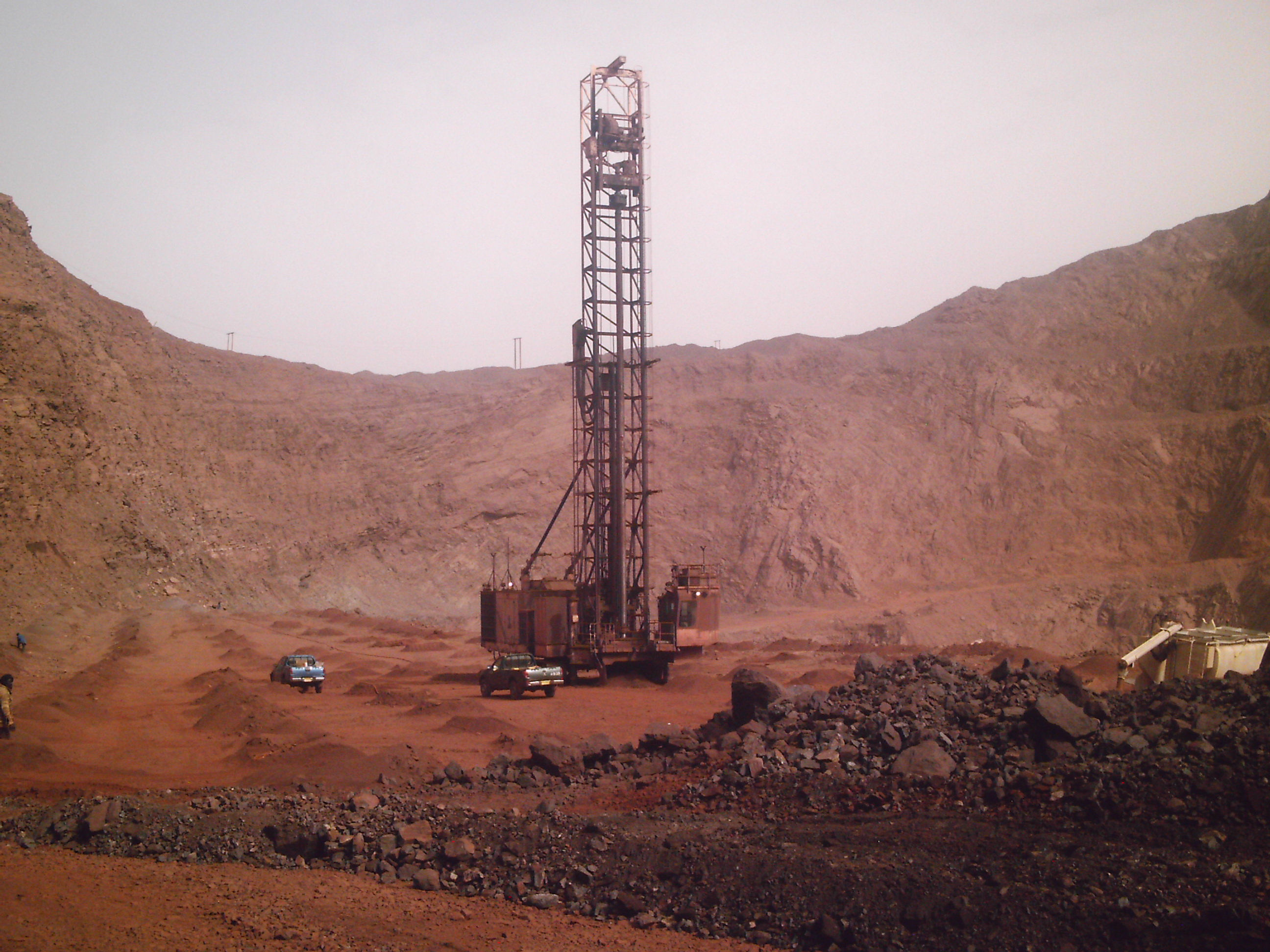
Drilling for oil in the Taoudeni basin

Mining has long been an important aspect of the Malian economy. Gold, the largest source of Malian exports, is still mined in the southern region and at the end of the 20th century Mali had the third highest gold production in Africa (after South Africa and Ghana). These goldfields, the largest of which lie in the Bambouk Mountains in western Mali (Kenieba Cercle), were a major source of wealth and trade as far back as the Ghana Empire.

Salt mining in the far north, especially in the Saharan oases of Taoudenni and Taghaza have been a crucial part of the Malian economy for at least seven hundred years. Both resources were vital components of the Trans-Saharan trade, stretching back to the time of the Roman Empire.

From the 1960s to the 1990s state owned mining—especially for gold—expanded, followed by a period of expansion by international contract mining.

In 1991, following the lead of the International Development Association, Mali relaxed the enforcement of mining codes which led to greater foreign investment in the mining industry. From 1994 to 2007, national and foreign companies were granted around 150 operating licences along with more than 25 certificates for exploitation and more than 200 research permits. Gold mining in Mali has increased dramatically, with more than 50 tonnes in 2007 from less than half a tonne produced annually at the end of the 1980s. Mining revenue totaled some 300 billion CFA francs in 2007 more than a thirty times increase from the 1995 total national mining revenue of less than 10 billion CFA. Government revenues from mining contracts, less than 1% of the state income in 1989 were almost 18% in 2007.

=== Gold ===
In 2019, the country was the 16th largest world producer of gold.

Gold accounted for some 80% of mining activity in the mid-2000s, while there remained considerable proven reserves of other minerals not currently exploited. Gold has become Mali's largest export, after cotton—historically the basis of Mali's export industry—and livestock. The emergence of gold as Mali's leading export product since 1999 has helped mitigate some of the negative impacts caused by fluctuations in world cotton markets and loss of trade from the Ivorian Civil War to the south. Large private investments in gold mining include AngloGold Ashanti ($250 million) in Sadiola and Yatela, and Randgold Resources ($140 million) in Morila – both multinational South African companies located respectively in the north-western and southern parts of the country.

==== Social and environmental impacts ====
While great incomes are produced, most staff employed in the mining industries are from outside Mali, and residents in the areas of intensive mining complain of little benefit from the industry. Populations complain of displacement for the construction of mines: at Sadiola Gold Mine, 43 villages have lost some land to the mine there, while in Fourou, near the large Syama goldmines, 121 villages saw some displacement.

In addition, the continued exploitation of unregulated small scale mining, often by child laborers, supplies a large international gold market in Bamako which feeds into international production. Recent criticism has surfaced around the working conditions, pay, and the widespread use of child labor in these small gold mines (as reported recently in the U.S. Department of Labor's List of Goods Produced by Child Labor or Forced Labor), and the method with which middlemen, in regional centers like Sikasso and Kayes, purchase and transport gold. Gold collected in the towns is sold on—with almost no regulation or oversight—to larger merchant houses in Bamako or Conakry, and eventually to smelters in Europe. Ecological factors, especially pollution of water by mine tailings, is a major source of concern.

=== Other minerals ===
Other mining operations include kaolin, salt, phosphate, and limestone. The government is trying to generate interest in the potential of extracting petroleum from the Taoudeni basin.

== Manufacturing ==
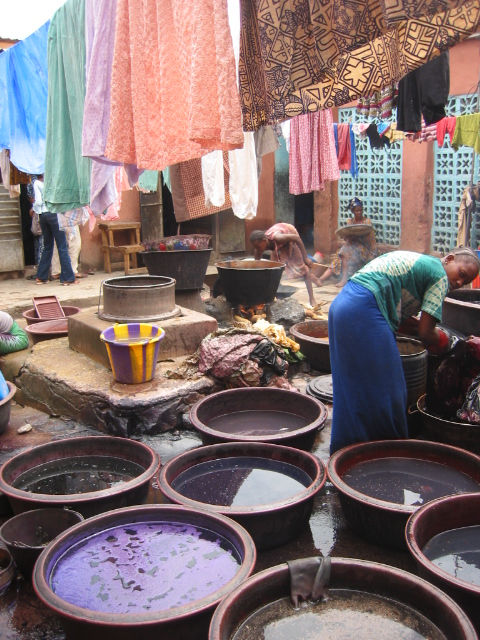
Dyeing bezin, one of several types of cloth made in Mali.

During the colonial period, private capital investment was virtually nonexistent, and public investment was devoted largely to the Office du Niger irrigation scheme and to administrative expenses. Following independence, Mali built some light industries with the help of various donors. Manufacturing, consisting principally of processed agricultural products, accounted for about 8% of the GDP in 1990.

== Foreign aid ==
Mali residents are mostly French speaking. Mali is a major recipient of foreign aid from many sources, including multilateral organizations (most significantly the World Bank, African Development Bank, and Arab Funds), and bilateral programs funded by the European Union, France, United States, Canada, Netherlands, and Germany. Cooperation from Brazil has been growing quickly, especially in cotton production, by means of developing cotton seeds adapted to the Malian soil. Since 2009, Brazilian cooperation in Mali has raised the quality of the cotton fields and their productivity. Brazilian aide has also started since 2019 in cattle raising and the recovery of eroded soils for agriculture. Before 1991, the former Soviet Union had been a major source of economic and military aid, including construction of a cement plant and the Kalana gold mine.

Currently, aid from Russia is restricted mainly to training and provision of spare parts. Chinese aid remains high, and Chinese-Malian joint venture companies have become more numerous in the last 3 years, leading to the opening of a Chinese investment center. The Chinese are major participants in the textile industry and in large scale construction projects, including a bridge across the Niger, a conference center, an expressway in Bamako, and a stadium in Bamako completed in 2001 for the Africa Cup competition in 2002, named Stade du 26 Mars.

In 1998, U.S. assistance reached over $40 million. This included $39 million in sector support through United States Agency for International Development (USAID) programs, largely channeled to local communities through private voluntary agencies; Peace Corps program budget of $2.2 million for more than 160 Volunteers serving in Mali; Self Help and the Democracy Funds of $170,500; and $650,000 designated for electoral support. Military assistance includes $275,000 for the International Military Education Training (IMET) program, $1.6 million for the African Crisis Response Initiative (ACRI), $60,000 for Joint Combined Exercise Training (JCET), and $100,000 for Humanitarian Assistance.

== Statistics ==
Exports of Mali by product category (2019) Chemical products Transportation Machines Mineral products Plastics and rubbers Metals Foodstuffs Precious metals Textiles Instruments Animal products Vegetable products Paper goods Footwear and headwear Miscellaneous Stone and glass Wood products Animal and vegetable bi-products Animal hides Arts and antiques Weapons

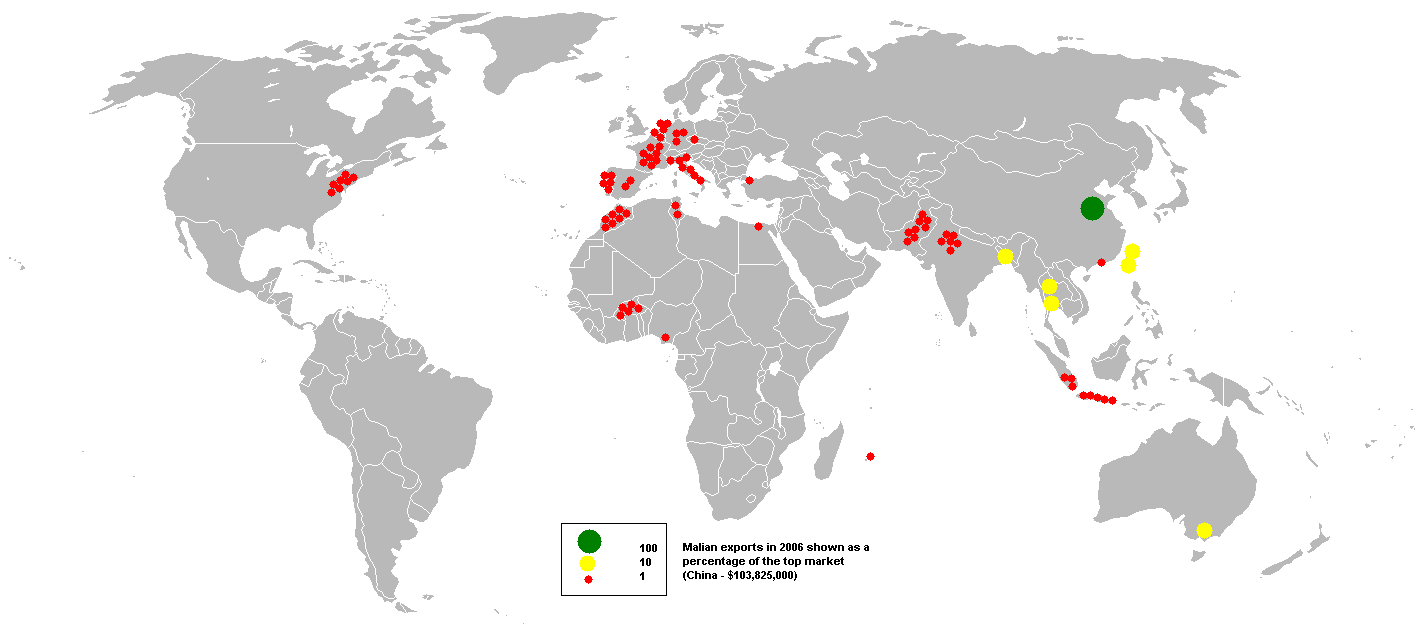
Malian export destinations in 2006

GDP: purchasing power parity – $41.22 billion (2017 est.)

GDP – real growth rate: 5.4% (2017 est.)

GDP – per capita: purchasing power parity – $2,200 (2017 est.)

GDP – composition by sector:
agriculture: 41.8% (2017 est.)
industry: 18.1% (2017 est.)
services: 40.5% (2017 est.)

Population below poverty line: 36.1% (2005 est.)

Household income or consumption by percentage share:
lowest 10%: 2.4% (2001 est.)
highest 10%: 30.2% (2001 est.)

Inflation rate (consumer prices):

1.8% (2017 est.)

Labor force: 6.447 million (2017 est.)

Labor force – by occupation: agriculture and fishing: 80% (2005 est.) industry and services: 20% (2005 est.)

Unemployment rate: 12%

Budget:
revenues: 3.075 billion (2017 est.)
expenditures: 3.513 billion (2017 est.)

Industries: food processing; construction; phosphate and gold mining

Industrial production growth rate: 6.3% (2017 est.)

Electricity – production: 2.489 billion kWh (2016 est.)

Electricity – production by source:
fossil fuel: 68%
hydro: 31%
nuclear: 0%
other: 1% (2017 est.)

Electricity – consumption: 2.982 billion kWh (2016 est.)

Electricity – exports: 0 kWh (2016 est.)

Electricity – imports: 800 million kWh (2016 est.)

Agriculture – products: cotton, pearl millet, rice, corn, maize, vegetables, peanuts; cattle, sheep, goats

Exports: $3.06 billion (2017 est.)

Exports – commodities: cotton 50%, gold, livestock

Exports – partners: Switzerland 31.8%, UAE 15.4%, Burkina Faso 7.8%, Côte d'Ivoire 7.3%, South Africa 5%, Bangladesh 4.6% (2017)

Imports: $3.644 billion (2017 est.)

Imports – commodities: petroleum, machinery and equipment, construction materials, foodstuffs, textiles

Imports – partners: Senegal 24.4%, China 13.2%, Côte d'Ivoire 9%, France 7.3% (2017)

Debt – external: $4.192 billion (31 December 2017 est.)

Economic aid – recipient: $691.5 million (2005)

Currency: 1 Communaute Financiere Africaine franc (CFAF) = 100 centimes

Exchange rates: Communaute Financiere Africaine francs (CFAF) per US$1 – 647.25 (January 2000), 615.70 (1999), 589.95 (1998), 583.67 (1997), 511.55 (1996), 499.15 (1995)
note: since 1 January 1999, the CFAF is pegged to the euro at a rate of 655.957 CFA francs per euro

Fiscal year: calendar year

== See also ==
- Transport in Mali
- Tourism in Mali
- Communications in Mali
- United Nations Economic Commission for Africa
