= Mining industry of Mali =

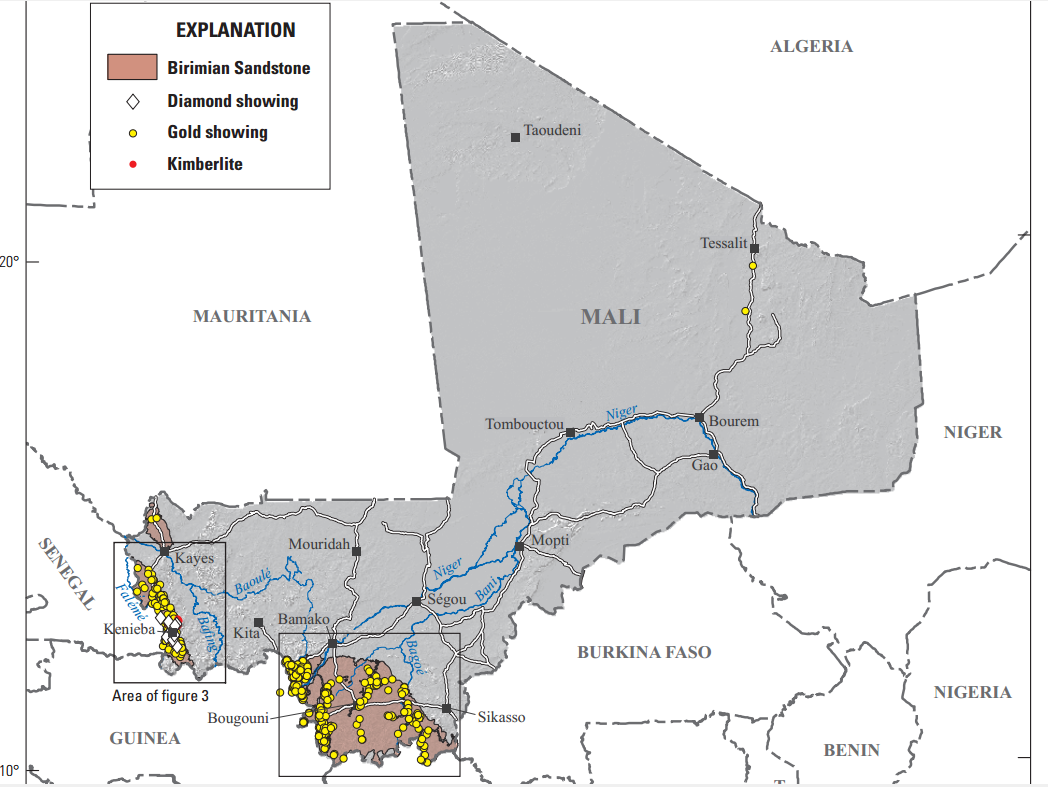
Geological map of Birimian outcrops in Mali, at Bougouni and Kenieba

The mining industry of Mali is dominated by gold extraction but also produces diamonds, rocksalt, phosphates, semi precious stones, bauxite, iron ore, and manganese. The importance of mining and production of raw minerals has changed throughout time and has involved many foreign stakeholders, most notably France, the former Soviet Union, and South Africa. Gold, followed by cotton, is the top export item, making it a large contributor to the country’s economy. Mineral extraction in the country is done both via industrial mining and artisanal mining, and both methods of production have had profound impacts on the economy, sociocultural landscape, and environment.

== History ==
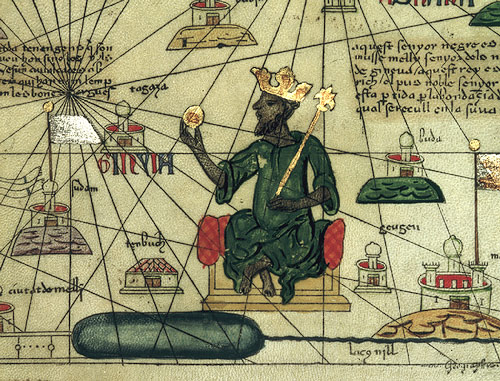
Depiction of Emperor Mansa Musa I with gold

Gold extraction has occurred in Mali from ancient times using simple implements before the modern mechanized system came into practice. This activity is traced to the days of monarchy of the Islamic emperors in the country when salt and gold were major Trans-Saharan trade commodities from Timbuktu and Djenné. In the 1300s, Emperor Mansa Musa I of the Mali Empire particularly profited from gold in the Malian region. He became the richest person to have ever lived in large part due to the trade of gold. The heart of the Mali Empire was located along the Niger River Basin, making it the intersection of many important trans-Saharan trade routes. This allowed Empire Mansa Musa I to control the trade of gold, salt and kola nuts throughout North and West Africa.

During colonial times, the importance of gold in particular declined. Mali was ruled by France for over 75 years, and France did not focus on gold production as a commodity. France was more interested in its coastal colonies like Senegal, and thus many of Mali’s economic sectors went undeveloped. Of all the economic activities in the country, agricultural production was the priority. France developed irrigation systems to grow primarily cotton for export. French colonial rule brought the end of the Trans-Saharan trade, as most all commodities and materials were created for export to enrich France’s economy. Despite these great changes, gold extraction continued throughout the colonial period in local communities. This is known as artisanal mining– gold mining done by hand using basic tools.

Following the country's independence and during the Cold War, industrial gold production in Mali gained steam. The regimes of Moussa Traoré and Modibo Këita, the first two presidents for Mali, were both allies with the Soviet Union, so the first industrial gold mining in the country was primarily a pursuit of the Soviet Union. One of the largest Soviet Union gold mining interventions was funding the development of the Kalana gold mine in southwestern Mali. It was estimated that the mining operation could potentially have 1.4 million ounces of gold, and the Soviet Union was building a plant to process the gold ore. Construction finished on the factory in 1984, but with the collapse of the Soviet Union in 1991, funding and technical support for the operation disappeared. The plant closed. By the mid-1990s, in part due to the collapse of the Soviet Union, most mining in the country was done via South African mining companies. In the current day, some foreign companies are attempting to revitalize closed-down Soviet-supported mines in Mali.

The mining of other minerals have had a similarly complex history.

== By Product ==
=== Gold ===
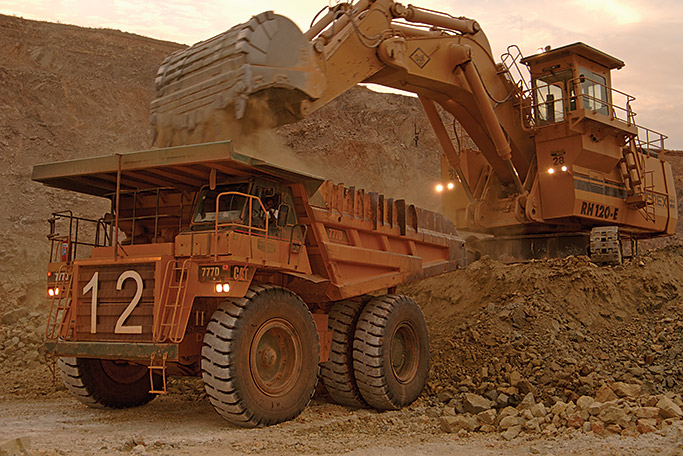
Sadiola Gold Mine

The Sahel region of Africa, which Mali composes with neighboring countries, is an important region for both industrial and artisanal gold mining. Southern regions of Mali–Sikasso, Koulikoro, and Kayes– are located in the heart of the Sahel and produce most of Mali’s gold. Compared to other gold producers in the region and in Africa more broadly, gold in Mali is particularly cheap to extract and profitable for companies. This is because the mines in Mali are surface mines and cost of labor is low. It is estimated that there are 800 tons of gold deposits within the country’s borders, making it the country with the largest deposits of gold in the West African region after Ghana.

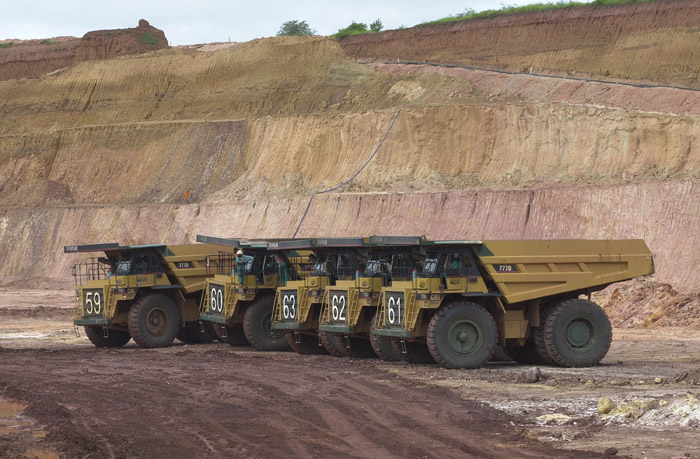
Yatela Gold Mine

Industrial gold mining in Mali is primarily done by foreign investors and companies. Anglogold Ashanti, Randgold, and IAMGold are the three primary mining companies extracting gold. There are other much smaller companies that are involved as well, many of these are Canadian and Australian organizations. In the early years of industrial gold mining in the country, four gold mines produced most of the gold in the country: Sadiola mine, Morila mine, Yatela mine, and Sayama mine. Artisanal gold mining also comprises a large amount of gold that is produced in Mali. There are an estimated 300 to 350 artisanal gold mines in Mali employing about 400,000 workers. Manual gold extraction has been increasing as an economic activity since the late 1980s.

In terms of economic output, gold has grown in importance. From 1984 to 2008, mining accelerated and became a pivotal piece of Mali's economy, increasing from 1.5% of GDP to 8%, leading Mali to become the third largest producer of gold in Africa. Between 1995 and 2000 alone, the production of gold in the country more than doubled. In 2021, gold substantiated 80% of the countries total exports and approximately two million Malians rely on the industry for their livelihood.

Importantly, the smuggling of gold from Mali to other countries has become a heavily politicized issue. Political turmoil in Mali has made the illegal smuggling of gold a growing problem. The Malian government has been losing its control over gold-producing regions in the south of the country, and the French army has also been unable to halt the exploitation of gold at the hand of mafia-like groups. Additionally, since Malian gold mining often involves a variety of international actors, gold smuggling can become a diplomatic issue. In 2021, a high-profile case involving 133 kilograms of Malian gold ingots smuggled and apprehended in South Africa led to heightened tensions between Mali, Madagascar, and the United Arab Emirates.

=== Other minerals ===
Apart from gold, diamond is also extracted, mainly from the Kéniéba region 500 kilometres (310 mi) west from Bamako. Many more prospected kimberlite pipes with diamondiferous are yet to be put into production stage. Phosphate is mined from the Tilemsi Valley, but to a limited extent. Other established mineral resources are

- bauxite reserves of 1.1 billion tons from three locations between Kéniéba and Bamako
- iron ore reserves of 146 million tons of 50% Fe grade, mostly from Ble
- manganese reserve of 10 million tons at Asongo.

Semiprecious stones extracted are amethyst, epidote, garnet, prehnite, and quartz. Some amount of diamond is also extracted as a byproduct during gold extraction. Gold mining is carried out by 13 international mining companies. The United States Geological Survey estimates that Mali has 700,000 tons of lithium resources.

== Impacts of Natural Resource Extraction ==
=== Economic Development ===
As it pertains to the national economy, industrial mineral extraction has not led to much economic development. All of the gold that is extracted within the country is entirely for export, about 59.2% of it goes to South Africa, and the other 40.8% goes to Switzerland. While the industry brings in revenue, it has not led to the development of a processing industry that would bring more technology, infrastructure, and jobs to the country.

Artisanal gold mining has been credited with contributing to the development of local economies. The growth of artisanal gold mining has brought many migrants to the southern Mali Sahel, 92% of which say they came to artisanal mines for job opportunities. In one study on artisanal gold miners in the country, 66% of miners reported that their quality of life improved after beginning mining. The communities there have developed in part due to a wave of migrants in other professions like shop owners, drivers, and restaurant owners who are bringing services and businesses to support miners.

=== Socio-cultural Impacts ===
The mining industry of Mali has had widespread sociocultural impacts. The development of industrial mining in many cases has led to the expropriation of land from indigenous peoples, sometimes displacing entire communities. At the Sadiola and Morila mines, agricultural lands were fragmented by the mines’ occupation of land, and livestock have been killed and stolen with the increased amount of roads and dangerous mining equipment. Industrial mining has also been a point of concern for human rights and workers’ rights. Mines in Mali have played a role in worsening the HIV/AIDS epidemic with an increase in prostitution occurring at mines, and on-site health facilities have been criticized as lacking.

Artisanal gold mining hotspots have brought many migrants to Mali, and children compose much of the workforce at these sites. Children pursuing artisanal gold mining in Mali has been noted as a particular concern for children's rights. Children are often pulled out of school to work for wages in artisanal mines. While most children are not deep underground in the mines excavating gold, they are often tasked with pulling gold up with ropes and buckets from deep in the mines. Chronic physical pain and exposure to dangerous chemicals are of particular health concern and have been impacting child development.

Environmental degradation has also led to increased contention in extractive regions. Farmers in the areas of gold mining have increasingly been arming themselves out of frustration with destroyed farmlands and declining agricultural activity. Water shortages near the Sadiola gold mine have increased tension between mining companies and community members, leading to protests.

=== Environmental and Public Health Repercussions ===
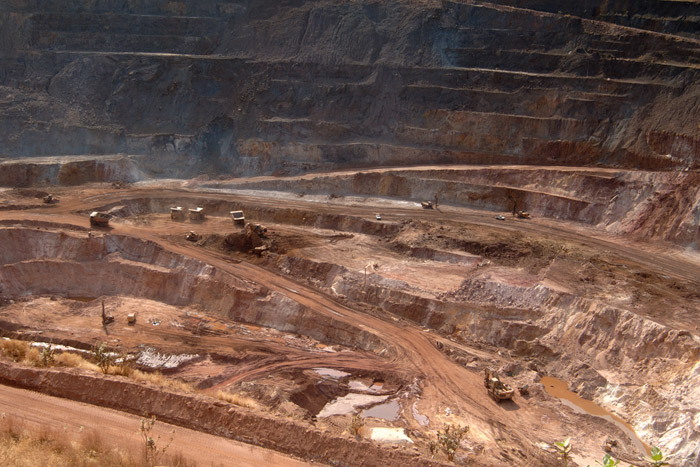
Land Impact at the Yatela Gold Mine

Gold mining has broad implications for both the environment and public health. As it relates to artisanal gold mining, miners often use mercury and cyanide to isolate gold from other mineral compounds. Contamination from the use of these chemicals, often through groundwater when recklessly disposed of at mining sites, can have sweeping effects on human and animal populations. Cyanide poisoning at its worst causes death and paralysis, and in less severe cases, causes nausea, headaches, vertigo, cognitive impairment, respiratory issues, and high blood pressure. Mercury exposure can cause a variety of disorders and cognitive impairment. In addition to issues of contamination, artisanal mines require clearing plant life and dredging of rivers. In Mali, this has led to increased soil erosion, the drying up of rivers, and habitat destruction. Additionally, many artisanal mines are not restored after mining finishes, leaving excess chemicals and destruction.

The proliferation of industrial gold mining has contributed to deforestation, chemical contamination, and water shortages. Poisonous dust from industrial mines has been linked to widespread death of animals. Similar to artisanal mining, cyanide and other chemicals used in industrial mining have made their way into freshwater sources, harming both humans and animals and degrading surrounding agricultural fields. Regional water shortages due to industrial mining operations making certain freshwater sources unsafe have also impacted the environment and human communities.

== Legal framework ==
Mining laws in the country are based on the French legal framework. The laws and regulations in force are: Mining Code: Ordinance N° 91 – 065 / P-CTSP of 19 September 1991; Regulations : Decree N° 91 – 277/PM-RM of 19 September 1991; and Decree No. 91-278/PM-RM of 19 September 1991 for u issuing licences. Convention d'Etablissement, Autorisation de Prospection, Permis de Recherche, and Permis d'exploitation are the normative formats used for signing of agreements with foreign companies at different stages starting from exploration to extraction. The mining permit is issued for a maximum period of 30 years.

== See also ==
- Geology of Mali
- Eburnean orogeny
- Kenieba inlier
- Bambouk
