= Golden Star Resources =

Canadian company operating in Ghana

- Formerly: Southern Star Resources
- Type: Public company
- Traded as: TSX: GSC; AMEX: GSS; GSE: GSR
- Industry: Mining
- Founded: 7 March 1984
- Founder: Dave Fennell, Roger Morton
- Fate: Acquired by Chifeng Jilong Gold Mining Co. Ltd.
- Headquarters: London, United Kingdom
- Key people: Peter Bradford (CEO, 1999-2007); Tom Mair (CEO, 2008-2012); Sam Coetzer (CEO, 2013-2019); Andrew Wray (CEO, 2019-2022)
- Products: Gold
- Subsidiaries: Caystar Holdings (Cayman Islands)
- Website: gsr.com

Golden Star Resources Ltd was a Canadian company that owned and operated the Wassa gold mine in Ghana. The company formerly owned and operated the Bogoso-Prestea gold mine, also in Ghana, from 1999 to 2020. Headquartered in London, but with a registered office in Toronto, it was a public company with shares listed on the Toronto Stock Exchange and cross-listed on the NYSE American and Ghana Stock Exchange. In 2022 the company was acquired by Shanghai Stock Exchange-listed Chifeng Jilong Gold Mining. Golden Star Resources was founded in 1984 by geologist Roger Morton and former football player Dave Fennell to pursue mineral interest in Guyana and formed a joint venture with Cambior to develop the Omai Mine. They changed their focus in 1999 to pursue owning and operating its own gold mines in Ghana.

== History ==
The company was incorporated on 7 March 1984, as Southern Star Resources, though it changed its name to Golden Star Resources on 25 February 1985. The company was founded by geologist Roger Morton and former football player Dave Fennell, and backed by the Sparrow family, specifically Jim and Curtis Sparrow and their employee, politician Don Getty, for the purposes of pursuing exploration and development of mineral deposits in Guyana. They entered into a joint venture with Placer Dome on exploration and then Cambior on development of the Omai gold deposit leaving Golden Star a 35% stake in the deposit once it started producing in 1992. Meanwhile, spun-off Takla Star Resources in 1990 as a separate company to manage certain exploration properties and invested in exploration efforts of Guyana's Mazaruni diamond with Vancouver-based South American Goldfields with whom they merged with in May 1992 in an all-stock deal. In 1993, the company moved its headquarters from Edmonton to Littleton, Colorado, and based on its 35% stake in the Cambior-operated Omai mine and exploration efforts elsewhere it was listed on the TSE 300 index. They pursued another joint venture with Cambior on the exploration of Rosebel gold deposit in Suriname. In 1999, as the company was removed from the TSE 300 index, it sought to change its business strategy from exploration to production by replacing Fennell as CEO with Peter Bradford, acquiring an older producing mine in Ghana, and selling its remaining stakes in Omai and Rosebel to Cambior.

Golden Star Resources got involved in Ghana with their 1999 purchase of a 70% interest in the Bogoso gold mine. They would acquire Anvil Mining's 20% interest in the next few years. Consequently, the company recorded its first attributable gold production in 1999 and would continue to produce over 100,000 ounces of gold a year from the Bogoso gold mine until 2005 when the Wassa mine came online. The company had spent the intervening years conducting the feasibility study and constructing the Wassa mine. While operating those two mines until 2020, the company produced between 200,000 and 400,000 ounces of gold annually. Golden Star Resources sold the Bogoso gold mine and its associated Prestea underground operation, effective October 2020, to new company Future Global Resources, owned by the British private equity firm Blue International Holdings.

During those years, Golden Star Resources moved its headquarters from Colorado to Toronto in 2012 and then to London in 2020. In 2004 the company coordinated with Coeur d'Alene Mines, BMO Nesbitt Burns and CIBC World Markets to break up a proposed merger of Iamgold and Wheaton River Minerals (later purchased by Goldcorp) by launching a hostile takeover bid for Iamgold. The Iamgold board of directors refused the offer but Golden Star Resources filed a lawsuit in the Ontario Superior Court which ordered that Iamgold shareholders must vote on the Golden Star Resources offer, too. The Golden Star bid failed as the Iamgold shareholders also voted against the all-stock deal offer.

Golden Star Resources agreed to be acquired by the Chinese company Chifeng Jilong Gold Mining, a public company listed on the Shanghai Stock Exchange, in an all-cash deal amounting to US$470 million.

== Mining operations ==
Along with several exploration properties Golden Star Resources operated the Wassa Gold Mine. Located in the Wassa East District of the Western Region of Ghana, the Wassa complex consists of an underground and several open-pit mines that access Birimian rocks within the southern portion of the Ashanti Greenstone Belt. Golden Star Resources developed the mining operation with production beginning in April 2005. The Government of Ghana retains 10% ownership of the mine and its production is subject to a gold stream contract owned by Royal Gold.

Golden Star Resources formerly operated the Bogoso-Prestea gold mine which is located in between the towns of Bogoso and Prestea in the Western Region of Ghana. The Bogoso mine was acquired by Golden Star Resources in 1999 with the nearby Prestea underground mine being added in 2001 but they were sold together in 2020. Golden Star Resources was also formerly involved in the Omai gold mine in Cuyuni-Mazaruni, Guyana, which was operated by Cambior, but sold its stake in 2001.
