= Sanso =

- Commune and town
- Location in Mali
- Coordinates: 11°43′N 6°51′W
- Country: Mali
- Region: Sikasso Region
- Cercle: Bougouni Cercle

Population (2009 census)
  - Total: 22,284
- Time zone: UTC+0 (GMT)

Sanso is a small town and commune in the Cercle of Bougouni in the Sikasso Region of south-western Mali. In 2009 the commune had a population of 22,284.

The Morila Gold Mine is located 10 km from the village.
