= Sadiola =

- Commune and Town
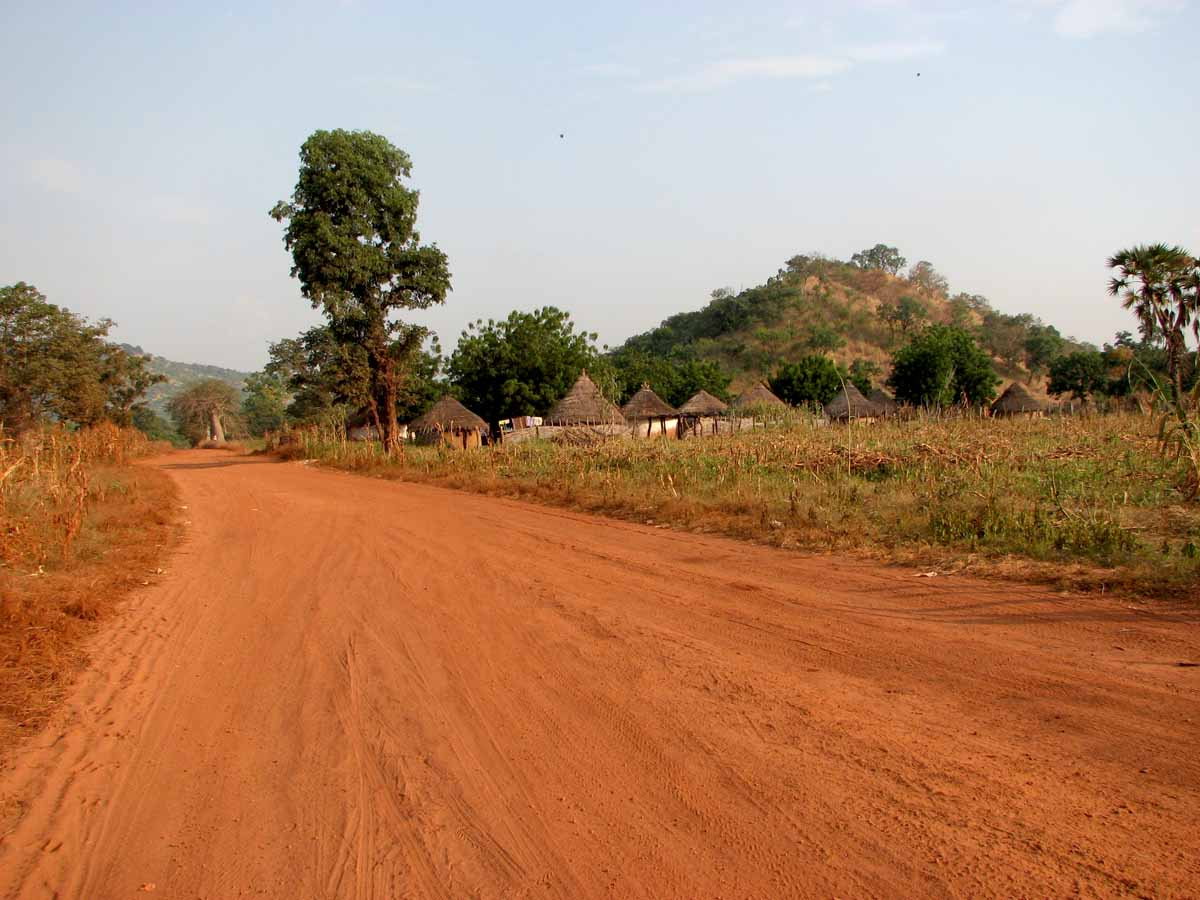
- View of the town

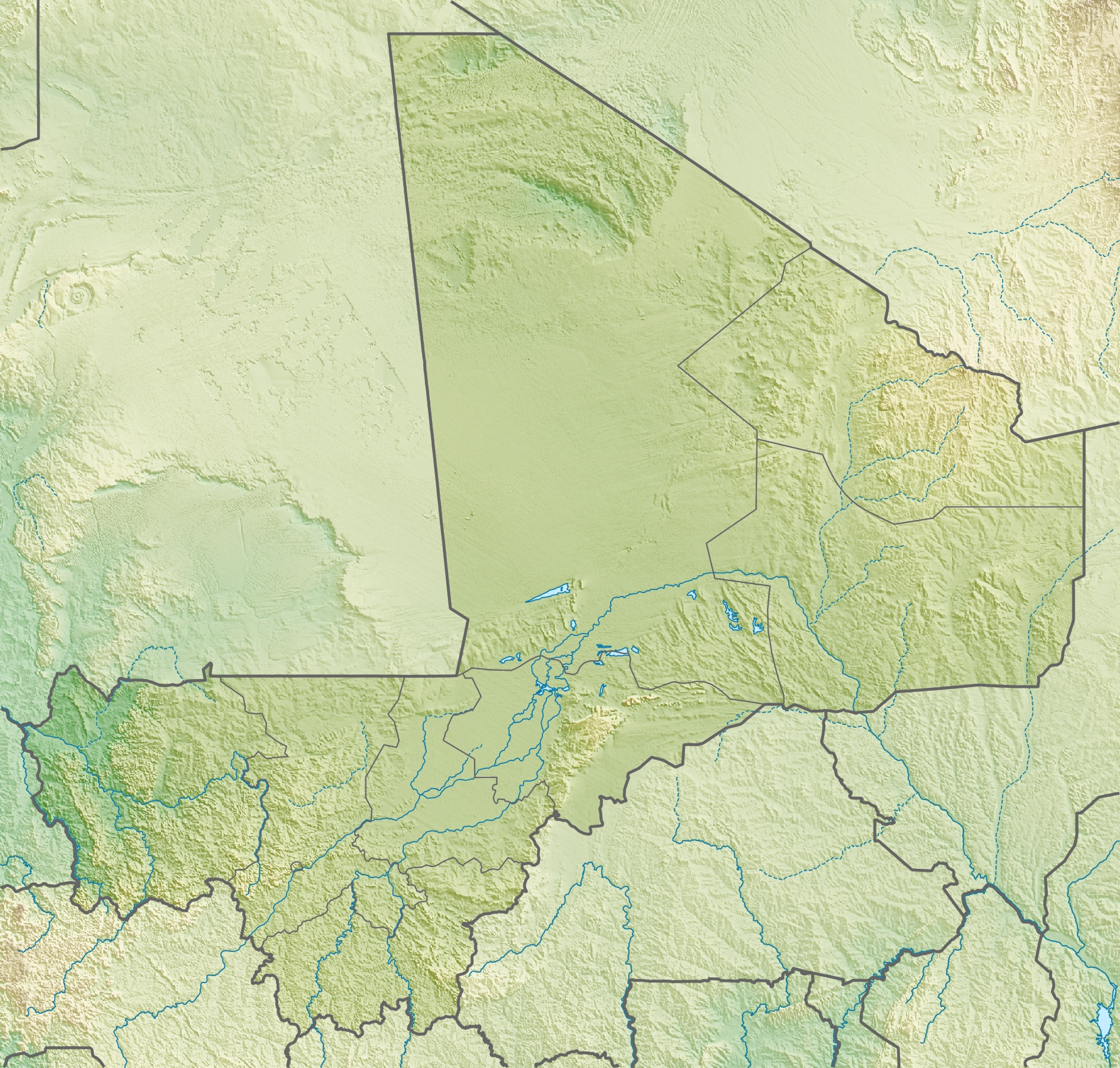
- Location in Mali
- Coordinates: 13°53′20″N 11°42′10″W
- Country: Mali
- Region: Kayes Region
- Cercle: Kayes Cercle

Area
  - Total: 5,010 km^{2} (1,930 sq mi)
- Elevation: 123 m (405 ft)

Population (2009 census)
  - Total: 39,305
  - Density: 7.85/km^{2} (20.3/sq mi)
- Time zone: UTC+00:00 (GMT)

Sadiola is a commune and small town in western Mali, south of Kayes. The commune includes 46 villages and in 2009 had a population of 39,305.

Sadiola has two large open pit gold mines, the Société d'Exploitation des Mines d'Or de Sadiola S.A (SEMOS) also to referred to as the Sadiola Gold Mine, and the Yatela Gold Mine. Both mines were operated by Anglogold-Ashanti as joint ventures with IAMGOLD and the Republic of Mali. In February 2019, Sadiola Exploration Limited ("SADEX"), a subsidiary jointly held by IAMGOLD and AGA entered into an agreement to sell their interest (80%) in Société d’Exploitation des Mines d’Or de Yatela (SEMOY) to the Mali government. By the end of 2020, IAMGOLD and AGA sold 80% of their interests in the Sadiola mine to the private mid-tier producer Allied Gold Corp and 1% to the Republic of Mali (upping their interest from 18% to 20%).
