= Tourism in Mali =

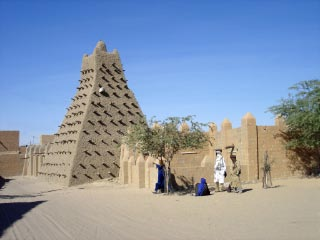
Sankore Mosque in Timbuktu

Tourism in Mali is not well developed. Due to issues with their infrastructure, tourism had been slow to grow but had seen improvements prior to the 2002 Africa Cup of Nations. However, due to the Northern Mali conflict and threats from terrorism, all major tour operators have withdrawn services which saw a decrease in tourists from 200,000 in 2011 to 10,000 the following year. The nation has four UNESCO World Heritage Sites, including Timbuktu.

== Overview ==
Development of the tourist industry was hindered by the country's inadequate transport infrastructure and a shortage of hotels for visitors. Mali hosted the Africa Cup of Nations soccer tournament in 2002. In preparation for this event, the government implemented a social development programme called "Mali 2002". The tourist industry benefited from this programme. However, since then, ongoing conflicts have caused tourism to dwindle due to the ongoing risks of attacks against foreign nationals.

In the early 2000s, around 90,000 tourists visited Mali each year. This had increased to 200,000 by 2011, but following attacks against tourists and the withdrawal by tour operators, this decreased to 10,000 in the following year.

=== Warnings against tourism ===
Since 2012, the British Foreign and Commonwealth Office recommends against all but essential travel to several areas of the country, and a complete ban on travel to others. While this does not mean that travellers from the UK cannot travel there, they would have to do so independently and without insurance. There are no direct flights to Mali from the United Kingdom, nor do any major British tour operators offer travel to the country. It describes the situation in Mali as "still unstable and there is a high threat from terrorism, attacks could be indiscriminate, including in places frequented by expatriates and foreign travellers.", and highlights potential retaliation against Western tourists following the 2013 intervention by France in the Northern Mali conflict.

== Attractions ==
The National Museum of Mali in Bamako houses an extensive collection of Malian art, artifacts, and cultural exhibits.

=== Festivals ===
The country had been noted for its festivals, especially the Festival au Désert which had been held since 2001 but was put on hold in 2013 because of the security issues.

=== UNESCO World Heritage Sites ===
Mali has four UNESCO World Heritage Sites, including the well known city of Timbuktu. This has been on the UNESCO danger list since 2012, which the organisation describes as "an intellectual and spiritual capital and a centre for the propagation of Islam throughout Africa in the 15th and 16th centuries, its three great mosques, Djingareyber, Sankore and Sidi Yahia, recall Timbuktu's golden age. Although continuously restored, these monuments are today under threat from desertification." The other three include Bandiagara Escarpment, Djenné and the Tomb of Askia.

Location of World Heritage Sites within Mali

== Visitor statistics ==
Most visitors arriving to Mali for tourism purposes were from the following countries of nationality:

Country	2014	2013
France	31,580	21,717
Senegal	8,308	7,464
Côte d’Ivoire	7,632	6,432
United States	4,479	3,946
Burkina Faso	3,793	3,402
Guinea	3,508	3,816
China	3,201	2,687
Netherlands	2,299	637
Congo	2,036	1,582
Ghana	2,003	1,707
Total	110,529	85,315
