= Cambior =

Cambior Inc. was a Canadian based international gold producer with operations, development projects and exploration activities in the Americas. Cambior's shares traded on the Toronto (TSX) and American (AMEX) stock exchanges under the symbol "CBJ". Cambior's warrants "CBJ.WT.C" traded on the TSX. In November 2006 IAMGOLD acquired 100% of Cambior shares.

== Formation ==
The company results from the privatization of the major discoveries in Quebec by Soquem, the Crown Company in 1986: Mine Doyon, Ressources Aiguebelle, Sullivan, and 50% of the Niobec mine near Chicoutimi.

== Omai mine acid spill ==
In August 1995 there was an acid spill from the Omai mine tailings dam in the river by the Canadian mining company Cambior in the Essequibo region of Guyana. An estimated 4 000 000 m³ of waste laced with cyanide, other heavy metals and other pollutants were released into the river causing much destruction. Thousands of dead fish were found floating on the river used by Amerindians, the Native Indians of Guyana. An estimated 23,000 people who live in the region surrounding the river, depend on the river for drinking water, bathing and fishing. A public interest group filed a class-action lawsuit against Cambior in 1997 in Québec Superior Court seeking damages on behalf of the Guyanese victims of the spill. The Omai Mine is wholly owned by Omai Gold Mines Limited (OGML). At the time of the spill, Cambior owned 65% of this company and the balance was owned by Golden Star Resources and the Government of Guyana. In 2002, Cambior acquired Golden Star's interest in OGML, thereby obtaining a 95% ownership interest in the company.

The Québec Superior Court dismissed the case in August 1998, on the grounds that the courts in Guyana were in a better position to hear the case. A lawsuit against Cambior was filed in Guyana, but it was dismissed by the High Court of the Supreme Court of Judicature of Guyana in 2002. A new suit was filed against Cambior in 2003 in Guyana again seeking US$2billion in damages for the effects of the 1995 spill. In October 2006, the High Court of the Supreme Court of Judicature of Guyana ordered the dismissal of the 2003 action and ordered the plaintiffs to pay the defendants' legal costs.

== Operations ==
The company's operations included sites in French Guiana, Guyana, Peru and Suriname in South America, and Mali among other countries in West Africa.

== Acquisition ==
Cambior was acquired by Iamgold in November 2006.
