= Iamgold =

Canadian mining company

Iamgold Corporation
- Formerly: International African Mining Gold Corporation
- Type: Public
- Traded as: TSX: IMG; NYSE: IAG
- Industry: Gold mining
- Founded: March 27, 1990 (36 years ago)
- Founders: Mark I. Nathanson; William D. Pugliese
- Headquarters: Toronto, Ontario, Canada
- Number of locations: 3 mines
- Key people: David Smith (Chair of the Board); Renaud Adams (President & CEO); Maarten Theunissen (CFO)
- Products: Gold
- Production output: ▲762,000 oz (2019)
- Revenue: ▲US$1.095 billion (2017)
- Operating income: ▲US$580.0 million (2017)
- Net income: ▲US$510.5 million (2017)
- Total assets: ▲US$3,966.9 million (2017)
- Total equity: ▲US$2,846.8 million (2017)
- Number of employees: 4,832
- Subsidiaries: Essakane S.A. Merrex Gold Inc. Euro Ressources S.A.
- Website: iamgold.com

Iamgold Corporation (formerly Iamgold International African Mining Gold Corporation) is a Canadian company that owns and operates gold mines in Burkina Faso and Canada. Headquartered in Toronto, the company was incorporated in 1990, and went public on the Toronto Stock Exchange in 1996, with additional shares being listed on the New York Stock Exchange beginning in 2005. The company formerly owned or had stakes in the Sadiola and Yatela gold mines in Mali, the Mupane gold mine in Botswana, the Niobec niobium mine in Quebec, as well as a royalty in the Diavik Diamond Mine.

== Operations ==
Iamgold operates three mines: the Essakane gold mine; the Westwood gold mine; and the Côté Gold mine.

The company's largest operating mine is located in Burkina Faso. Iamgold subsidiary company Essakane S.A. operates the Essakane gold mine with the Government of Burkina Faso owning a 10% stake. It is an open pit mine, with heap leach processing, along the Gorouol River near the town of Falagountou and the border with Niger. It was acquired by Iamgold in 2009 from Orezone Resources who had conducted exploration and development activities. The mine began commercial production in July 2010. With 3.8 million ounces in proved and probable reserves as of 2020, the mine has produced approximately 350,000-450,000 ounces of gold per year.

In the Abitibi Municipality of Quebec, Iamgold acquired the Doyon Division mining property with its 2006 acquisition of Cambior. As its older Doyon mine ceased production in 2009, the facilities were re-purposed to support the developing and operation of the new Westwood gold mine which began commercial production in 2014. The ore from the open pit mine is processing at the refurbished Doyon mill using the carbon in pulp method. Zinc deposits. With 1.2 million ounces in proved and probable reserves as of 2020, the mine has produced around 100,000 ounces of gold per year.

The company involvement in the Côté Gold mine began in 2012 when it acquired Trelawney Mining and Exploration which held the mineral rights. In 2017, with a preliminary economic assessment estimating a 21-year mine life producing an average of 302,000 ounces of gold annually at an all-in sustaining cost of $686/oz, Iamgold sold a 30% stake in Côté Gold to Sumitomo Metal Mining. A feasibility study completed the next year estimated the open pit mine would require an initial capital cost of $1.15 billion and adjusted the estimated production numbers to 367,000 ounces of gold annually over 16 year life span. Construction on the mine was started in September 2020, and commercial production was achieved on August 2, 2024.

== Corporate history ==
The Iamgold International African Mining Gold Corporation (re-named Iamgold Corporation in 1997) was founded on March 27, 1990, by businessmen Mark Nathanson and William Pugliese to pursue a mining concession being offered in Mali. Headquartered in Markham, Ontario, the company partnered with South African gold mining company Anglo American's AngloGold Ashanti to develop the Sadiola Gold Mine. To fund this, Iamgold raised $60 million in an initial public offering becoming a publicly listed company on the Toronto Stock Exchange in 1996, with an additional $13 million worth of shares being issued the following year. With the success of developing the Sadiola Gold Mine, Iamgold and AngloGold Ashanti developed a second mine, the Yatela Mine, which began production in 2001. With profits now being realized, Iamgold was listed on the TSE 300 index and began issuing dividends to shareholders, uniquely the dividends were paid in bullion instead of cash. Additional shares were issued in 2002 and they company became listed on the American Stock Exchange. The company incurred a court-ordered $1.7 million fine, payable to Kinbauri Gold for withdrawing from a merger agreement. Also in late-2002, in a $218 million in all-stock deal, Iamgold acquired royalty company Repadre Capital Corp. which had stakes in several gold and diamond mines in Canada and Africa, most significant of which was a 19% interest in Gold Fields's Tarkwa and Damang mines in Ghana. With Repadre's Joseph Conway taking over as CEO of the combined company, the merger boosted Iamgold's attributable gold production to 421,000 ounces from 290,000 ounces the year before.

After moving its headquarters from Markham to Toronto, the directors and CEOs of Iamgold and Wheaton River Minerals Ltd. agreed to a merger deal that would create a new company to be called Axiom Gold, valued at about $2.9 billion in 2004. However Iamgold stakeholders fought the proposal. BMO Nesbitt Burns and CIBC World Markets organized competing offers, Golden Star Resources Ltd. to acquire Iamgold for $1.2-billion and Coeur d'Alene Mines Corp. to acquire Wheaton River for $2.56 billion, whose rejection by the Iamgold and Wheaton River board of directors was fought in court. While the shareholder votes were delayed due to the court cases, Wheaton River shareholders voted in favour of the merger but Iamgold shareholders rejected it. The company subsequently made a failed bid to acquire assets of Gold Fields. With the failed merger and acquisition behind them, in the next two years the company acquired Australian company Gallery Gold and its Mupane gold mine in Botswana in an $235 million all-stock deal, and Cambior with its Rosebel mine in Suriname, a Niobium mine in Quebec and several older Quebec gold mines in a $1.2 billion deal. With 100% interest in the Mupane, Doyon & Mouska, Sleeping Giant and Niobec mines, as well as a 95% interest in the Rosebel mine, the mergers transitioned the company from an investor into an operator and increased their attributable gold production from 642,000 ounces in 2006 to 965,000 ounces in 2007, and peaking at 997,000 ounces in 2008. The company fared well during the 2008 recession with its stock falling from $8 per share at the beginning of the year to bottoming out at $4 in October and peaking again at $20 by November 2009. They sold off numerous non-core assets, such as royalties acquired from Repadre, the La Arena copper project in Peru acquired from Cambior, and closed the Sleeping Giant (selling the mill and remaining property), and Doyon mines. In the same timeframe, they initiated plans to develop the Westwood mine using the Doyon property and acquired Orezone Resources Inc. and its Essakane Project in Burkina Faso.

While 2008 proved to be their best year in terms of gold production, the company's stock price peaked in 2011 at $21.40. After CEO Joseph Conway stepped down in January 2010, replaced by interim CEO Peter Jones until Enbridge executive Stephen Letwin was hired, the Essakane mine had commenced production in July 2010. In June 2011, Iamgold sold its 19% stake in the Tarkwa and Damang gold mines in Ghana to Gold Fields Limited for $667 million and its Mupane gold mine in Botswana to Galane Gold Ltd. for $34 million. In 2012, in a $608-million purchase, Iamgold acquired Trelawney Mining and Exploration and its Côté Lake gold deposit, near Sudbury, Ontario which they believed could be developed into a significant mine; although a 30% stake had to be sold to Sumitomo Metal Mining to help fund its development. While the sales also helped finance the expansion of Essakane and the development of the Westwood mine, production would peak again at 882,000 ounces in 2017 and 2018, before falling to 762,000 ounces in 2019 as the Yatela mine became exhausted and Sadiola mine was sold in December 2019. Looking towards future projects, Iamgold purchased Merrex Gold and its Siribaya-Diakha exploration property in Mali.

On October 18, 2022, Iamgold sold its Surinamese assets to Chinese miner, Zijin Mining, in order to fund the Côté Gold mine.

=== Past mines (divested and closed) ===
Since opening the Sadiola Gold Mine in 1996, Iamgold has held stakes or outright owned numerous mines that later sold or ceased operation.

- The Sadiola Gold Mine in Mali was operated by joint-venture partner AngloGold Ashanti, each with a 41% working interest. It was sold to Allied Gold in 2019.
- The Yatela Mine gold mine in Mali was operated by joint-venture partner AngloGold Ashanti, each with a 40% working interest. Mining activities had ceased in 2013, though processing continued into 2016.
- The Tarkwa mine and Damang mine in Ghana were operated by Gold Fields. Iamgold secured a 19% stake in the mines with the acquisition of Repadre Capital in 2002 but sold their interests to Gold Fields in 2011.
- The Mupane gold mine in Botswana, opened in 2004, was secured with the acquisition of Gallery Gold in 2005. Its 100% interest in the mine was sold in 2011 to Galane Gold, though Iamgold retained 48% interest in Galane until 2016 when the company totally divested.
- The Doyon and Mouska gold mines in Abitibi, Quebec, were secured with the acquisition of Cambior in 2006. Though the Doyon mine, which had opened in 1980, closed in 2008, its mill was refurbished and upgraded for processing the Westwood mine's ore with treated material being disposed of in the old Doyon open pit. The Mouska mine continued until 2014 before being decommissioned.
- The Sleeping Giant gold mine (known in French as Mine Géant Dormant) in Quebec was also acquired in 2006 with Cambior but sold to Cadiscor Resources in 2008.
- La Arena, a Peruvian copper / gold project acquired with Cambior was sold to Rio Alto Mining in 2008.
- The Niobec underground mine near Chicoutimi, Quebec. This mine is North America's only source of pyrochlore, the primary niobium ore, and one of only three major producers of niobium. Sold to Magris Resources in 2015.
- The Rosebel gold mine in Suriname, acquired in 2006, sold on October 18, 2022 to Zijin Mining
