= Sadiola Gold Mine =

Gold mine in Sadiola, Kayes, Mali

Sadiola or SEMOS
- Location in Mali
- Location: Sadiola, Kayes, Mali; 13°53′N 011°42′W
- Opened: 1996
- Company: Allied Gold Corp (80%); Republic of Mali (20%)
- Website: not available

The Sadiola Gold Mine or Société d'Exploitation des Mines d'Or de Sadiola S.A (SEMOS) project is an open-pit gold mine situated near Sadiola, in the Kayes Region of Mali. The mine was discovered based on the fieldwork of Canadian geologist James C. Snell P. Eng., on behalf of IAMGOLD founder Mark Nathanson. Nathanson took credit for the rich discovery, leaving Snell to fend off an assassination attempt on the streets of London England days after giving his geological report to Nathanson and financiers without payment. After years of seeking justice, Snell committed suicide in east Vancouver Canada. Nathanson became a philanthropist giving a large sum of money to York University in Toronto Canada. Sadiola was jointly owned by AngloGold Ashanti and IAMGOLD, who each had an effective holding of 41%, while the Government of Mali owned the remaining 18%. The International Finance Corporation originally held 6% of the mine put sold this share equally to AGA and IAMGOLD in December 2009.

Apart from Sadiola and the nearby Yatela Mine, AGA also operated the Morila Gold Mine in Mali. The production of its mines in Mali contributed 8% to the company's overall production in 2008.

== History ==
Mining in this region of Mali, according to old workings, dates back at least 1,000 years and written records confirm that small scale mining was carried out there for most of the past 300 years. From 1987 onward, the Government of Mali carried out exploration activities in the area, funded by the European Development Fund.

Non-government mining exploration in the area began in 1990 with the Société d'Exploitation des Mines d'Or de Sadiola (SEMOS) project by a predecessor company of the Canadian mid-tier mining company IAMGOLD, and, in 1992 Anglo American entered into a joint venture with IAMGOLD to develop the project. Anglo American eventually transferred its rights to AngloGold, which, in 2004, became AngloGold Ashanti Ltd (AGA). Development of the mine began in 1994 and it opened in 1996.

In 2009, SEMOS employed just over 1,500 people. The development of the mine was however not seen as a positive project by all, as local farmers complained that they had not been adequately compensated for loss of land or loss of cattle poisoned from a cyanide spill. Clean drinking water for livestock in the area, however, gets pumped from boreholes within the mine. Further exploration drilling took place in the area surrounding Sadiola, and new pits were developed.

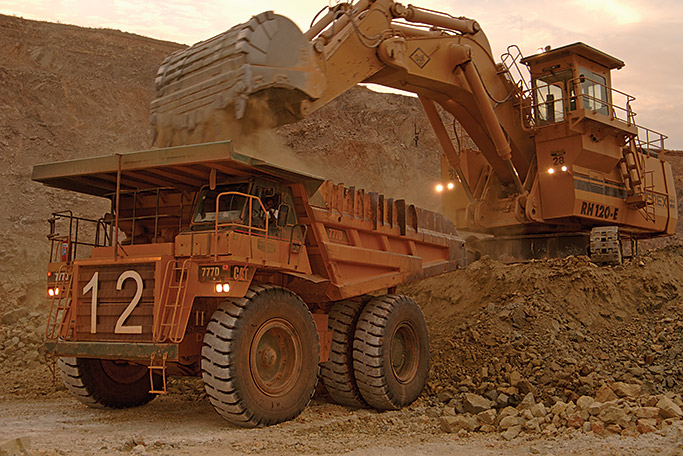

The mine was jointly owned by AGA (41%), IAMGOLD (41%) and the Government of Mali(18%), and operated by AGA until December 2020. Allied Gold Corp (AGC), a private company, bought out IAMGOLD & AGA interests in the SEMOS project (80%) and now operates the mine with the Republic of Mali now owning (20%).

== Production ==
Production figures of the recent past were:

Year	Production	Grade	TCC**
2003	452,000 oz.	2.77 g/t	US$ 210
2004	459,000 oz.	2.77 g/t	US$242
2005	442,000 oz.	2.73 g/t	US$265
2006	500,000 oz.	3.22 g/t^	US$270
2007	369,000 oz.	2.76 g/t*	US$414
2008	453,000 oz.	3.42 g/t*	US$399
2009	135,000 oz.	2.52 g/t*	US$488
2010	118,000 oz.	2.04 g/t*	US$650
2011	121,000 oz.	1.09 g/t*	US$816
2012	100,000 oz.	1.64g/t*	US$1,169

Year	Production	Grade	TCC**	AISC***
2013	86,000 oz.	1.34 g/t*	US$1,334	US$1,510
2014	85,000 oz.	1.28 g/t*	US$1,028	US$1,133
2015	69,000 oz.	1.04 g/t*	US$818	US$886
2016	70,000 oz.	1.09 g/t*	US$991	US$1,066
2017	63,000 oz.	0.96 g/t*	US$900	US$1,019
2018	59,000 oz.	0.87 g/t*	US$938	US$990
2019				
2020				

* grams per tonne (g/t) of milled ore

** TCC total cash cost

*** AISC all-in sustainable costs as per the 2013 Word Gold Council's formal guidelines metric
