= Yatela Mine =

Gold mine in Kayes, Mali

Yatela
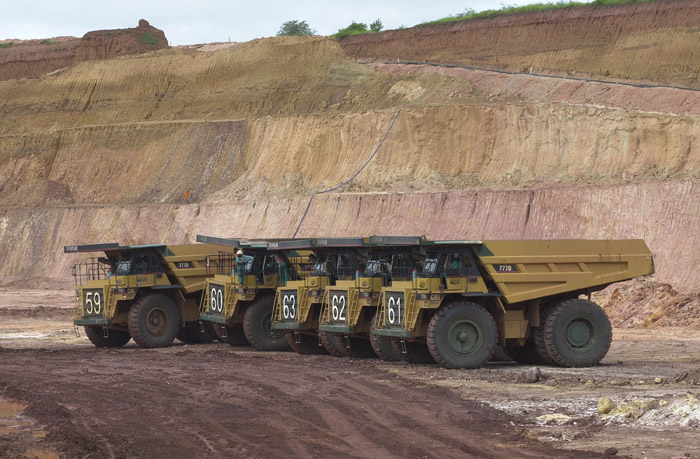

- Location in Mali
- Location: Sadiola, Kayes, Mali; 14°5′N 11°45′W
- Production: 222,000 ounces
- Financial year: 2009
- Opened: 2001
- Company: Government of Mali (100% in 2025)

The Yatela Mine is an open-pit gold mine situated near Yatela, 25 km north of Sadiola, in the Kayes Region of Mali. It is a single-pit operation. Commencing operation in 2001, heap leaching together with carbon-loading was carried out at a rate of approximately 2.9 million tonnes per year. The final step of eluting carbon and smelting the gold in the gold recovery process was completed at the Sadiola Gold Mine.

Apart from Yatela and Sadiola, AngloGold Ashanti's also operated the Morila Gold Mine in Mali. The production of its mines in Mali contributed 8 percent to the company's overall production in 2008.

== Ownership ==
The operation was 80% owned by the Sadiola Exploration Company Limited, a joint venture in which AngloGold Ashanti and IAMGOLD each have an effective holding of 40%. The Government of Mali owned the remaining 20%.

In 2025 the Government of Mali took 100% ownership of the mine.

== History ==
Mining in this region of Mali, according to old workings, dates back at least 1,000 years and written records confirm that small scale mining was carried out there for most of the past 300 years. From 1987 onwards, the government of Mali carried out exploration activities in the area.

In late 1997, IAMGOLD and Anglo American purchased the rights to the mining concession. In 1998 and 1999, a feasibility study was carried out. Anglo American eventually transferred its rights to AngloGold, which, in 2004, became AngloGold Ashanti. Development of the mine begun in 2000 and it opened in 2001. While the mine was owned jointly by AngloGold Ashanti (40%), IAMGOLD (40%), and the Government of Mali (20%), AngloGold Ashanti was the operator of the mine.

In 2009, the mine employed just over 800 people.

In 2025 the mine was taken over by the Government of Mali (full nationalization with 100% ownership transferred to Government of Mali). The Government of Mali planned to revive the mining operations; the mine had seized operations in 2016 after being abandoned by Sadiola Exploration Company (the joint venture of AngloGold Ashanti and IAMGOLD). The financing of the continuation of operations was uncertain at the time.

== Production ==
Production figures of the past were:

Year	Production	Grade	Cost per ounce
2003	218,000 ounces	2.84 g/t	US$ 235
2004	242,000 ounces	3.41 g/t	US$255
2005	246,000 ounces	2.99 g/t	US$263
2006	352,000 ounces	4.12 g/t	US$228
2007	165,000 ounces	3.46 g/t	US$322
2008	301,000 ounces	2.66 g/t	US$572
2009	222,000 ounces	3.62 g/t	US$368
