= Morila Gold Mine =

Gold mine in Sikasso, Mali

Morila
- Location in Mali
- Location: Sanso, Sikasso, Mali; 11°40′44.78″N 6°50′59.38″W
- Production: 342,000 ounces
- Financial year: 2009
- Opened: 2000
- Company: Societe des Mines de Morila SA. (100% and Operator); Government of Mali (100% indirect)

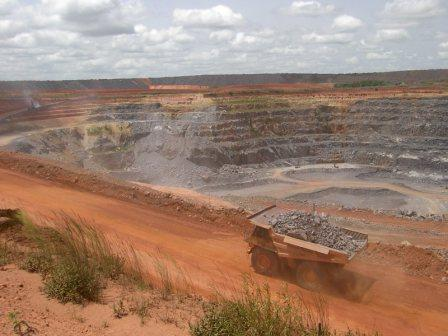
Morila mining site

The Morila Gold Mine (French: Mine d'or de Morila) is an open-pit gold mine situated 180 km south-east of Bamako, near the community of Sanso, in the Sikasso Region of Mali. The Mine is a 100% owned by the Government of Mali through the operating company Societe des Mines de Morila SA.

With production starting in October 2000 Morila became one of West Africa’s most prolific gold mines, yielding over 7.5 million ounces since then and earning the nickname “Morila the Gorilla” for its high-grade output. It was previously operated as a joint venture between AngloGold Ashanti, Randgold (now Barrick Mining Corporation), and the Malian state. After being acquired by Australian company Firefinch in 2020, the mine faced operational challenges and was abandoned in 2022. In June 2025, the Malian government took full control, aiming to revive the site under national ownership despite uncertainties around financing and rehabilitation.

== History ==
The Morila Gold Mine is one of the world's great open pit gold mines, having produced over 7.5Moz of gold and paying more than $2.5 billion to its stakeholders in form of dividends and taxes since operation began in October 2000 at grades that were among the highest in the world, earning it the moniker “Morila the Gorilla”.

=== AngloGold Ashanti & Barrick Gold ===
The first to drill at the Morila deposit was BHP, that sold it to Randgold Resources (Rangold), in 1996. Rangold then discovered the main mining pit in 1997. And thereafter, a joint venture between Rangold (now Barrick Gold) and AngloGoldAshanti was formed in 2000. Both companies held 40% with the rest being owned by the government of Mali.

In 2009 the mine transitioned to a stockpile treatment operation and began processing tailings in 2013 with the plan to close the site in 2021. Despite the mine halted its operations in 2019, ore stockpiles were still processed amounting to 27,000 ounces of gold a year.

=== Acquisition by Firefinch ===
Firefinch acquired Morila for just US$28.9m in November 2020 from Barrick Mining Corporation and AngloGold Ashanti who both held 40% of the mine with the Government of Mali possessing the other 20%. The Australian lithium company then owned 80% of the mine through the joint venture Societe des Mines de Morila with the Government of Mali owning 20% of the company.

Firefinch’s 2021–2030 Life of Mine Plan planned to mine and process 37.5 million tonnes at 1.33g/t, aiming to recover 1.45 million ounces of gold by 2030, with an average annual output of 160,000 ounces. The plan foresaw in 2022 that production will ramp up with mining resuming at the main Morila pit, targeting a 1.49Moz resource. Exploration across 685km² of surrounding tenements was intended to be a major focus, too. In a statement by Barrick Mining, it noted that the acquisition is an opportunity to continue mining at the site despite declining outcome by accessing satellite resources and adapting the infrastructure.

In 2022 the mining site was abandoned by Firefinch citing significant operational issues combined with high costs in the set-up process. Thereafter the company tried to sell the asset, but the Government of Mali blocked the divestment searching for a transfer of ownership to a state-owned company.

=== Takeover by the Government of Mali ===
At the end of June 2025 the Malian government announced the acquisition of the mine for a symbolic dollar after months of negotiations. Preceding a memorandum of understanding signed in May 2024 that paved the way for purchasing Firefinch's shares and to settle outstanding debts. According to Reuters the site among the Yatela Mine will be reviewed by the Society for Research and Exploitation of Mineral Resources of Mali (SEMOS) to assess on how to proceed further. In a statement by the government it said that the mine should be revived without specifying their plans on financing the operations. A 2021 report by Firefinch estimates a reserve of 500,000 ounces of gold in low-grade reserves still minable.

== Geology and Location ==
The Morila Gold Mine is located approximately 11 kilometres south of Sanso village and 175 kilometres west of Sikasso, the capital of the southern region of Mali. The four nearest villages are Morila, Sanso, Fingola and Domba. The pit is accessible via paved roads until 35km of the destination from Bamako which is 270km north-west (180km linear distance) of the mine. It is located within the 211km^2 Morila mining licence that was given out and permitted on the 28th of April 1992 and was granted for 30 years.

In terms of geology, the mine is located in the northern part of the West African craton, between the NNE trending Birimian volcano-sedimentary belts known as Kalana-Yanfolila and Syama. The area mainly consists of those ancient volcanic and sedimentary rocks (called Birimian), along with large zones of granite.

Its orebody is high-grade metamorphic pelites and psammites (upper greenschist to amphibolite facies) that were deformed during the Eburnean orgeny. Their mineralogy is mostly biotite (30%), plgioclase (30%) and quartz (30%). Gold mineralization at Morila is closely associated with sulphide minerals, particularly arsenopyrite, which accounts for approximately 80% of the sulphide content. Lesser amounts of pyrrhotite (15%) and pyrite (5%) are also present. Pyrrhotite is widespread throughout the metasediments and typically occurs as irregular grains that may include chalcopyrite inclusions. Visible gold is not uncommon and may be observed in association with these sulphides.

Mineralization is structurally controlled and primarily occurs within a zone of relatively flat-lying, stacked quartz veins located at depths between 70 and 130 metres below surface. In some areas, the geometry of the orebody is modified by shearing and faulting, resulting in steeper orientations of the mineralized zones.

The Morila Mine currently consists out of four pits, including Morila Pit 5 and three satellite pits, namely Koting, N’Tiola, and Viper.

== Production ==
Production figures of the recent past were:

Year	Production	Grade	Cost per ounce
2003	794,000 ounces	7.56 g/t	US$ 108
2004	510,000 ounces	4.44 g/t	US$184
2005	655,000 ounces	5.41 g/t	US$191
2006	517,000 ounces	3.88 g/t	US$275
2007	450,000 ounces	3.36 g/t	US$350
2008	425,000 ounces	3.08 g/t	US$419
2009	342,000 ounces	2.47 g/t	US$527
2010	278,000 ounces	1.99 g/t	
2011	267,000 ounces	1.83 g/t	
2012	220,000 ounces	1.54 g/t	
2013	162,000 ounces	1.41 g/t	
2014	132,000 ounces	1.27 g/t	
