= Gairo =

Gairo may refer to:

== Burkina Faso ==
- Gairo, Burkina Faso, village in Bougouriba Province, south-western Burkina Faso

== Italy ==
- Gairo, Sardinia, comune on the island of Sardinia, Italy

== Tanzania ==
- Gairo, Tanzania, town in Morogoro Region, central Tanzania
- Gairo Constituency, parliamentary constituency in Morogoro Region, central Tanzania
- Gairo District, administrative district, Morogoro Region, central Tanzania

== See also ==
- Cairo (disambiguation)
