= Dolo =

Dolo may refer to:

== Places ==
- Dolo, Veneto, a town in the province of Venice, northern Italy
- Dolo (river), a river in the Reggio-Emilia province of Italy
- Dolo, Burkina Faso, a town in Burkina Faso
- Dolo, Côtes-d'Armor, a town in France
- Dolo, Ethiopia, a town in Ethiopia
- Dolo, San Jose, a barangay in Camarines Sur, Philippines
- Dolo Department, Bougouriba Province, Burkina Faso

== People ==
- Dolo Coker (1927–1983), American jazz pianist and composer
- Kameng Dolo, Indian politician
- Maphutha Dolo (born 1992), South African rugby union player
- Saye-Taayor Adolphus Dolo (born 1963), Liberian politician and military officer
- Steve Cherundolo (born 1979), nicknamed "Dolo", American association football player

== Other uses ==
- Dolo (automobile)
- Dolo Airport
- Dolo (tablet)

== See also ==
- Dolos, multi-ton concrete blocks
- Dolow, a town in Somalia
- Dulo (disambiguation)
- Dulu (disambiguation)
