= Danko =

Danko may refer to:

- Danko (surname)
- Danko (given name)
- Danko, Nigeria, part of Wasagu/Danko Local Government Area
- Danko Jones, a Canadian hard rock band
- Danko-Tanzou, a village in Burkina Faso
