= Darodine =

- Country: Burkina Faso
- Region: Sud-Ouest Region
- Province: Bougouriba Province
- Department: Bondigui Department

Population (2019)
  - Total: 1,731

Darodine is a town in the Bondigui Department of Bougouriba Province in south-western Burkina Faso.

Population
| Year | Pop. | ±% |
|---|---|---|
| 2006 | 1,380 | — |
| 2019 | 1,731 | +25.4% |
