= Dolindia =

Dolindia Dolinda
- Country: Burkina Faso
- Region: Sud-Ouest Region
- Province: Bougouriba Province
- Department: Dolo Department

Population (2019)
  - Total: 374

Dolindia is a town in the Dolo Department of Bougouriba Province in south-western Burkina Faso.

Population
Year	Pop.	±%
1985	327	—
2006	258	−21.1%
2019	374	+45.0%
