= Djonlèra =

Djonlèra Diomlera
- Country: Burkina Faso
- Region: Sud-Ouest Region
- Province: Bougouriba Province
- Department: Iolonioro Department

Population (2019)
  - Total: 538

Djonlèra is a village in the Iolonioro Department of Bougouriba Province in south-western Burkina Faso.

Population
Year	Pop.	±%
1985	443	—
2006	512	+15.6%
2019	538	+5.1%
