= Dounkora =

- Village
- Interactive map of Dounkora
- Coordinates: 10°38′30″N 3°07′25″W
- Country: Burkina Faso
- Region: Sud-Ouest Region
- Province: Bougouriba Province
- Department: Iolonioro Department

Population (2019)
  - Total: 119

Dounkora is a village in the Iolonioro Department of Bougouriba Province in south-western Burkina Faso.

Population
| Year | Pop. | ±% |
|---|---|---|
| 1985 | 86 | — |
| 2006 | 94 | +9.3% |
| 2019 | 119 | +26.6% |
