= Nabéré =

- Location in Burkina Faso
- Coordinates: 11°3′N 3°31′W
- Country: Burkina Faso
- Region: Sud-Ouest Region
- Province: Bougouriba Province
- Department: Bondigui Department

Population (2019)
  - Total: 1,543

Nabéré is a village in the Bondigui Department of Bougouriba Province in south-western Burkina Faso.

Population
Year	Pop.	±%
1985	109	—
2006	864	+692.7%
2019	1,543	+78.6%
