= Nahirindon =

- Interactive map of Nahirindon
- Country: Burkina Faso
- Region: Sud-Ouest Region
- Province: Bougouriba Province
- Department: Bondigui Department

Population (2019)
  - Total: 3,553

Nahirindon is a town in the Bondigui Department of Bougouriba Province in south-western Burkina Faso.

Population
Year	Pop.	±%
1985	262	—
2006	1,897	+624.0%
2019	3,553	+87.3%
