= Ouidiara =

- Country: Burkina Faso
- Region: Sud-Ouest Region
- Province: Bougouriba Province
- Department: Iolonioro Department

Population (2019)
  - Total: 342

Ouidiara is a village in the Iolonioro Department of Bougouriba Province in south-western Burkina Faso.

Population
| Year | Pop. | ±% |
|---|---|---|
| 1985 | 268 | — |
| 2006 | 228 | −14.9% |
| 2019 | 342 | +50.0% |
