= Diagnon =

- Country: Burkina Faso
- Region: Sud-Ouest Region
- Province: Bougouriba Province
- Department: Dolo Department

Population (2019)
  - Total: 204

Diagnon is a town in the Dolo Department of Bougouriba Province in south-western Burkina Faso.

Population
Year	Pop.	±%
1985	202	—
2006	264	+30.7%
2019	204	−22.7%
