= Nabalé =

- Location in Burkina Faso
- Coordinates: 11°0′N 3°29′W
- Country: Burkina Faso
- Region: Sud-Ouest Region
- Province: Bougouriba Province
- Department: Bondigui Department

Population (2019)
  - Total: 1,372

Nabalé is a village in the Bondigui Department of Bougouriba Province in south-western Burkina Faso.

Population
Year	Pop.	±%
1985	86	—
2006	870	+911.6%
2019	1,372	+57.7%
