= Nicéo =

- Country: Burkina Faso
- Region: Sud-Ouest Region
- Province: Bougouriba Province
- Department: Dolo Department

Population (2019)
  - Total: 2,149

Nicéo is a village in the Dolo Department of Bougouriba Province in south western Burkina Faso.

Population
Year	Pop.	±%
1985	1,634	—
2006	1,539	−5.8%
2019	2,149	+39.6%
