= Niombouna =

- Country: Burkina Faso
- Region: Sud-Ouest Region
- Province: Bougouriba Province
- Department: Iolonioro Department

Population (2019)
  - Total: 259

Niombouna is a village in the Iolonioro Department of Bougouriba Province in south-western Burkina Faso.

Population
Year	Pop.	±%
1985	205	—
2006	274	+33.7%
2019	259	−5.5%
