= Bombara =

- Location in Burkina Faso
- Coordinates: 10°47′N 3°17′W
- Country: Burkina Faso
- Region: Sud-Ouest Region
- Province: Bougouriba Province
- Department: Tiankoura Department

Population (2019)
  - Total: 998

Bombara is a village in the Tiankoura Department of Bougouriba Province in south-western Burkina Faso.

Population
Year	Pop.	±%
1985	855	—
2006	892	+4.3%
2019	998	+11.9%
