= Nouvielgane =

- Country: Burkina Faso
- Region: Sud-Ouest Region
- Province: Bougouriba Province
- Department: Dolo Department

Population (2019)
  - Total: 217

Nouvielgane is a village in the Dolo Department of Bougouriba Province in south western Burkina Faso.

Population
Year	Pop.	±%
2006	145	—
2019	217	+49.7%
