= Sehintiro =

Sehintiro Semintiro
- Country: Burkina Faso
- Region: Sud-Ouest Region
- Province: Bougouriba Province
- Department: Tiankoura Department

Population (2019)
  - Total: 530

Sehintiro is a village in the Tiankoura Department of Bougouriba Province in south-western Burkina Faso.

Population
Year	Pop.	±%
1985	337	—
2006	493	+46.3%
2019	530	+7.5%
