= Gomgombiro =

Gomgombiro Gongombiro
- Country: Burkina Faso
- Region: Sud-Ouest Region
- Province: Bougouriba Province
- Department: Iolonioro Department

Population (2019)
  - Total: 542

Gomgombiro is a village in the Iolonioro Department of Bougouriba Province in south-western Burkina Faso.

Population
Year	Pop.	±%
1985	251	—
2006	300	+19.5%
2019	542	+80.7%
