= Gongoura =

Gongoura Gougoura
- Country: Burkina Faso
- Region: Sud-Ouest Region
- Province: Bougouriba Province
- Department: Tiankoura Department

Population (2019)
  - Total: 246

Gongoura is a village in the Tiankoura Department of Bougouriba Province in south-western Burkina Faso.

Population
Year	Pop.	±%
1985	121	—
2006	243	+100.8%
2019	246	+1.2%
