= Milpo =

Coordinates: 10°56′N 3°24′W

- Interactive map of Milpo
- Country: Burkina Faso
- Region: Sud-Ouest Region
- Province: Bougouriba Province
- Department: Iolonioro Department

Population (2019)
  - Total: 345

Milpo is a village in the Iolonioro Department of Bougouriba Province in south-western Burkina Faso.

Population
Year	Pop.	±%
1985	251	—
2006	294	+17.1%
2019	345	+17.3%
