= Pergdalembiro =

Pergdalembiro Pergbalembiro
- Country: Burkina Faso
- Region: Sud-Ouest Region
- Province: Bougouriba Province
- Department: Iolonioro Department

Population (2019)
  - Total: 240

Pergdalembiro is a village in the Iolonioro Department of Bougouriba Province in south-western Burkina Faso.

Population
Year	Pop.	±%
1985	143	—
2006	222	+55.2%
2019	240	+8.1%
