= Naborgane =

- Location in Burkina Faso
- Coordinates: 11°0′N 3°22′W
- Country: Burkina Faso
- Region: Sud-Ouest Region
- Province: Bougouriba Province
- Department: Diébougou Department

Population (2019)
  - Total: 1,356

Naborgane is a village in the Diébougou Department of Bougouriba Province in south-western Burkina Faso.

Population
Year	Pop.	±%
1985	427	—
2006	1,297	+203.7%
2019	1,356	+4.5%
