= Lokodja =

Lokodja Lokodia
- Country: Burkina Faso
- Region: Sud-Ouest Region
- Province: Bougouriba Province
- Department: Diébougou Department

Population (2019)
  - Total: 1,324

Lokodja is a village in the Diébougou Department of Bougouriba Province in south-western Burkina Faso.

Population
Year	Pop.	±%
1985	951	—
2006	1,120	+17.8%
2019	1,324	+18.2%
