= Nkinora =

Nkinora N'Kinao
- Country: Burkina Faso
- Region: Sud-Ouest Region
- Province: Bougouriba Province
- Department: Tiankoura Department

Population (2019)
  - Total: 162

Nkinora is a village in the Tiankoura Department of Bougouriba Province in south-western Burkina Faso.

Population
Year	Pop.	±%
1985	192	—
2006	154	−19.8%
2019	162	+5.2%
