= Guimbissenao =

Guimbissenao Gnimbissea
- Country: Burkina Faso
- Region: Sud-Ouest Region
- Province: Bougouriba Province
- Department: Tiankoura Department

Population (2019)
  - Total: 476

Guimbissenao is a village in the Tiankoura Department of Bougouriba Province in south-western Burkina Faso.

Population
Year	Pop.	±%
1985	302	—
2006	477	+57.9%
2019	476	−0.2%
