= Tordiera =

Tordiera Tordiero
- Country: Burkina Faso
- Region: Sud-Ouest Region
- Province: Bougouriba Province
- Department: Tiankoura Department

Population (2019)
  - Total: 144

Tordiera is a village in the Tiankoura Department of Bougouriba Province in south-western Burkina Faso.

Population
Year	Pop.	±%
1985	183	—
2006	182	−0.5%
2019	144	−20.9%
