= Sinamanana =

Sinamanana Sinamanano
- Country: Burkina Faso
- Region: Sud-Ouest Region
- Province: Bougouriba Province
- Department: Iolonioro Department

Population (2019)
  - Total: 146

Sinamanana is a village in the Iolonioro Department of Bougouriba Province in south-western Burkina Faso.

Population
Year	Pop.	±%
1985	151	—
2006	116	−23.2%
2019	146	+25.9%
