= Sangolo =

Coordinates: 10°46′N 3°28′W

- Interactive map of Sangolo
- Country: Burkina Faso
- Region: Sud-Ouest Region
- Province: Bougouriba Province
- Department: Iolonioro Department

Population (2019)
  - Total: 809

Sangolo is a village in the Iolonioro Department of Bougouriba Province in south-western Burkina Faso.

Population
Year	Pop.	±%
1985	345	—
2006	472	+36.8%
2019	809	+71.4%
