= Yèbèlèla =

- Location in Burkina Faso
- Coordinates: 10°44′N 3°13′W
- Country: Burkina Faso
- Region: Sud-Ouest Region
- Province: Bougouriba Province
- Department: Tiankoura Department

Population (2019)
  - Total: 259

Yèbèlèla is a village in the Tiankoura Department of Bougouriba Province in south-western Burkina Faso.

Population
Year	Pop.	±%
1985	275	—
2006	197	−28.4%
2019	259	+31.5%
