= Soussoubro =

- Country: Burkina Faso
- Region: Sud-Ouest Region
- Province: Bougouriba Province
- Department: Dolo Department

Population (2019)
  - Total: 277

Soussoubro is a village in the Dolo Department of Bougouriba Province in south western Burkina Faso.

Population
Year	Pop.	±%
1985	210	—
2006	232	+10.5%
2019	277	+19.4%
