= Sinkiro =

- Location in Burkina Faso
- Coordinates: 10°45′N 3°10′W
- Country: Burkina Faso
- Region: Sud-Ouest Region
- Province: Bougouriba Province
- Department: Tiankoura Department

Population (2019)
  - Total: 425

Sinkiro is a village in the Tiankoura Department of Bougouriba Province in south-western Burkina Faso.

Population
Year	Pop.	±%
1985	158	—
2006	208	+31.6%
2019	425	+104.3%
