= Diarkadougou =

- Location in Burkina Faso
- Coordinates: 10°54′N 3°34′W
- Country: Burkina Faso
- Region: Sud-Ouest Region
- Province: Bougouriba Province
- Department: Bondigui Department

Population (2019)
  - Total: 2,414

Diarkadougou is a village in the Bondigui Department of Bougouriba Province in south-western Burkina Faso.

Population
Year	Pop.	±%
1985	438	—
2006	788	+79.9%
2019	2,414	+206.3%
