= Milkpo =

- Country: Burkina Faso
- Region: Sud-Ouest Region
- Province: Bougouriba Province
- Department: Dolo Department

Population (2019)
  - Total: 1,041

Milkpo is a village in the Dolo Department of Bougouriba Province in south-western Burkina Faso.

Population
Year	Pop.	±%
1985	526	—
2006	706	+34.2%
2019	1,041	+47.5%
