= Diassara =

Coordinates: 10°41′N 3°34′W

- Interactive map of Diassara
- Country: Burkina Faso
- Region: Sud-Ouest Region
- Province: Bougouriba Province
- Department: Iolonioro Department

Population (2019)
  - Total: 6,102

Diassara is a town in the Iolonioro Department of Bougouriba Province in south-western Burkina Faso.

Population
Year	Pop.	±%
1985	422	—
2006	2,882	+582.9%
2019	6,102	+111.7%
