= Intiédougou =

Coordinates: 11°07′N 3°31′W

- Interactive map of Intiédougou
- Country: Burkina Faso
- Region: Sud-Ouest Region
- Province: Bougouriba Province
- Department: Bondigui Department

Population (2019)
  - Total: 2,946

Intiédougou is a town in the Bondigui Department of Bougouriba Province in south-western Burkina Faso.

Population
Year	Pop.	±%
1985	221	—
2006	1,511	+583.7%
2019	2,946	+95.0%
