= Olbontouné =

- Country: Burkina Faso
- Region: Sud-Ouest Region
- Province: Bougouriba Province
- Department: Dolo Department

Population (2019)
  - Total: 636

Olbontouné is a village in the Dolo Department of Bougouriba Province in south western Burkina Faso.

Population
Year	Pop.	±%
1985	642	—
2006	312	−51.4%
2019	636	+103.8%
