= Segré, Burkina Faso =

Segré
- Country: Burkina Faso
- Region: Sud-Ouest Region
- Province: Bougouriba Province
- Department: Diébougou Department

Population (2019)
  - Total: 1,062

Segré is a village in the Diébougou Department of Bougouriba Province in south-western Burkina Faso.

Population
Year	Pop.	±%
1985	423	—
2006	589	+39.2%
2019	1,062	+80.3%
