= Burkinao =

Burkinao Birkinao
- Country: Burkina Faso
- Region: Sud-Ouest Region
- Province: Bougouriba Province
- Department: Iolonioro Department

Population (2019)
  - Total: 316

Burkinao is a village in the Iolonioro Department of Bougouriba Province in south-western Burkina Faso.

Population
Year	Pop.	±%
1985	207	—
2006	415	+100.5%
2019	316	−23.9%
