= Bapla-Birifor =

- Location in Burkina Faso
- Coordinates: 10.8572°N 3.2628°W
- Country: Burkina Faso
- Region: Sud-Ouest Region
- Province: Bougouriba Province
- Department: Diébougou Department

Population (2019)
  - Total: 1,571

Bapla-Birifor is a town in the Diébougou Department of Bougouriba Province in south-western Burkina Faso.

Population
Year	Pop.	±%
1985	1,968	—
2006	2,144	+8.9%
2019	1,571	−26.7%
