= Kobogo =

Kobogo Koubogo
- Country: Burkina Faso
- Region: Sud-Ouest Region
- Province: Bougouriba Province
- Department: Bondigui Department

Population (2019)
  - Total: 790

Kobogo is a village in the Bondigui Department of Bougouriba Province in south-western Burkina Faso.

Population
Year	Pop.	±%
1985	232	—
2006	210	−9.5%
2019	790	+276.2%
