= Loukoura =

- Location in Burkina Faso
- Coordinates: 10°45′N 3°24′W
- Country: Burkina Faso
- Region: Sud-Ouest Region
- Province: Bougouriba Province
- Department: Iolonioro Department

Population (2019)
  - Total: 1,377

Loukoura is a village in the Iolonioro Department of Bougouriba Province in south-western Burkina Faso.

Population
Year	Pop.	±%
1985	849	—
2006	986	+16.1%
2019	1,377	+39.7%
