= Kolepar =

- Country: Burkina Faso
- Region: Sud-Ouest Region
- Province: Bougouriba Province
- Department: Diébougou Department

Population (2019)
  - Total: 630

Kolepar is a village in the Diébougou Department of Bougouriba Province in south-western Burkina Faso.

Population
| Year | Pop. | ±% |
|---|---|---|
| 1985 | 718 | — |
| 2006 | 348 | −51.5% |
| 2019 | 630 | +81.0% |
