= Gbingue =

- Location in Burkina Faso
- Coordinates: 10°43′N 3°43′W
- Country: Burkina Faso
- Region: Sud-Ouest Region
- Province: Bougouriba Province
- Department: Iolonioro Department
- Elevation: 298 m (978 ft)

Population (2019)
  - Total: 5,015

Gbingue is a town in the Iolonioro Department of Bougouriba Province in south-western Burkina Faso.

Population
Year	Pop.	±%
1985	155	—
2006	2,847	+1736.8%
2019	5,015	+76.2%
