= Mebar =

Coordinates: 10°16′N 2°52′W

- Interactive map of Mebar
- Country: Burkina Faso
- Region: Sud-Ouest Region
- Province: Bougouriba Province
- Department: Diébougou Department

Population (2019)
  - Total: 1,155

Mebar is a village in the Diébougou Department of Bougouriba Province in south-western Burkina Faso.

Population
Year	Pop.	±%
1985	767	—
2006	907	+18.3%
2019	1,155	+27.3%
