= Bèkoro =

- Country: Burkina Faso
- Region: Sud-Ouest Region
- Province: Bougouriba Province
- Department: Dolo Department

Population (2019)
  - Total: 480

Bèkoro is a town in the Dolo Department of Bougouriba Province in south-western Burkina Faso.

Population
Year	Pop.	±%
1985	402	—
2006	457	+13.7%
2019	480	+5.0%
