= Obro =

- Country: Burkina Faso
- Region: Sud-Ouest Region
- Province: Bougouriba Province
- Department: Bondigui Department

Population (2019)
  - Total: 887

Obro is a village in the Bondigui Department of Bougouriba Province in south-western Burkina Faso.

Population
Year	Pop.	±%
1985	363	—
2006	641	+76.6%
2019	887	+38.4%
