= Boussoukoula (department) =

- Department
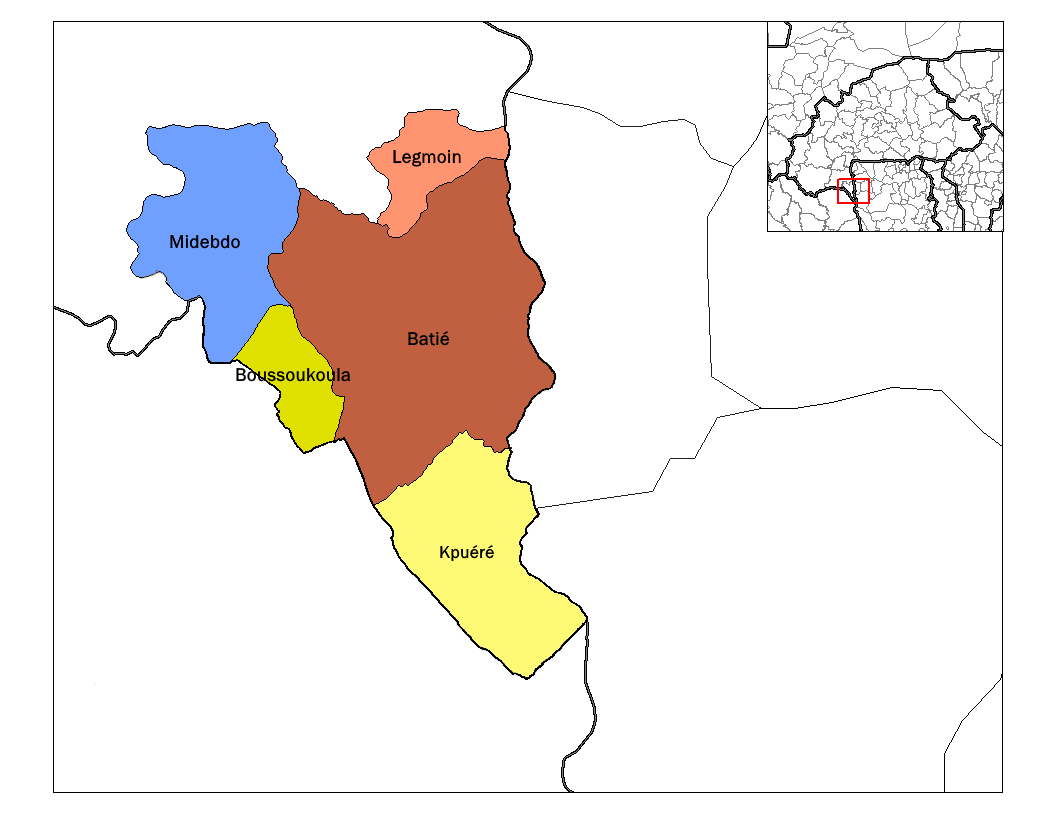
- Boussoukoula Department location in the province
- Country: Burkina Faso
- Region: Sud-Ouest Region (Burkina Faso)
- Province: Noumbiel Province

Population (2019)
  - Total: 12,620
- Time zone: UTC+0 (GMT 0)

Boussoukoula is a department or commune of Noumbiel Province in Burkina Faso.
