= Voukoun =

- Country: Burkina Faso
- Region: Sud-Ouest Region
- Province: Bougouriba Province
- Department: Diébougou Department

Population (2019)
  - Total: 647

Voukoun is a village in the Diébougou Department of Bougouriba Province in south-western Burkina Faso.

Population
| Year | Pop. | ±% |
|---|---|---|
| 1985 | 663 | — |
| 2006 | 844 | +27.3% |
| 2019 | 647 | −23.3% |
