= Kankoura =

- Country: Burkina Faso
- Region: Sud-Ouest Region
- Province: Bougouriba Province
- Department: Tiankoura Department

Population (2019)
  - Total: 346

Kankoura, Bigel Kankoura, or Biguel Kankoura is a village in the Tiankoura Department of Bougouriba Province in south-western Burkina Faso.

== Geography ==
Kankoura has a latitude of 13° 48' 51" N and a longitude of 5° 42' 34" E. Its climate is hot semi-arid. The estimated terrain is 221 meters above sea level.

Population
Year	Pop.	±%
1985	331	—
2006	368	+11.2%
2019	346	−6.0%
