= Tampé =

- Location in Burkina Faso
- Coordinates: 10°58′N 3°21′W
- Country: Burkina Faso
- Region: Sud-Ouest Region
- Province: Bougouriba Province
- Department: Diébougou Department

Population (2019)
  - Total: 1,535

Tampé is a village in the Diébougou Department of Bougouriba Province in south-western Burkina Faso.

Population
Year	Pop.	±%
1985	503	—
2006	960	+90.9%
2019	1,535	+59.9%
