= Mouvielo =

Mouvielo Mouviello
- Country: Burkina Faso
- Region: Sud-Ouest Region
- Province: Bougouriba Province
- Department: Diébougou Department

Population (2019)
  - Total: 2,271

Mouvielo is a town in the Diébougou Department of Bougouriba Province in south-western Burkina Faso.

Population
Year	Pop.	±%
1985	449	—
2006	1,835	+308.7%
2019	2,271	+23.8%
