= Kolonkoura =

Kolonkoura Koronkoura
- Country: Burkina Faso
- Region: Sud-Ouest Region
- Province: Bougouriba Province
- Department: Tiankoura Department

Population (2019)
  - Total: 210

Kolonkoura is a village in the Tiankoura Department of Bougouriba Province in south-western Burkina Faso.

Population
Year	Pop.	±%
1985	184	—
2006	189	+2.7%
2019	210	+11.1%
