= Binte, Burkina Faso =

Coordinates: 10°45′N 3°36′W

Binte
- Interactive map of Binte
- Country: Burkina Faso
- Region: Sud-Ouest Region
- Province: Bougouriba Province
- Department: Iolonioro Department

Population (2019)
  - Total: 843

Binte is a village in the Iolonioro Department of Bougouriba Province in south-western Burkina Faso.

Population
Year	Pop.	±%
1985	146	—
2006	439	+200.7%
2019	843	+92.0%
