= Waltièra =

Waltièra Walkiero
- Country: Burkina Faso
- Region: Sud-Ouest Region
- Province: Bougouriba Province
- Department: Tiankoura Department

Population (2019)
  - Total: 202

Waltièra is a village in the Tiankoura Department of Bougouriba Province in south-western Burkina Faso.

Population
Year	Pop.	±%
1985	121	—
2006	137	+13.2%
2019	202	+47.4%
