= Doumbouro =

Doumbouro Dombouro
- Country: Burkina Faso
- Region: Sud-Ouest Region
- Province: Bougouriba Province
- Department: Iolonioro Department

Population (2019)
  - Total: 333

Doumbouro is a village in the Iolonioro Department of Bougouriba Province in south-western Burkina Faso.

Population
Year	Pop.	±%
1985	173	—
2006	259	+49.7%
2019	333	+28.6%
