= Tinkiro-Lobi =

- Country: Burkina Faso
- Region: Sud-Ouest Region
- Province: Bougouriba Province
- Department: Dolo Department

Population (2019)
  - Total: 125

Tinkiro-Lobi is a village in the Dolo Department of Bougouriba Province in south western Burkina Faso.

Population
Year	Pop.	±%
1985	108	—
2006	163	+50.9%
2019	125	−23.3%
