= Tiedia =

- Interactive map of Tiedia
- Country: Burkina Faso
- Region: Sud-Ouest Region
- Province: Bougouriba Province
- Department: Diébougou Department

Population (2019)
  - Total: 413

Tiedia is a village in the Diébougou Department of Bougouriba Province in south-western Burkina Faso.

Population
| Year | Pop. | ±% |
|---|---|---|
| 1985 | 196 | — |
| 2006 | 332 | +69.4% |
| 2019 | 413 | +24.4% |
