= Kpolo =

- Country: Burkina Faso
- Region: Sud-Ouest Region
- Province: Bougouriba Province
- Department: Tiankoura Department

Population (2019)
  - Total: 588

Kpolo is a village in the Tiankoura Department of Bougouriba Province in south-western Burkina Faso.

Population
| Year | Pop. | ±% |
|---|---|---|
| 1985 | 463 | — |
| 2006 | 549 | +18.6% |
| 2019 | 588 | +7.1% |
