= Hebrimpono =

Hebrimpono Heberimpono
- Country: Burkina Faso
- Region: Sud-Ouest Region
- Province: Bougouriba Province
- Department: Iolonioro Department

Population (2019)
  - Total: 275

Hebrimpono is a village in the Iolonioro Department of Bougouriba Province in south-western Burkina Faso.

Population
Year	Pop.	±%
1985	293	—
2006	245	−16.4%
2019	275	+12.2%
