= Batié =

Batié may refer to:

- Batié, Burkina Faso
- Batié, Cameroon
- Batié department, Burkina Faso

== See also ==
- China–Pakistan relations, colloquially referred to as Bātiě (Chinese: 巴铁; lit. 'Ironclad Pakistan')
