= Kanseo =

- Country: Burkina Faso
- Region: Sud-Ouest Region
- Province: Bougouriba Province
- Department: Tiankoura Department

Population (2019)
  - Total: 378

Kanseo is a village in the Tiankoura Department of Bougouriba Province in south-western Burkina Faso.

Population
| Year | Pop. | ±% |
|---|---|---|
| 1985 | 256 | — |
| 2006 | 296 | +15.6% |
| 2019 | 378 | +27.7% |
