= Balambiro =

Balambiro Balembiro
- Country: Burkina Faso
- Region: Sud-Ouest Region
- Province: Bougouriba Province
- Department: Tiankoura Department

Population (2019)
  - Total: 121

Balambiro is a village in the Tiankoura Department of Bougouriba Province in south-western Burkina Faso.

Population
Year	Pop.	±%
1985	81	—
2006	131	+61.7%
2019	121	−7.6%
