= Tomena =

Coordinates: 10°46′N 3°31′W

Tomena Tomema
- Interactive map of Tomena
- Country: Burkina Faso
- Region: Sud-Ouest Region
- Province: Bougouriba Province
- Department: Iolonioro Department

Population (2019)
  - Total: 1,257

Tomena is a village in the Iolonioro Department of Bougouriba Province in south-western Burkina Faso.

Population
Year	Pop.	±%
1985	110	—
2006	910	+727.3%
2019	1,257	+38.1%
