= Tansié =

Tansié Tanzie
- Location in Burkina Faso
- Country: Burkina Faso
- Region: Sud-Ouest Region
- Province: Bougouriba Province
- Department: Diébougou Department

Population (2019)
  - Total: 2,323

Tansié is a town in the Diébougou Department of Bougouriba Province in south-western Burkina Faso.

Population
Year	Pop.	±%
1985	1,525	—
2006	1,412	−7.4%
2019	2,323	+64.5%
