= Bamako (disambiguation) =

Bamako is the capital of Mali.

It could also refer to:

== Places ==
- Bamako, Bougouriba, a village in Burkina Faso
- Bamako, Comoé, a village in Burkina Faso

== Others ==
- Bamako Convention, an African treaty prohibiting the importation of hazardous waste
- Bamako Initiative, a formal statement adopted by African health ministers in 1987 in Bamako, Mali
- Bamako (film) is a 2006 film directed by Abderrahmane Sissako
- Bamako (album), a 2019 album by the OGJB Quartet
- Bamako, a 2020 album by Simphiwe Dana

== See also ==
- Bomako, a village in Donga Department, Benin
- Budapest-Bamako or Great African Run, a charity car race in Africa, and the largest amateur rally in the world
- Bamako Sign Language, also known as Malian Sign Language
