= Kimpeo =

- Location in Burkina Faso
- Coordinates: 10°43′N 3°12′W
- Country: Burkina Faso
- Region: Sud-Ouest Region
- Province: Bougouriba Province
- Department: Tiankoura Department

Population (2019)
  - Total: 179

Kimpeo is a village in the Tiankoura Department of Bougouriba Province in south-western Burkina Faso.

Population
Year	Pop.	±%
1985	125	—
2006	127	+1.6%
2019	179	+40.9%
