= Sounkpourouna =

Sounkpourouna Sounkpourouno
- Country: Burkina Faso
- Region: Sud-Ouest Region
- Province: Bougouriba Province
- Department: Tiankoura Department

Population (2019)
  - Total: 217

Sounkpourouna is a village in the Tiankoura Department of Bougouriba Province in south-western Burkina Faso.

Population
Year	Pop.	±%
1985	287	—
2006	245	−14.6%
2019	217	−11.4%
