= Sorgon =

- Country: Burkina Faso
- Region: Sud-Ouest Region
- Province: Bougouriba Province
- Department: Diébougou Department

Population (2019)
  - Total: 232

Sorgon is a village in the Diébougou Department of Bougouriba Province in south-western Burkina Faso.

Population
Year	Pop.	±%
1985	129	—
2006	276	+114.0%
2019	232	−15.9%
