= Diebiro =

- Country: Burkina Faso
- Region: Sud-Ouest Region
- Province: Bougouriba Province
- Department: Tiankoura Department

Population (2019)
  - Total: 578

Diebiro is a village in the Tiankoura Department of Bougouriba Province in south-western Burkina Faso.

Population
Year	Pop.	±%
1985	482	—
2006	531	+10.2%
2019	578	+8.9%
