= Wan =

WAN or Wan may refer to:

== Language ==
- Wan language of the Ivory Coast
- 万/萬 (Pinyin: Wàn), 10,000 in Chinese

== People ==
- Wan (surname) (万 and 萬), a Chinese surname
- Wan (surname 溫), an alternative spelling for the Chinese surname Wen (溫)
- Wan Wan (彎彎; born 1981) Taiwanese artist and actress
- Wan (khan), Jurchen chieftain
- Wan, female Malay styles and titles

== Places ==
=== Asia ===
- Anhui, abbreviated Wǎn (皖), province of China
- Nanyang, Henan, abbreviated Wǎn (宛), a city in China
- Van, Turkey (Kurdish: Wan)
- Wan, Pakistan, a village in Sialkot District, Punjab, Pakistan
- Wan Man, an island in Terengganu, Malaysia

=== Elsewhere ===
- Wallan railway station, Australia
- Wan, Burkina Faso, a town in Burkina Faso
- Wanborough railway station, Surrey, England (GB station code: WAN)

== Other uses ==
- TVWan, a digital television network in Papua New Guinea
- Wataniya Airways, a former Kuwaiti airline, ICAO designator
- Wide area network, computer network
- WAN-IFRA, World Association of Newspapers
- Wan, a character in the novel The Boy Who Would Live Forever
- Wan, an AI video generation model by Alibaba

== See also ==
- Wans (disambiguation)
