= Moulé =

- Location in Burkina Faso
- Coordinates: 10°59′N 3°18′W
- Country: Burkina Faso
- Region: Sud-Ouest Region
- Province: Bougouriba Province
- Department: Diébougou Department

Population (2019)
  - Total: 204

Moulé is a village in the Diébougou Department of Bougouriba Province in south-western Burkina Faso.

Population
Year	Pop.	±%
1985	147	—
2006	198	+34.7%
2019	204	+3.0%
