= Sarambour =

- Country: Burkina Faso
- Region: Sud-Ouest Region
- Province: Bougouriba Province
- Department: Iolonioro Department

Population (2019)
  - Total: 448

Sarambour is a village in the Iolonioro Department of Bougouriba Province in south-western Burkina Faso.

Population
Year	Pop.	±%
1985	233	—
2006	193	−17.2%
2019	448	+132.1%
