= Barkoura =

Coordinates: 10°23′N 3°21′W

- Interactive map of Barkoura
- Country: Burkina Faso
- Region: Sud-Ouest Region
- Province: Bougouriba Province
- Department: Iolonioro Department

Population (2019)
  - Total: 333

Barkoura is a village in the Iolonioro Department of Bougouriba Province in south-western Burkina Faso.

Population
Year	Pop.	±%
1985	255	—
2006	205	−19.6%
2019	333	+62.4%
