= Konsabla =

- Country: Burkina Faso
- Region: Sud-Ouest Region
- Province: Bougouriba Province
- Department: Diébougou Department

Population (2019)
  - Total: 1,644

Konsabla is a village in the Diébougou Department of Bougouriba Province in south-western Burkina Faso.

Population
Year	Pop.	±%
1985	1,171	—
2006	2,599	+121.9%
2019	1,644	−36.7%
