= Kourou, Burkina Faso =

Kourou
- Location in Burkina Faso
- Coordinates: 10°38′44″N 3°13′49″W
- Country: Burkina Faso
- Region: Sud-Ouest Region
- Province: Bougouriba Province
- Department: Tiankoura Department

Population (2019)
  - Total: 618

Kourou is a village in the Tiankoura Department of Bougouriba Province in south-western Burkina Faso.

Population
| Year | Pop. | ±% |
|---|---|---|
| 1985 | 400 | — |
| 2006 | 482 | +20.5% |
| 2019 | 618 | +28.2% |
