= Goumpologo =

- Location in Burkina Faso
- Coordinates: 10°51′20″N 3°21′50″W
- Country: Burkina Faso
- Region: Sud-Ouest Region
- Province: Bougouriba Province
- Department: Dolo Department

Population (2019)
  - Total: 281

Goumpologo is a town in the Dolo Department of Bougouriba Province in south-western Burkina Faso.

Population
Year	Pop.	±%
1985	396	—
2006	300	−24.2%
2019	281	−6.3%
