= Diourao =

- Location in Burkina Faso
- Coordinates: 10°42′N 3°10′W
- Country: Burkina Faso
- Region: Sud-Ouest Region
- Province: Bougouriba Province
- Department: Tiankoura Department

Population (2019)
  - Total: 565

Diourao is a village in the Tiankoura Department of Bougouriba Province in south-western Burkina Faso.

Population
Year	Pop.	±%
1985	445	—
2006	556	+24.9%
2019	565	+1.6%
