= Koursera =

Koursera Koussera
- Country: Burkina Faso
- Region: Sud-Ouest Region
- Province: Bougouriba Province
- Department: Iolonioro Department

Population (2019)
  - Total: 1,942

Koursera is a village in the Iolonioro Department of Bougouriba Province in south-western Burkina Faso.

Population
| Year | Pop. | ±% |
|---|---|---|
| 1985 | 324 | — |
| 2006 | 475 | +46.6% |
| 2019 | 1,942 | +308.8% |
