= Sidoumoukar =

Coordinates: 10°21′N 3°14′W

- Interactive map of Sidoumoukar
- Country: Burkina Faso
- Region: Sud-Ouest Region
- Province: Bougouriba Province
- Department: Iolonioro Department

Population (2019)
  - Total: 293

Sidoumoukar is a village in the Iolonioro Department of Bougouriba Province in south-western Burkina Faso.

Population
Year	Pop.	±%
1985	312	—
2006	239	−23.4%
2019	293	+22.6%
