= Zanawa-Pougouli =

- Country: Burkina Faso
- Region: Sud-Ouest Region
- Province: Bougouriba Province
- Department: Bondigui Department

Population (2019)
  - Total: 2,066

Zanawa-Pougouli is a town in the Bondigui Department of Bougouriba Province in south-western Burkina Faso.

Population
Year	Pop.	±%
1985	461	—
2006	1,869	+305.4%
2019	2,066	+10.5%
