= Poyo =

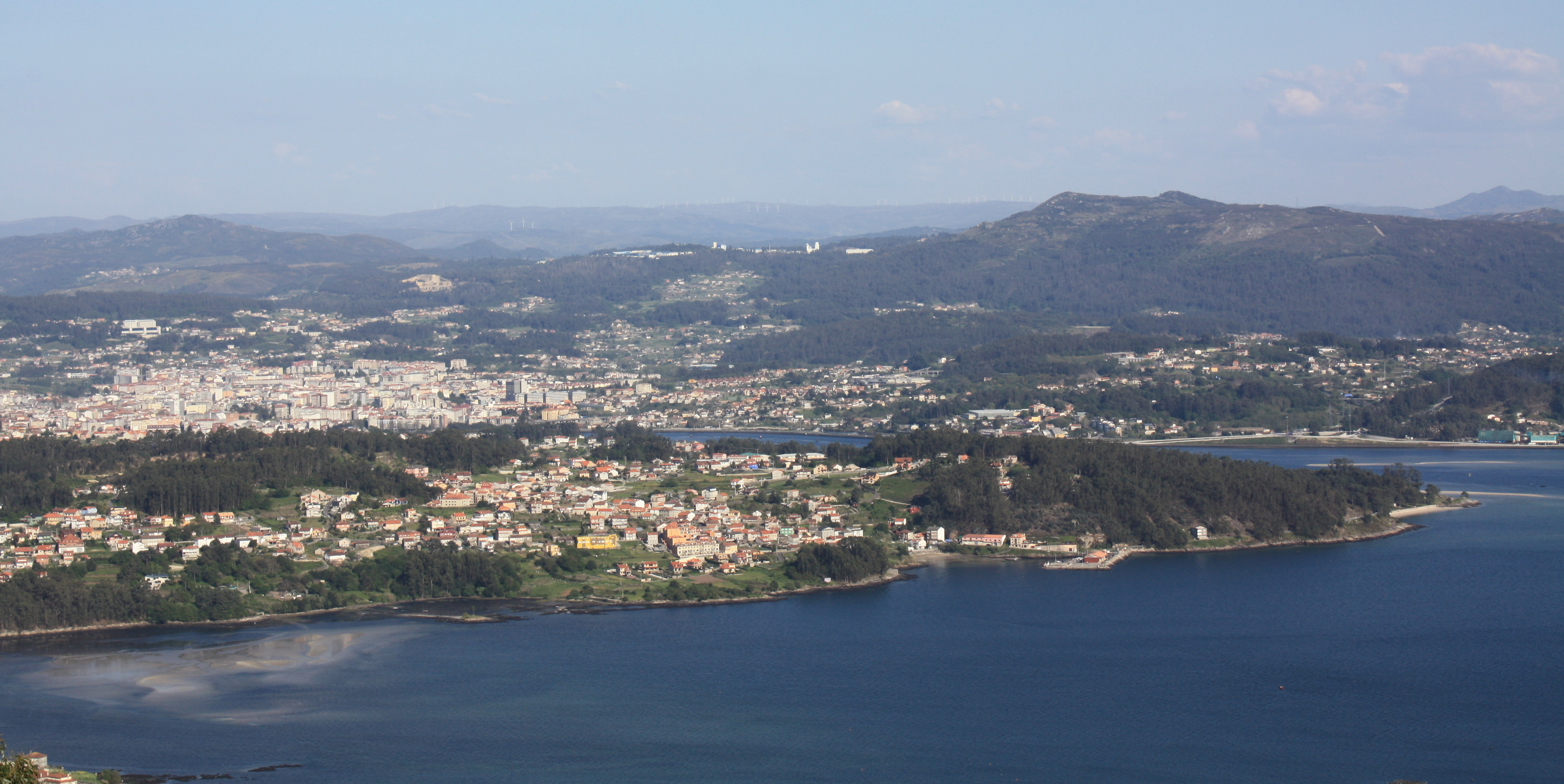
- View of Poyo
- Country: Burkina Faso
- Region: Sud-Ouest Region
- Province: Bougouriba Province
- Department: Iolonioro Department

Population (2019)
  - Total: 1,481

Poyo is a small village in Burkina Faso. It forms part of the Iolonioro Department in the Bougouriba Province.

Population
Year	Pop.	±%
1985	188	—
2006	950	+405.3%
2019	1,481	+55.9%
