= Nonkuéro =

Nonkuéro Nonkouero
- Country: Burkina Faso
- Region: Sud-Ouest Region
- Province: Bougouriba Province
- Department: Iolonioro Department

Population (2019)
  - Total: 115

Nonkuéro is a small village in the Iolonioro Department of Bougouriba Province in south-western Burkina Faso.

Population
Year	Pop.	±%
1985	131	—
2006	80	−38.9%
2019	115	+43.8%
