= N'tonhiro =

Village in Burkina Faso

N’tonhiro
- Location in Burkina Faso
- Coordinates: 10°46′N 3°19′W
- Country: Burkina Faso
- Region: Sud-Ouest Region
- Province: Bougouriba Province
- Department: Tiankoura Department

Population (2019)
  - Total: 150

N’tonhiro is a village in the Tiankoura Department of Bougouriba Province in south-western Burkina Faso.

Population
Year	Pop.	±%
2006	70	—
2019	150	+114.3%
