= Saramboura =

- Country: Burkina Faso
- Region: Sud-Ouest Region
- Province: Bougouriba Province
- Department: Iolonioro Department

Population (2019)
  - Total: 1,111

Saramboura is a village in the Iolonioro Department of Bougouriba Province in south-western Burkina Faso.

Population
Year	Pop.	±%
1985	312	—
2006	608	+94.9%
2019	1,111	+82.7%
