= Navielgane =

- Location in Burkina Faso
- Country: Burkina Faso
- Region: Sud-Ouest Region
- Province: Bougouriba Province
- Department: Diébougou Department

Population (2019)
  - Total: 3,315

Navielgane is a town in the Diébougou Department of Bougouriba Province in south-western Burkina Faso.

Population
Year	Pop.	±%
1985	2,462	—
2006	1,625	−34.0%
2019	3,315	+104.0%
