= Mougué =

- Location in Burkina Faso
- Coordinates: 10°59′N 3°34′W
- Country: Burkina Faso
- Region: Sud-Ouest Region
- Province: Bougouriba Province
- Department: Bondigui Department

Population (2019)
  - Total: 2,320

Mougué is a town in the Bondigui Department of Bougouriba Province in south-western Burkina Faso.

Population
Year	Pop.	±%
1985	316	—
2006	1,382	+337.3%
2019	2,320	+67.9%
