= Bamako, Burkina Faso =

Bamako, Burkina Faso may refer to:

- Bamako, Bougouriba
- Bamako, Comoé
