= Kambeledaga =

Kambeledaga Kameledago
- Country: Burkina Faso
- Region: Sud-Ouest Region
- Province: Bougouriba Province
- Department: Iolonioro Department

Population (2019)
  - Total: 1,074

Kambeledaga is a village in the Iolonioro Department of Bougouriba Province in south-western Burkina Faso.

Population
Year	Pop.	±%
1985	73	—
2006	529	+624.7%
2019	1,074	+103.0%
