= Balignar =

- Country: Burkina Faso
- Region: Sud-Ouest Region
- Province: Bougouriba Province
- Department: Diébougou Department

Population (2019)
  - Total: 873

Balignar is a village in the Diébougou Department of Bougouriba Province in south-western Burkina Faso.

Population
Year	Pop.	±%
1985	517	—
2006	1,012	+95.7%
2019	873	−13.7%
