= Bonfesso =

Coordinates: 10°52′N 3°36′W

- Interactive map of Bonfesso
- Country: Burkina Faso
- Region: Sud-Ouest Region
- Province: Bougouriba Province
- Department: Bondigui Department

Population (2019)
  - Total: 1,082

Bonfesso or Gbonfesso is a village in the Bondigui Department of Bougouriba Province in south-western Burkina Faso.

Population
Year	Pop.	±%
1985	324	—
2006	633	+95.4%
2019	1,082	+70.9%
