= Lobignonao =

- Country: Burkina Faso
- Region: Sud-Ouest Region
- Province: Bougouriba Province
- Department: Tiankoura Department

Population (2019)
  - Total: 178

Lobignonao is a village in the Tiankoura Department of Bougouriba Province in south-western Burkina Faso.

Population
| Year | Pop. | ±% |
|---|---|---|
| 1985 | 136 | — |
| 2006 | 207 | +52.2% |
| 2019 | 178 | −14.0% |
