= Tiopanao =

Tiopanao Tiapanao
- Location in Burkina Faso
- Coordinates: 10°43′N 3°9′W
- Country: Burkina Faso
- Region: Sud-Ouest Region
- Province: Bougouriba Province
- Department: Tiankoura Department

Population (2019)
  - Total: 183

Tiopanao is a village in the Tiankoura Department of Bougouriba Province in south-western Burkina Faso.

Population
Year	Pop.	±%
1985	137	—
2006	264	+92.7%
2019	183	−30.7%
