= Sidoumoukar-Hiro =

- Country: Burkina Faso
- Region: Sud-Ouest Region
- Province: Bougouriba Province
- Department: Iolonioro Department

Population (2019)
  - Total: 120

Sidoumoukar-Hiro is a village in the Iolonioro Department of Bougouriba Province in south-western Burkina Faso.

Population
Year	Pop.	±%
1985	88	—
2006	117	+33.0%
2019	120	+2.6%
