= Bapla =

- Location in Burkina Faso
- Coordinates: 10°52′N 3°16′W
- Country: Burkina Faso
- Region: Sud-Ouest Region
- Province: Bougouriba Province
- Department: Diébougou Department

Population (2019)
  - Total: 2,175

Bapla is a town in the Diébougou Department of Bougouriba Province in south-western Burkina Faso.

Population
Year	Pop.	±%
1985	1,404	—
2006	1,155	−17.7%
2019	2,175	+88.3%
