= Orkounou =

- Location in Burkina Faso
- Coordinates: 10°46′N 3°20′W
- Country: Burkina Faso
- Region: Sud-Ouest Region
- Province: Bougouriba Province
- Department: Tiankoura Department

Population (2019)
  - Total: 459

Orkounou is a village in the Tiankoura Department of Bougouriba Province in south-western Burkina Faso.

Population
| Year | Pop. | ±% |
|---|---|---|
| 1985 | 430 | — |
| 2006 | 459 | +6.7% |
| 2019 | 459 | +0.0% |
