= Torkiaro =

Torkiaro Tokiero
- Country: Burkina Faso
- Region: Sud-Ouest Region
- Province: Bougouriba Province
- Department: Iolonioro Department

Population (2019)
  - Total: 214

Torkiaro is a village in the Iolonioro Department of Bougouriba Province in south-western Burkina Faso.

Population
Year	Pop.	±%
1985	179	—
2006	191	+6.7%
2019	214	+12.0%
