= Diébougou Department =

Coordinates: 10°37′N 3°15′W

Diébougou
- Department
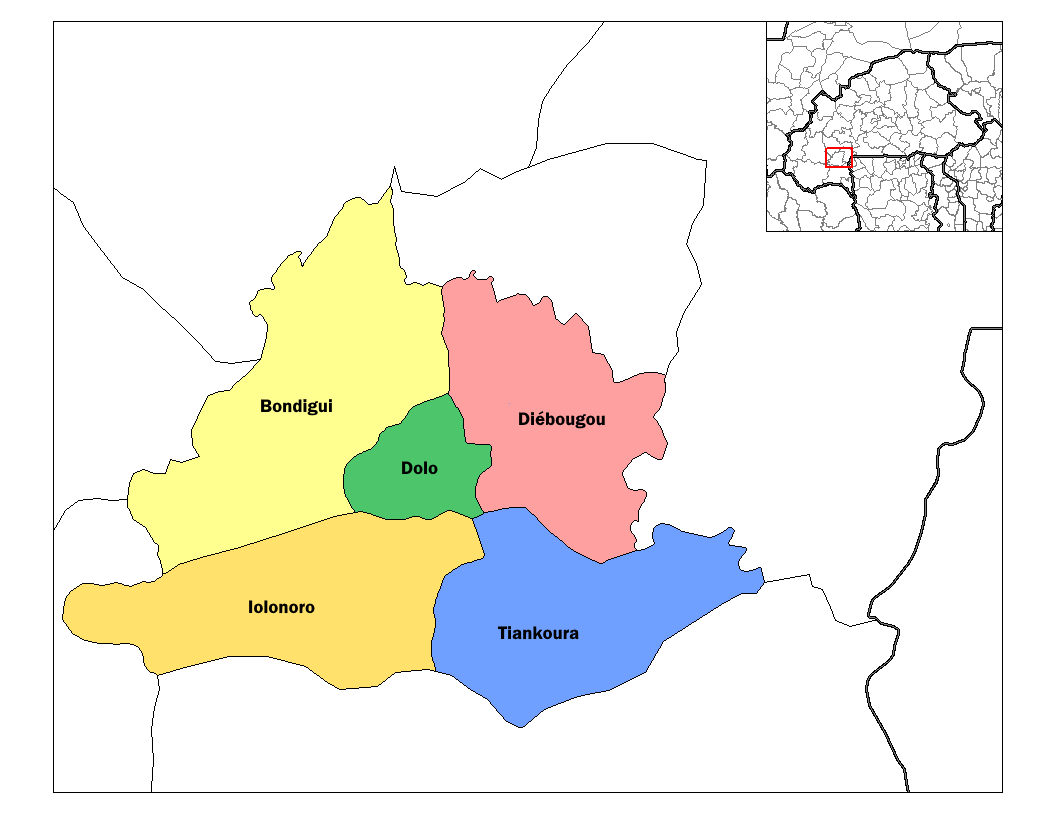
- Diébougou Department location in the province
- Country: Burkina Faso
- Region: Sud-Ouest Region
- Province: Bougouriba Province

Area
  - Department: 219 sq mi (567 km^{2})

Population (2019 census)
  - Department: 63,280
  - Density: 289/sq mi (112/km^{2})
  - Urban: 25,688
- Time zone: UTC+0 (GMT 0)

Diébougou is a department or commune of Bougouriba Province in south-western Burkina Faso. Its capital is the town of Diebougou. According to the 2019 census the department has a total population of 63,280.

== Towns and villages ==
· Diébougou · Balignar · Bamako · Bapla · Bapla-Birifor · Barindia · Dankoblé · Danko-Tanzou · Diasser · Kolepar · Konsabla · Lokodja · Mebar · Moulé · Moutori · Mouvielo · Naborgane · Navielgane · Segré · Sorgon · Tampé · Tansié · Tiedia · Voukoun ·
