= Iiolonioro =

- Interactive map of Iiolonioro
- Coordinates: 10°48′N 3°24′W
- Country: Burkina Faso
- Region: Sud-Ouest Region
- Province: Bougouriba Province
- Department: Iolonioro Department

Population (2019)
  - Total: 290

Iiolonioro is a village and seat of the Iolonioro Department of Bougouriba Province in south-western Burkina Faso.

Population
Year	Pop.	±%
1985	220	—
2006	355	+61.4%
2019	290	−18.3%
