= Wan, Burkina Faso =

Wan Ouan
- Country: Burkina Faso
- Region: Sud-Ouest Region
- Province: Bougouriba Province
- Department: Bondigui Department

Population (2019)
  - Total: 1,522

Wan is a town in the Bondigui Department of Bougouriba Province in south-western Burkina Faso.

Population
Year	Pop.	±%
1985	996	—
2006	1,102	+10.6%
2019	1,522	+38.1%
