= Tiankoura =

- Location in Burkina Faso
- Coordinates: 10°46′N 3°16′W
- Country: Burkina Faso
- Region: Sud-Ouest Region
- Province: Bougouriba Province
- Department: Tiankoura Department

Population (2019)
  - Total: 1,100

Tiankoura is the capital of the Tiankoura Department of Bougouriba Province in south-western Burkina Faso.

Population
Year	Pop.	±%
1985	326	—
2006	505	+54.9%
2019	1,100	+117.8%
