= Gairo, Burkina Faso =

Gairo
- Country: Burkina Faso
- Region: Sud-Ouest Region
- Province: Bougouriba Province
- Department: Iolonioro Department

Population (2019)
  - Total: 272

Gairo, Burkina Faso is a village in the Iolonioro Department of Bougouriba Province in south-western Burkina Faso.

Population
Year	Pop.	±%
1985	296	—
2006	468	+58.1%
2019	272	−41.9%
