= Iolonioro Department =

Coordinates: 10.7167°N 3.7167°W

Iolonioro
- Department
- Interactive map of Iolonioro
- Country: Burkina Faso
- Region: Sud-Ouest Region
- Province: Bougouriba Province

Area
  - Total: 262.7 sq mi (680.5 km^{2})

Population (2019)
  - Total: 35,351
  - Density: 134.5/sq mi (51.95/km^{2})
- Time zone: UTC+0 (GMT 0)

Iolonioro is a department or commune of Bougouriba Province in south-western Burkina Faso. Its capital lies at the town of Iiolonioro. According to the 2019 census the department has a population of 35,351.

== Towns and villages ==
Iiolonioro · Barkoura · Barsera · Binte · Botoro · Burkinao · Diassara · Djonlèra · Doumbouro · Dounkora · Dountelo · Gairo · Gbingue · Gomgombiro · Gongontiano · Hebrimpono · Kambeledaga · Koursera · Kpalbalo · Loukoura · Milpo · Niombouna · Niombripo · Nonkuéro · N’tonhero · Ouidiara · Pergdalembiro · Pokouro · Poyo · Sangolo · Sarambour · Saramboura · Sidoumoukar · Sidoumoukar-Hiro · Sinamanana · Tiarkiro · Tomena · Torkiaro · Werinkera · Yeyera · Younora ·
