= Wangara, Burkina Faso =

Wangara
- Location in Burkina Faso
- Coordinates: 10°43′N 3°15′W
- Country: Burkina Faso
- Region: Sud-Ouest Region
- Province: Bougouriba Province
- Department: Tiankoura Department

Population (2019)
  - Total: 630

Wangara is a village in the Tiankoura Department of Bougouriba Province in south-western Burkina Faso.

Population
Year	Pop.	±%
1985	372	—
2006	573	+54.0%
2019	630	+9.9%
