= Dulu =

Dulu may refer to:

== People ==
- Mujibur Rahman Dulu (1955–2025), Bangladeshi film editor and screenwriter
- Mohammad Ruhul Quddus Talukdar Dulu (born 1962), Bangladeshi politician, lawyer and former deputy land minister
- Delwar Hossain Khan Dulu, Bangladeshi politician
- Asadul Habib Dulu, Bangladeshi politician and former deputy minister of food and disaster management

== Places ==
- Dulu, North Khorasan, Iran
- Dulu, Razavi Khorasan, Iran

== See also ==
- Duolu
- Dulo (disambiguation)
- Dolo (disambiguation)
