= Wangara =

Wangara may refer to:

- The Soninke Wangara of West Africa
- Dyula people of West Africa
- Wangara, Western Australia
- Wangara, Burkina Faso
