= Danko-Tanzou =

- Location in Burkina Faso
- Coordinates: 10.8501°N 3.232876°W
- Country: Burkina Faso
- Region: Sud-Ouest Region
- Province: Bougouriba Province
- Department: Diébougou Department

Population (2019)
  - Total: 492

Danko-Tanzou is a village in the Diébougou Department of Bougouriba Province in south- western Burkina Faso.

Population
Year	Pop.	±%
1985	205	—
2006	228	+11.2%
2019	492	+115.8%
