= Legmoin Department =

Coordinates: 10°09′N 2°54′W

Legmoin
- Department
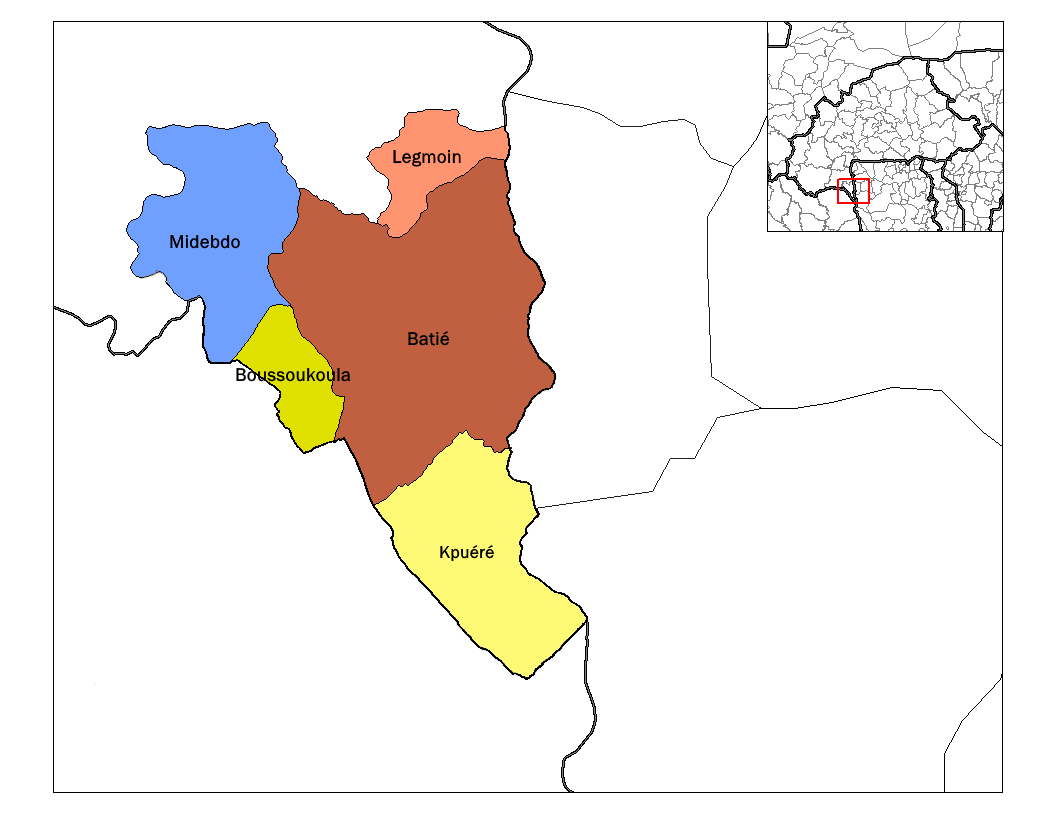
- Legmoin Department location in the province
- Country: Burkina Faso
- Province: Noumbiel Province

Area
  - Total: 75.1 sq mi (194.6 km^{2})

Population (2019 census)
  - Total: 19,031
  - Density: 253.3/sq mi (97.80/km^{2})
- Time zone: UTC+0 (GMT 0)

Legmoin is a department or commune of Noumbiel Province in south-eastern Burkina Faso. Its capital lies at the town of Legmoin.
