= Bondigui =

- Town
- Location in Burkina Faso
- Coordinates: 10°55′N 3°29′W
- Country: Burkina Faso
- Region: Sud-Ouest Region
- Province: Bougouriba Province
- Department: Bondigui Department

Population (2019)
  - Total: 6,241

Bondigui is the capital of the Bondigui Department of Bougouriba Province in south-western Burkina Faso.

Population
Year	Pop.	±%
1985	2,331	—
2006	3,427	+47.0%
2019	6,241	+82.1%
