= Bondigui Department =

Coordinates: 10°55′00″N 3°29′00″W

Bondigui
- Department
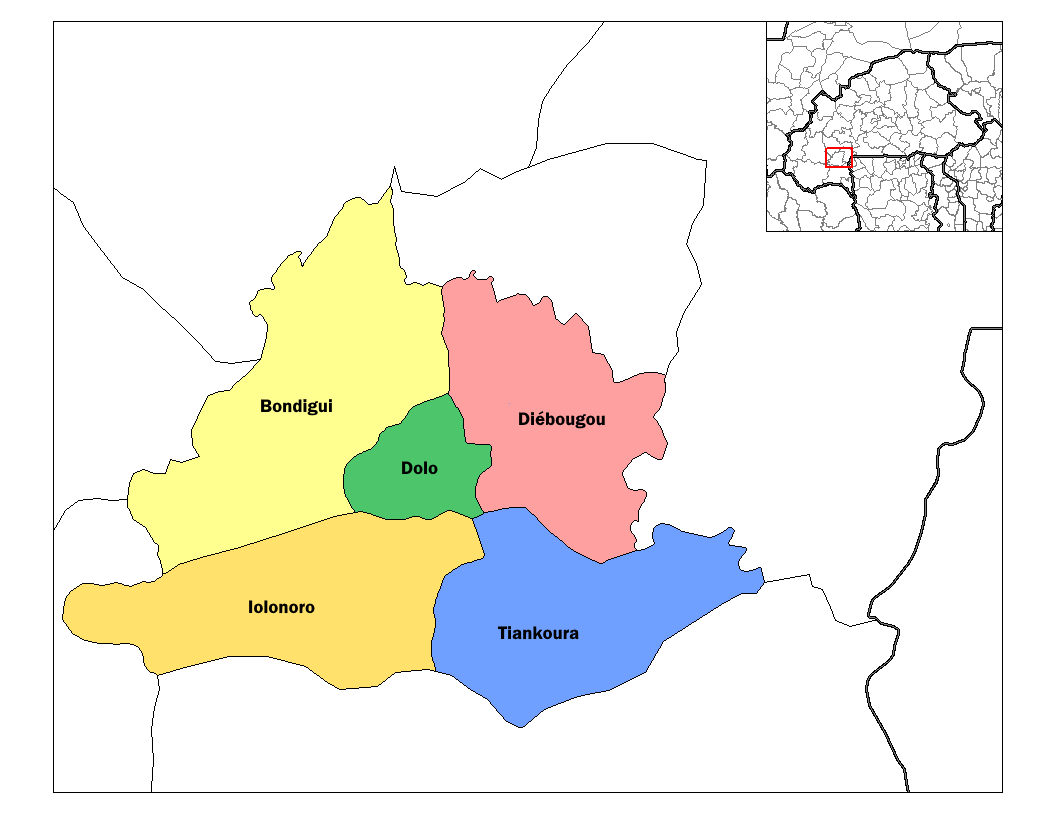
- Interactive map of Bondigui
- Country: Burkina Faso
- Province: Bougouriba Province

Population (2006)
  - Total: 18,782
- Time zone: UTC+0 (GMT 0)

Bondigui is a department or commune of Bougouriba Province in south-western Burkina Faso. Its capital lies at the town of Bondigui. According to the 2006 census the department has a total population of 18,782.

== Towns and villages ==
· Bondigui · Bonfesso · Darodine · Diarkadougou · Intiédougou · Kobogo · Kpèdia · Mougué · Nabalé · Nabéré · Nahirindon · Obro · Sorindigui · Wan · Zanawa-Pougouli
