= Rubeho =

- Town and ward
- Location in Tanzania
- Coordinates: 06°15′28″S 036°51′55″E
- Country: Tanzania
- Region: Morogoro Region
- District: Gairo District

Population (2002)
  - Total: 17,020
- Time zone: UTC+3 (EAT)
- Postcode: 67702

Rubeho is a town and ward in Gairo District in the Morogoro Region of Tanzania, East Africa. As of 2002, the population of the ward was 17,020. Prior to 2012, Rubeho was administered by Kilosa District.

The ward consists of a town, Rubeho, one large village, Masenge, and two rural agglomerates, Kwipipa and Kisitwi. Each of these has denominated rural areas or small villages under them.

| Rubeho | Masenge | Kwipipa | Kisitwi |
|---|---|---|---|
| Mjini (town) | Masenge | Chisiga | Ititu |
| Chamawe | Chinolo | Mkokani | Manyemba |
| Ikenje | Kishambo | Ofisini | Muheza |
| Kichangani / Jumbadimwe | | Shuleni | Shuleni |
