= Danko (given name) =

Danko is a South Slavic-language diminutive form of the Hebrew given name Daniel.

- Danko (singer), (born 1969), Russian pop singer
- Danko Bošković (born 1982), German footballer
- Danko Cvjetićanin (born 1963), Croatian basketball player
- Danko Grlić (1923–1984), Yugoslav Marxist writer
- Danko Herceg (born 1974), Croatian slalom canoer
- Danko Jones, Canadian musician
- Danko Kovačević (born 1991), Montenegrin footballer
- Danko Marinelli (born 1987), Croatian alpine skier
- Danko Matrljan (born 1960), Croatian footballer
- Danko Lazović (born 1983), Serbian footballer
- Danko Ljuština (born 1952), Croatian actor
- Danko Opančina (born 1990), Serbian footballer
- Danko Popović (1928–2009), Serbian writer and playwright
- Danko Sipka (born 1962) lexicographer

== Fictional characters ==
- Danko, the hero from a legend in the story "Old Izergil" by Maxim Gorky
