= Dulo (disambiguation) =

Dulo may refer to:

- Dulo clan (or House of Dulo), from which descended the earliest Bulgarian Dynasty
- Dulo, Mandara, the capital of the historical Mandara kingdom in what is now Cameroon

== See also ==
- Dolo (disambiguation)
- Jennifer Dulos
- Dulu (disambiguation)
