= Bamako, Bougouriba =

Bamako
- Location in Burkina Faso
- Coordinates: 10°56′N 3°20′W
- Country: Burkina Faso
- Region: Sud-Ouest Region
- Province: Bougouriba Province
- Department: Diébougou Department

Population (2019)
  - Total: 1,611

Bamako is a village in the Diébougou Department of Bougouriba Province in south-western Burkina Faso.

Population
Year	Pop.	±%
1985	946	—
2006	913	−3.5%
2019	1,611	+76.5%
