= Tiankoura Department =

Coordinates: 10.75°N 3.25°W

Tiankoura
- Department
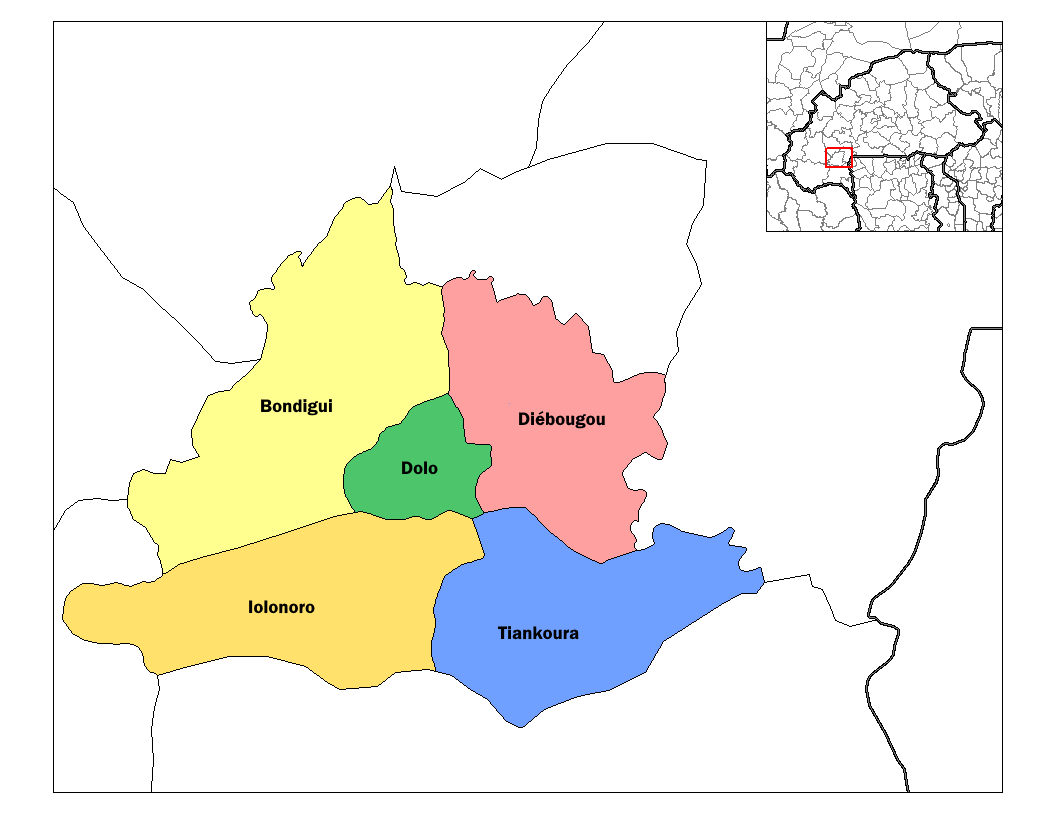
- Tiankoura Department location in the province
- Country: Burkina Faso
- Province: Bougouriba Province

Area
  - Total: 215.3 sq mi (557.6 km^{2})

Population (2019 census)
  - Total: 14,681
  - Density: 68.19/sq mi (26.33/km^{2})
- Time zone: UTC+0 (GMT 0)

Tiankoura is a department or commune of Bougouriba Province in south-western Burkina Faso. Its capital lies at the town of Tiankoura. According to the 2019 census the department has a total population of 14,681.

== Towns and villages ==
· Tiankoura · Balambiro · Bombara · Dangbara · Diebiro · Diourao · Elfora · Gongoura · Guimbissenao · Kankoura · Kanseo · Kimpeo · Kolonkoura · Kouloh · Kourguenou · Kourou · Kpolo · Lobignonao · Minao · Niempiro · Nkinora · N’tonhiro · Odara · Orkounou · Palembera · Sehintiro · Sinkiro · Sounkpourouna · Tinguera · Tiopanao · Tordiera · Uleo · Waltièra · Wangara · Yèbèlèla · Yèlèla
