= Bontioli Reserve =

- IUCN category IV (habitat/species management area)
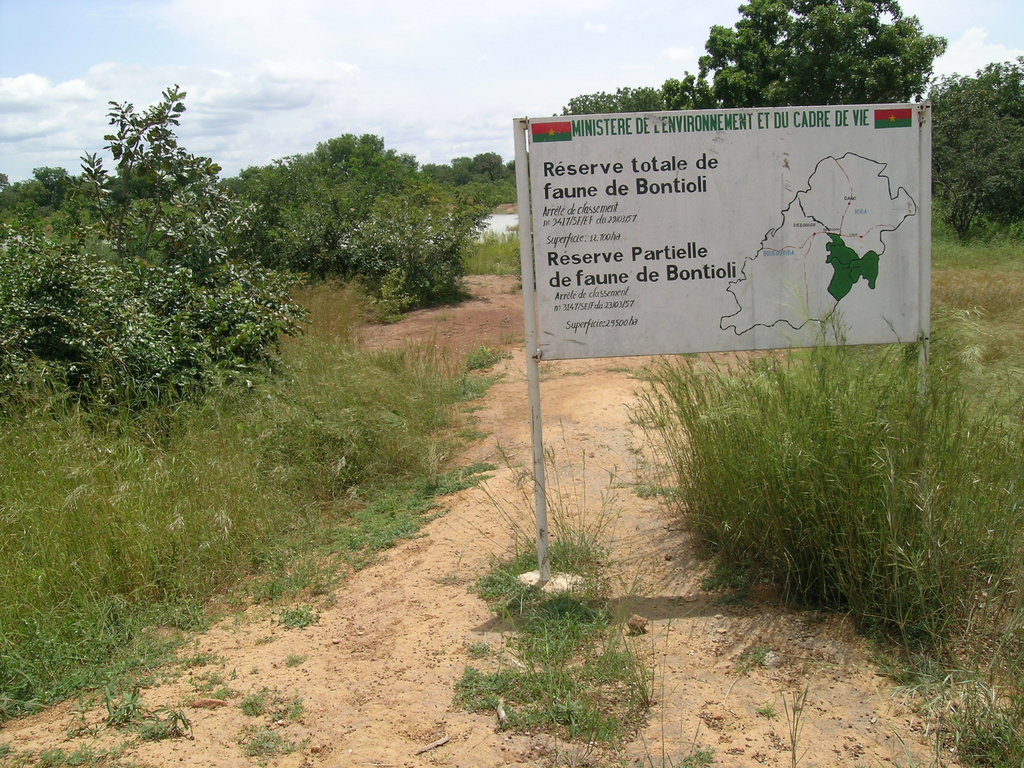
- Entrance sign

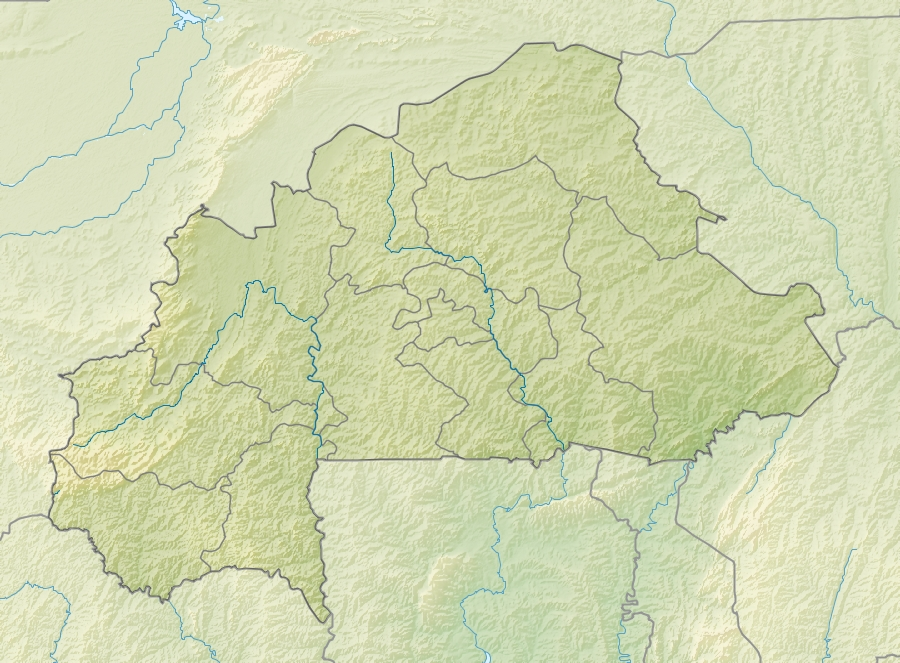
- Location within Burkina Faso
- Location: Bougouriba Province, Burkina Faso
- Coordinates: 10.859°N 3.123°W
- Area: 127 km^{2} (49 mi^{2})
- Established: 1957

Bontioli Reserve is one of three complete reserve in Burkina Faso. Established in 1957, it is located in Bougouriba Province and covers an area of 127 km^{2} (49 mi^{2}).

The reserve is located at 262 meters above sea level.

Bontioli Reserve is one of the country's wildlife sanctuaries with high biodiversity.

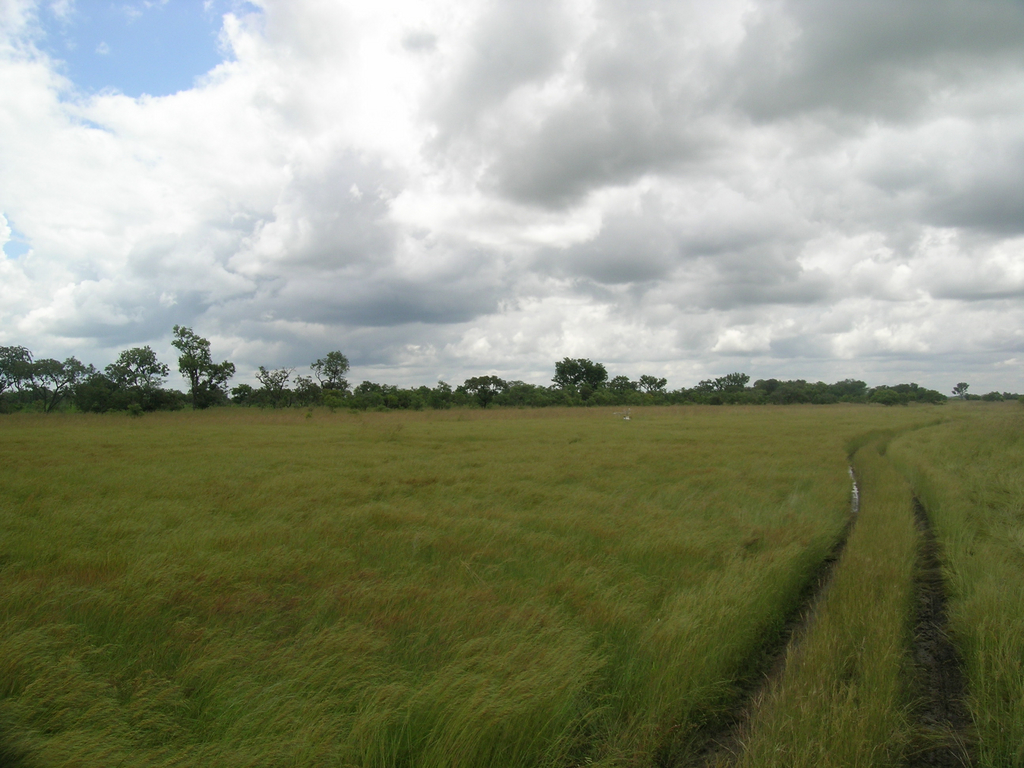
