= Batié Department =

Coordinates: 9°53′00″N 2°55′00″W

Batié
- Department
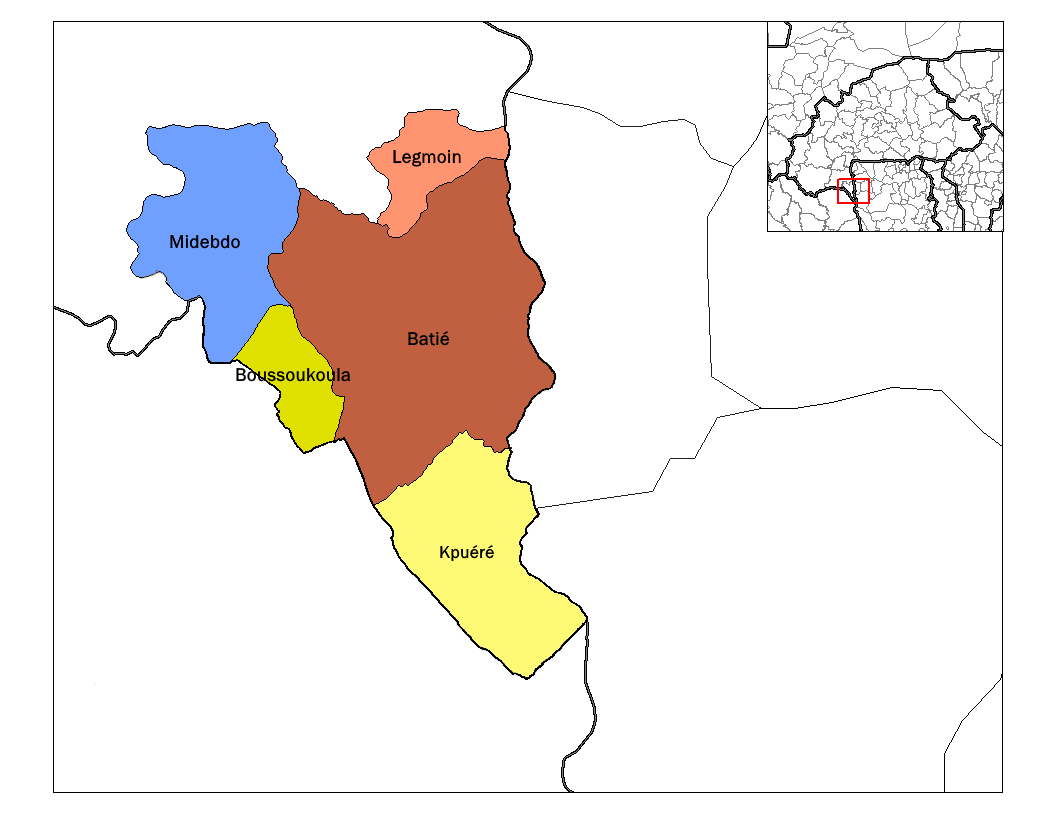
- Batié Department location in the province
- Country: Burkina Faso
- Province: Noumbiel Province

Area
  - Department: 498 sq mi (1,289 km^{2})

Population (2019 census)
  - Department: 44,525
  - Density: 89.46/sq mi (34.54/km^{2})
  - Urban: 17,997
- Time zone: UTC+0 (GMT 0)

Batié is a department or commune of Noumbiel Province in southeastern Burkina Faso. Its capital is the town of Batié.
