= Mandege =

- ward
- Location in Tanzania
- Coordinates: 06°21′00″S 36°55′30″E
- Country: Tanzania
- Region: Morogoro Region
- District: Gairo District

Population (November 2022)
  - Total: 9,625
- Time zone: UTC+3 (EAT)
- Postcode: 67703

Mandege is an administrative ward in Gairo District in the Morogoro Region of Tanzania, East Africa. As of August 2022, the population of the ward was 9,625. The Mandege Forest Station, headquarters for the Mamiwa Forest Reserve, is located there.

The ward consists of two rural agglomerates, Ikwamba, and Njungwa. Each of these has denominated rural areas or small villages under them.

Ikwamba	Njungwa
Ikwamba Shuleni	Chiganga
Matongo	Makowo
Midindo	Midenghe
Tegeta	Mihafe
	Msilibuha
