= Diébougou =

- Location within Burkina Faso, West Africa
- Coordinates: 10°58′N 3°15′W
- Country: Burkina Faso
- Region: Sud-Ouest Region
- Province: Bougouriba Province
- Elevation: 291 m (955 ft)

Population (2019)
  - Total: 25,688
- Time zone: UTC+0 (GMT)

Diébougou is the capital of the Diebougou Department, situated 136 kilometres (85 mi) south-east of Bobo-Dioulasso on the main highway to Ghana. It is located 74 kilometres north of Gaoua and 133 km west of Leo, Burkina Faso and is the capital of Bougouriba Province.

The town was captured by the French Colonial forces in May 1897; they established a military base there.

The town is an important market town and has a range of crafts, including pottery and basket work. There are caves near the town known to locals as les grottes. They were built under the French colonial command around 1900 using forced labour and form a network of tunnels to the west of the town.

There is also a swamp with crocodiles.

Population
Year	Pop.	±%
1985	6,761	—
2006	17,937	+165.3%
2019	25,688	+43.2%
