= Chagongwe =

- Town and ward
- Interactive map of Chagongwe
- Country: Tanzania
- Region: Morogoro Region
- District: Gairo District

Population (2002)
  - Total: 7,337
- Time zone: UTC+3 (EAT)
- Postcode: 67704

Chagongwe is a town and administrative ward in Gairo District in the Morogoro Region of Tanzania, East Africa. As of 2002, the population of the ward was 7,337. There is a government-run dispensary and a primary school there. The only access to the town is over a single lane, unimproved road.

The ward consists of the town of Chagongwe and two villages, Mkobwe and Lufikiri. Each of these has denominated rural areas or small villages under them.

Chagongwe	Mkobwe	Lufikiri
Mihimbo	Mkobwe	Lufikiri
Chungu	Mkobwe Misheni	Chandwa
Unjeluni	Mkobwe Nhjiapanda	Kidongo chekundu
Rubeho	Itungi	Chipindi
Magiha	Madewa	Nghima
Joshoni	Mahanga	Lujua
Chijula	Kidete	Majani
Ndete	Mahowe	Ipondelo
Ubenani	Msasani	
Idibo		
Denalya		
Ilakale		
Mlandisi		
Mahongoli		
