= Wans =

Wans or WANS, may refer to:

- West African National Secretariat
- WANS (AM 1280), a defunct radio station in Anderson, South Carolina, United States
- WJMZ-FM (107.3 FM), a radio station in Anderson, South Carolina, United States, formerly known as WANS-FM from 1963 until 1991.
- Jan Baptist Martin Wans (1628–1687) Flemish Baroque painter

== See also ==
- Wan (disambiguation)
