= Dolo, Burkina Faso =

Dolo
- Location in Burkina Faso
- Coordinates: 10°52′0″N 3°24′0″W
- Country: Burkina Faso
- Region: Sud-Ouest Region
- Province: Bougouriba Province
- Department: Dolo Department

Population (2019)
  - Total: 3,890

Dolo is the capital of the Dolo Department of Bougouriba Province in south-western Burkina Faso.

Population
Year	Pop.	±%
1985	654	—
2006	3,115	+376.3%
2019	3,890	+24.9%
