= Dolo Department =

Coordinates: 10°52′N 3°24′W

Dolo
- Department
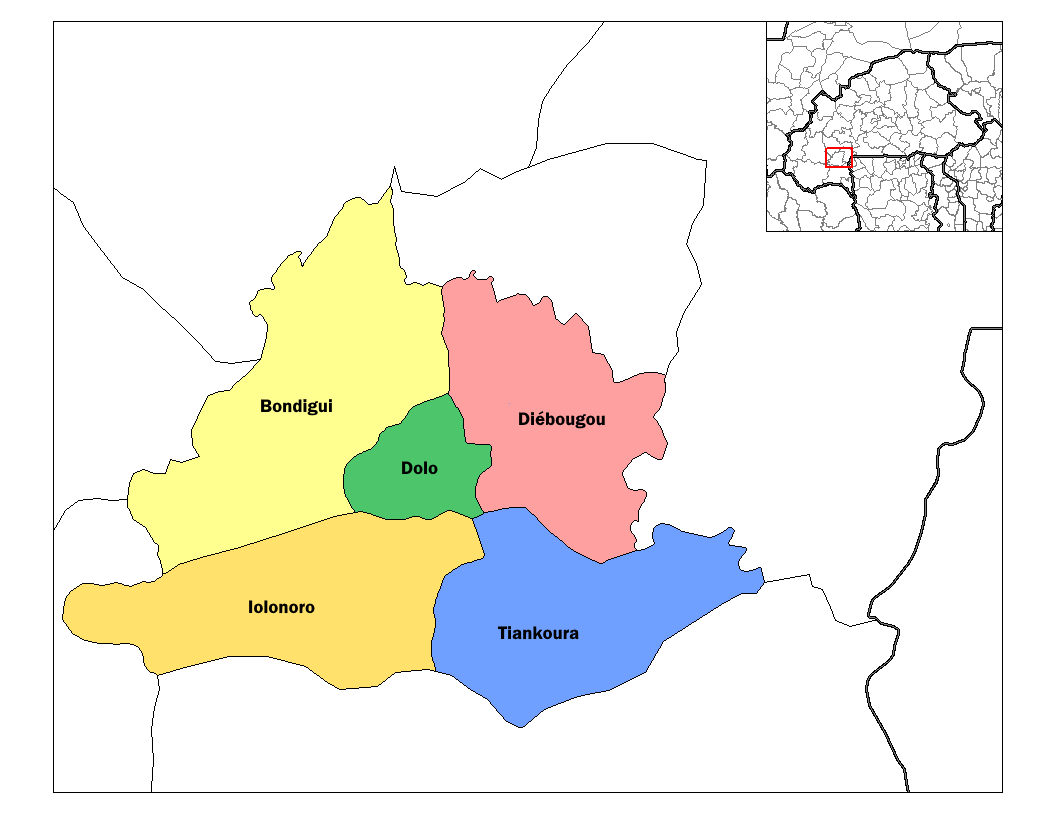
- Dolo Department location in the province
- Country: Burkina Faso
- Province: Bougouriba Province

Population (1996)
  - Total: 8,910
- Time zone: UTC+0 (GMT 0)

Dolo is a department or commune of Bougouriba Province in south-western Burkina Faso. Its capital lies at the town of Dolo. According to the 1996 census the department has a total population of 8.910 .

== Towns and villages ==
· Dolo · Bèkoro · Bohéro · Diagnon · Dolindia · Goumpologo · Hèllèlè · Milkpo · Nicéo · Nouvielgane · Olbontouné · Saptan · Soussoubro · Tinkiro-Lobi ·
