= Wan, Pakistan =

Coordinates: 32°25′N 71°42′E

Wan is a village in the Sialkot District in the Punjab province of Pakistan. It is situated between the cities of Daska, Sambrial and Wazirabad.it is in Tehsil Sambrial.
