= Gairo District =

- District
- Gairo District of Morogoro Region
- Coordinates: 06°16′S 036°55′E
- Country: Tanzania
- Region: Morogoro Region

Area
  - Total: 1,971 km^{2} (761 sq mi)

Population (2022)
  - Total: 258,205
  - Density: 131.0/km^{2} (339.3/sq mi)

Gairo District is one of the seven districts of the Morogoro Region of Tanzania. It is located in the northwest corner of Morogoro Region. The administrative seat is in the town of Gairo. According to the 2022 Tanzania National Census, the population of Gairo District was 258,205 in 2022.

== History ==
Gairo District was formally established when it was gazetted in March 2012. Prior to that Gairo was a division of Kilosa District.

== Administrative subdivisions ==
=== Constituencies ===
For parliamentary elections, Tanzania is divided into constituencies. As of the 2010 elections the area that became Gairo District (formerly part of Kilosa District) had one constituency:

- Gairo Constituency

=== Divisions ===
Gairo District is administratively divided into divisions.

=== Wards ===
As of 2012, Gairo District was administratively divided into eight wards:

- Gairo
- Mandege
- Rubeho
- Chagongwe
- Chanjale
- Kibedya
- Chakwale
- Iyogwe
