= Dolo (automobile) =

The Dolo was a French automobile advertised and exhibited during 1947 and 1948.

== Background ==
The car came from a business called Brun, Dolo & Galtier (BDG) located at Pierrefitte. Messrs Brun, Dolo and Galtier were hitherto unknown in motor industry circles, but the car looked modern and affordable when compared to the offerings provided by the known auto-makers. The prototype had its first outing at the 1947 Salon de Paris (primarily an art fair) and six months later appeared at the Paris Motor Show in October 1947. The next year it turned up at the Spring Motor Shows at Geneva and Brussels.

== The first car ==
The company's first car, the Dolo JB-10, was a futuristic front-wheel-drive two-seater. The driver and passenger were accommodated under a Plexiglas/Perspex dome. The engine was a 592 cc air-cooled boxer unit offering up a maximum of 23 hp, and the gear box was a four-speed manual unit featuring synchromesh on the two top ratios. Although the prototype was presented at a succession of motor-shows the bonnet/hood always remained firmly closed, and it is not certain that the car exhibited ever contained a functioning engine.

From the tone of some normally serious sources, it is not clear whether the Dolo JB-10 is best regarded as a serious commercial project or as an elaborate and fantastical hoax. The car seems to have attracted some orders, supported by cash deposits, on its tour of the motor shows, and according to one source about 200 were to have been produced before the business was wound up by the courts in 1948.

== The second car ==
As they exhibited the JB-10, the company let it be known that they were also working on a larger Dolo JB-20. The catalogue showed that this would have a similar body, complete with Perspex dome, to the JB-10, but it would be a little larger and would seat four. An air-cooled 8-cylinder boxer motor of 1,184 cc would be fitted, delivering a maximum of 44 hp. Simple maths suggests that this interesting-sounding unit would essentially amount to two of the four-cylinder units from the smaller car bolted together.

== Sources and further reading ==
- G.N. Georgano : Autos. Encyclopédie complète. 1885 à nos jours. Courtille, 1975 (In French)
