= Danko (surname) =

Danko is a surname. Literally it is a diminutive of Daniel in some Slavic languages. Notable people with this surname include:

- Andrej Danko (born 1974), Slovak lawyer and politician, Speaker of the National Council of the Slovak Republic
- Béla Dankó, Hungarian parliamentarian
- Betty Danko (1903–1979), Hollywood stuntwoman and stunt double
- Danny Danko, American writer and photographer
- Gary Danko, American chef
- Harold Danko (born 1947), American jazz pianist
- James Danko, American academic administrator
- John-Paul Danko, Canadian politician
- Rick Danko (1942–1999), Canadian musician, singer and songwriter, member of The Band
- Rozália Danková (1920–2017), Slovak Roman Catholic nun
- Stanislav Danko (born 1994), Slovak footballer
- Taras Danko (born 1980), Ukrainian wrestler
- Terry Danko (born 1949), Canadian musician and songwriter

== Fictional ==
- Emile Danko, character on the television series Heroes
- Ivan Danko, fictional Soviet officer in the film Red Heat
