= Gairo, Tanzania =

Gairo
- Town and ward
- Location in Tanzania
- Coordinates: 06°08′34″S 36°52′10″E
- Country: Tanzania
- Region: Morogoro Region
- District: Gairo District

Area
  - Town and ward: 106.8 km^{2} (41.2 sq mi)

Population (2012 census)
  - Town and ward: 33,209
  - Density: 310.9/km^{2} (805.3/sq mi)
  - Urban: 22,948
- Time zone: UTC+3 (EAT)
- Postcode: 67701
- Climate: Cwa

Gairo is a large town and an administrative ward in Gairo District in the Morogoro Region of Tanzania, East Africa. The town is the administrative centre for Gairo District. It is located on the main Dodoma to Dar es Salaam road and is a transshipment point, as well as a shipping point for the agricultural products of the district. As of 2012, the town's population was 22,948,

As of 2002, the population of the ward was 35,638. Ethnically, the people are mostly Kaguru.
