= Old Izergil =

- Short story by Maxim Gorky
- Original title: Старуха Изергиль
- Country: Russia
- Language: Russian

Publication
- Published in: Samarskaya Gazeta
- Publication date: 12 September 1892

"Old Izergil" (Russian: Старуха Изергиль) is an 1895 short story by Maxim Gorky, written in the autumn of 1894 and first published by Samarskaya Gazeta, issues 80, 86 and 89, on 16, 23 and 27 April respectively.

== Publication ==
Instrumental in getting the story published was Vladimir Korolenko, who would be later credited with 'discovering' Gorky. On 4 October 1894 he informed Mikhail Sablin, a member of the Russkiye Vedomosti staff: "Some three days ago I sent to [the newspaper] the manuscript by Peshkov (writing under the pseudonym Maxim Gorky), called 'Old Izergil'."

== Plot ==
It's sunset and the narrator rests amidst the Moldovan vineyards, watching men and women returning home from work, singing songs. With him is Izergil, once beautiful, now a very old, decrepit woman. She scolds him for being so withdrawn ("You Russians are born already old men!"), then starts telling him stories.

I.
The first one, having to do with the origins of the mysterious moving shadow (which she claims to see, although the narrator doesn't), is the legend of Larra, the son of an eagle and a woman. Larra enters the local community of men full of pride and with no concern or respect for others, knowing just one law, that of his own desires. A young woman thwarts his approaches and gets brutally killed. Outraged, the men try to figure out the proper way to punish the villain. Then the wisest one suggests that they should just let him go, for that would be the worst fate for this evil creature, bound to punish himself. For many years he fights them, then starts longing for death, but such is the curse upon him that he cannot die. He tries to kill himself but fails. Left alone, wandering on his own, after many years he gradually turns into a shadow doomed to wander the world forever.

II.
After informing the narrator that "health is like gold, it is there to be spared", Izergil relates to him the story of her rather turbulent love life. Among the men whom she had, unrepentantly, discarded, were:
— the fisherman from Prut whom she fell in love as a teenager girl, but soon got bored with;
— the red-haired Gutsul outlaw. He was later hanged, along with the fisherman (who'd joined the same gang), after being betrayed by a Romanian landlord; the latter has been punished severely for this, and Izergil apparently had some part in the deed;
— the rich middle-aged Turk whose harem she agreed to join in Bucharest;
— his 16-old son whom she soon eloped with to Bulgaria, where a woman stabbed her ("for either her husband, or fiancé, I don't remember");
— a Polish man, described as 'funny and mean', but also prone to offensive remarks for one of which she threw him into the river and went away;
— a Jew who bought her to make her sell her body;
— the handsome Szlachta man whom she fell in love with, and later (after he'd been imprisoned for taking part in the January Uprising) helped escaping from the Russian prison camp, killing a guardsman.

III.
Izergil asks the narrator if he sees the blueish sparks in the field, as the night falls, and when he says he does, tells him the story of their origins.

In the old times and the distant lands, a small community of people, driven out of their homeland by the enemy, enter the dark and dangerous forest. Surrounded by darkness and paralyzed with fear, they still have to go forward, into the unknown, for with them are the old testaments of their forefathers. The moment comes when things become so intolerable that they start talking about turning round and surrendering. But the young man named Danko arises and encourages them to move on, taking up the role of their leader.

For a while they follow him enthusiastically, then the discontent starts to grow again. The great storm breaks out, and, horrified by the rain and lightning, they blame Danko for everything that happened to them. Overcome by rage, but also the desire to help out this ungrateful crowd, he tears his chest up, and rises his flaming heart up, as a lantern. Their way suddenly lightened, the people rush forward, soon reach the end to the path and then suddenly find themselves in the sun, among beautiful fields washed with fresh rain. Everybody forgets about Danko who, left behind and bleeding, falls down and dies. Just one last man, perhaps fearing something, approaches him and tramples down the embers of his heart, sending blue sparks around and away.

== Background, influences and interpretations ==
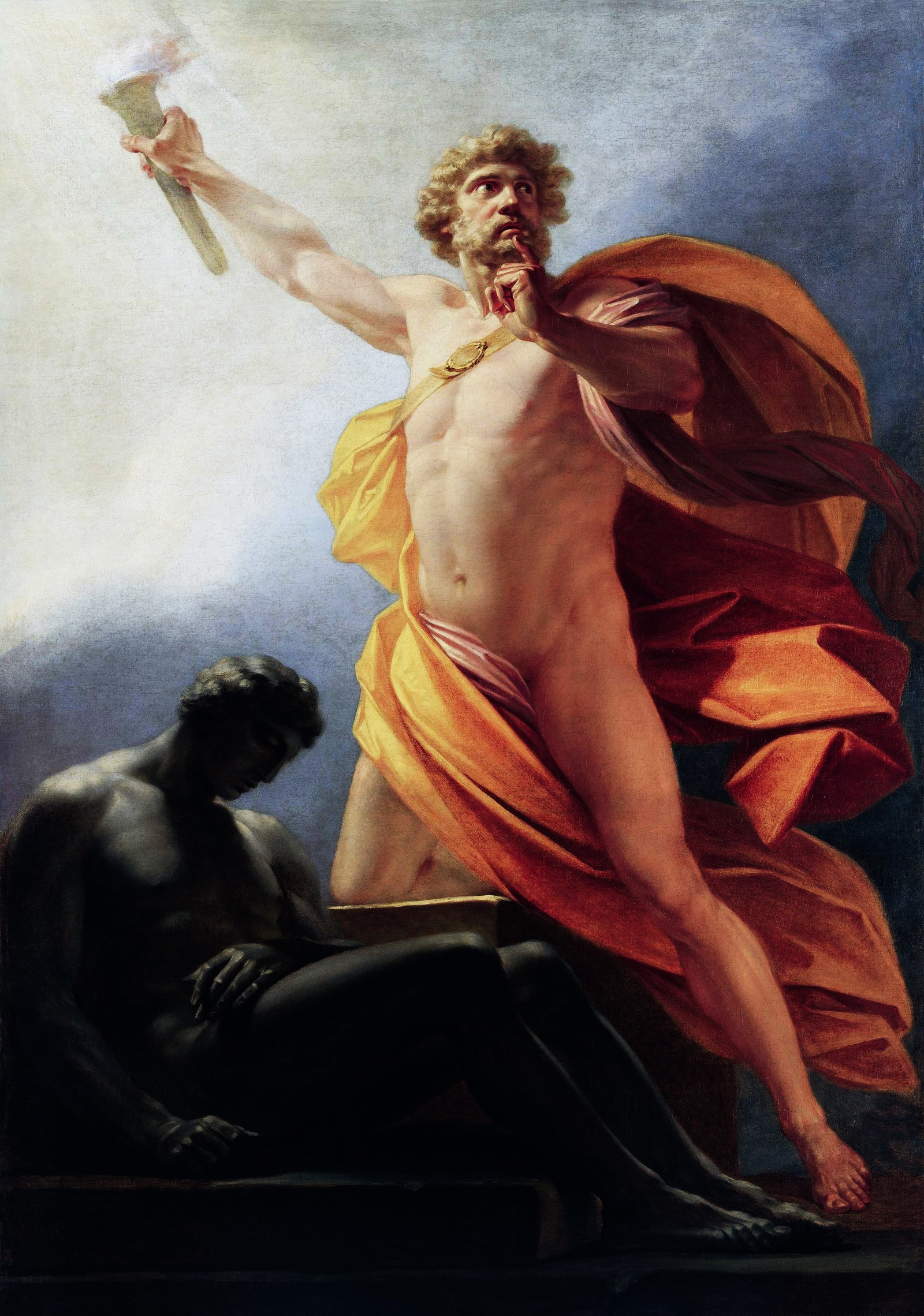
"Prometheus Brings Fire to Mankind" By Heinrich Fueger, 1817

"Old Izergil" was inspired by the trip to Bessarabia and Romania which Gorky had made four years earlier. The Moldovan writer and folklorist George Bogach traces the origins of the name Izergil to two sources: the Akkerman toponym Iserlia and Kara-Ningil, the character of the Mamin-Sibiryak story "Tears of the Queen". The Gorky biographer V.A. Maksimova notes that phonetically "Izergil" is close to "Iggradzil", the giant ash of the Scandinavian mythology, similar to the Biblical Tree of Knowledge. It is connected to the three worlds, those of the dead, the living and the gods, respectively.

The name Danko, according to the critic V.A. Khanov, comes from the Russian "dan" (in the general sense, 'the given thing'). The Slav god of light is Dažbog, which is "the giving god". But George Bogach in his book "Gorky and the Moldavian Folklore" states that the 'Danko' is of the Romani origins, meaning "the youngest son" or "little gypsy boy".

Some aspects of the legend of Danko echo the story of the Exodus, but while Moses, a harsh disciplinarian, is inspired by God, Danko is motivated by his "great love for the people" and is closer to the figure of Christ, Khanov argues, noting also that the story's structure may have to do with the notion of the World tree, Larra, Izergil and Danko representing its bottom, middle and top sections, respectively.

The Gorky biographer Pavel Basinsky stresses the importance of considering the early Gorky as a Nietzsche follower, something that the Soviet critics have made a point to overlook. Gorky himself in a 1912 article published by the Dagens Nyheter newspaper, cited August Strindberg as an influence and compared him with "the poet Danko". (Note: The fact that there is no mentioning Danko being a poet in the known version of the text, suggests the possibility that the original concept of the story might have gone through some modifications.) Another hero for Gorky was the Bulgarian poet Pencho Slaveykov. One of the latter's poems, "The Heart of Hearts", on the death of the English poet Percy Bysshe Shelley, might have influenced the young Gorky too. Irina Yeryomina also sees the two images, of Danko who wished his heart to "burn brighter than the Sun" and Shelley, consumed by the storm, as directly linked.

The story of the youth with a flaming heart might have had to do with the image of Prometheus, according to Svetlana Guiss. Khanov agrees, stating that the associations with Jesus and Prometheus could be seen as one for Gorky considered the myth of Prometheus, "as being, in a distorted form, hidden in the story of Christ". Irina Yeryomina, notes that Gorky, as "fire worshipper" himself, knew well Empedocles's On Nature from which he drew some influence too.
