= Noumbiel Province =

Coordinates: 9°50′N 3°00′W

Noumbiel
- Province
- Location in Burkina Faso

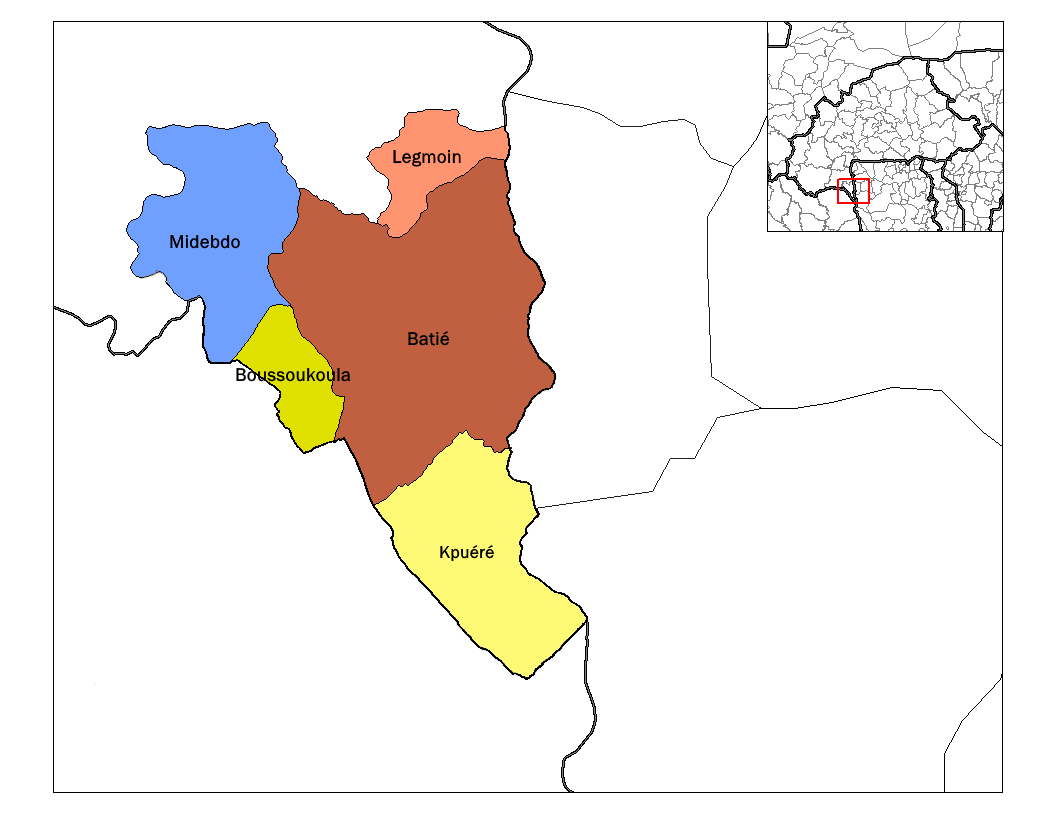
- Provincial map of its departments
- Country: Burkina Faso
- Region: Sud-Ouest Region
- Capital: Batié

Area
  - Province: 2,736 km^{2} (1,056 sq mi)

Population (2019 census)
  - Province: 98,883
  - Density: 36.14/km^{2} (93.61/sq mi)
  - Urban: 17,997
- Time zone: UTC+0 (GMT 0)

Noumbiel is one of the 45 provinces of Burkina Faso, located in its Sud-Ouest Region. The province is the least populated province in the country.

Its capital is Batié.

== Departments ==
Noumbiel is divided into 4 departments:

- Batié
- Kpuere
- Legmoin
- Midebdo

== See also ==
- Regions of Burkina Faso
- Provinces of Burkina Faso
- Departments of Burkina Faso
