= Bamako, Comoé =

Coordinates: 10°32′56″N 4°26′51″W

Bamako
- Interactive map of Bamako
- Country: Burkina Faso
- Region: Cascades Region
- Province: Comoé Province
- Department: Tiéfora Department

Population (2019)
  - Total: 2,922

Bamako is a town in the Tiéfora Department of Comoé Province in south-western Burkina Faso.

Population
Year	Pop.	±%
2006	1,871	—
2019	2,922	+56.2%
