= Batié, Burkina Faso =

- Town
- Location within Burkina Faso, West Africa
- Coordinates: 9°53′N 2°55′W
- Country: Burkina Faso

Population (2019 census)
  - Total: 17,997
- Time zone: UTC+0 (GMT)
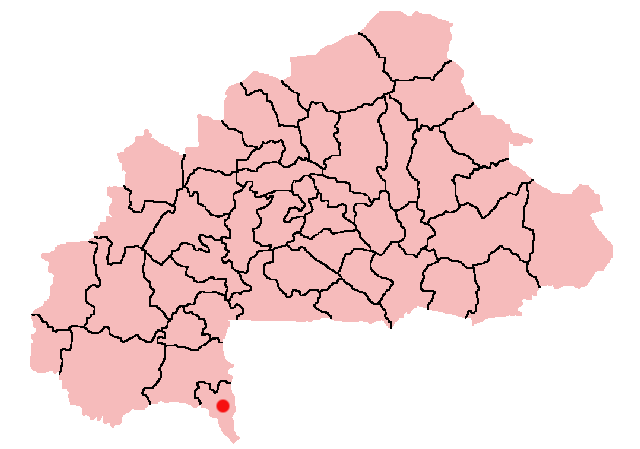
- Location of Batié in Burkina Faso

Batié is a town located in the province of Noumbiel in Burkina Faso. It is the capital of Noumbiel Province and has a population of 17,997 (2019).
