= Bougouriba Province =

Bougouriba
- Province
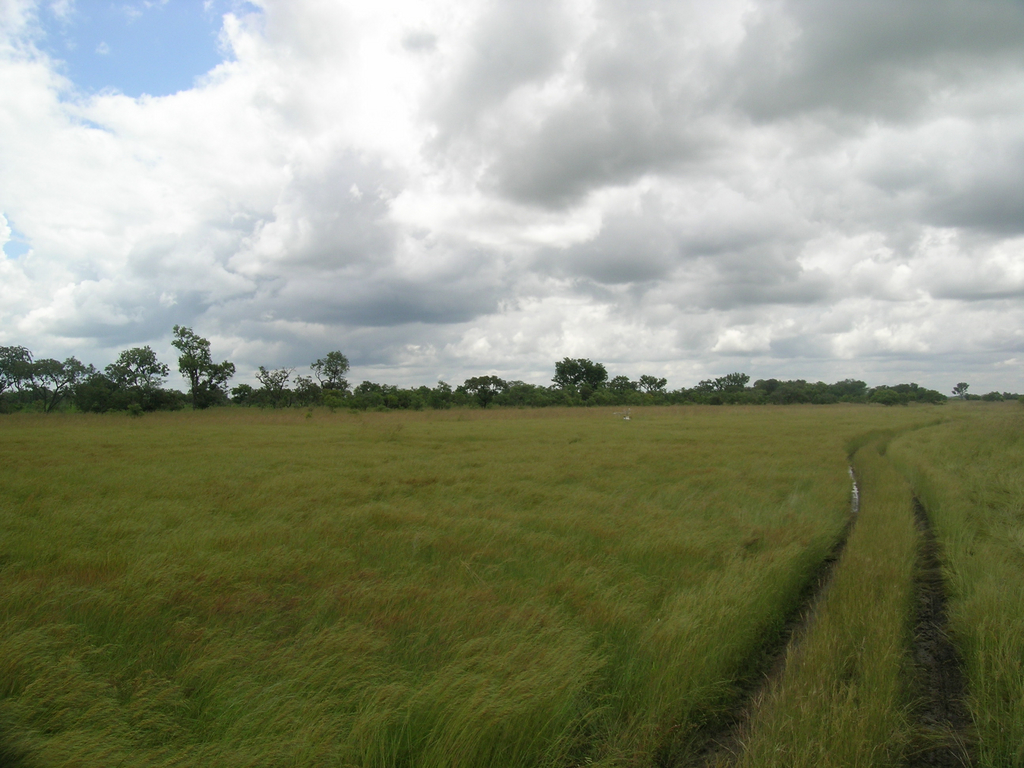
- Bontioli Reserve

- Location in Burkina Faso

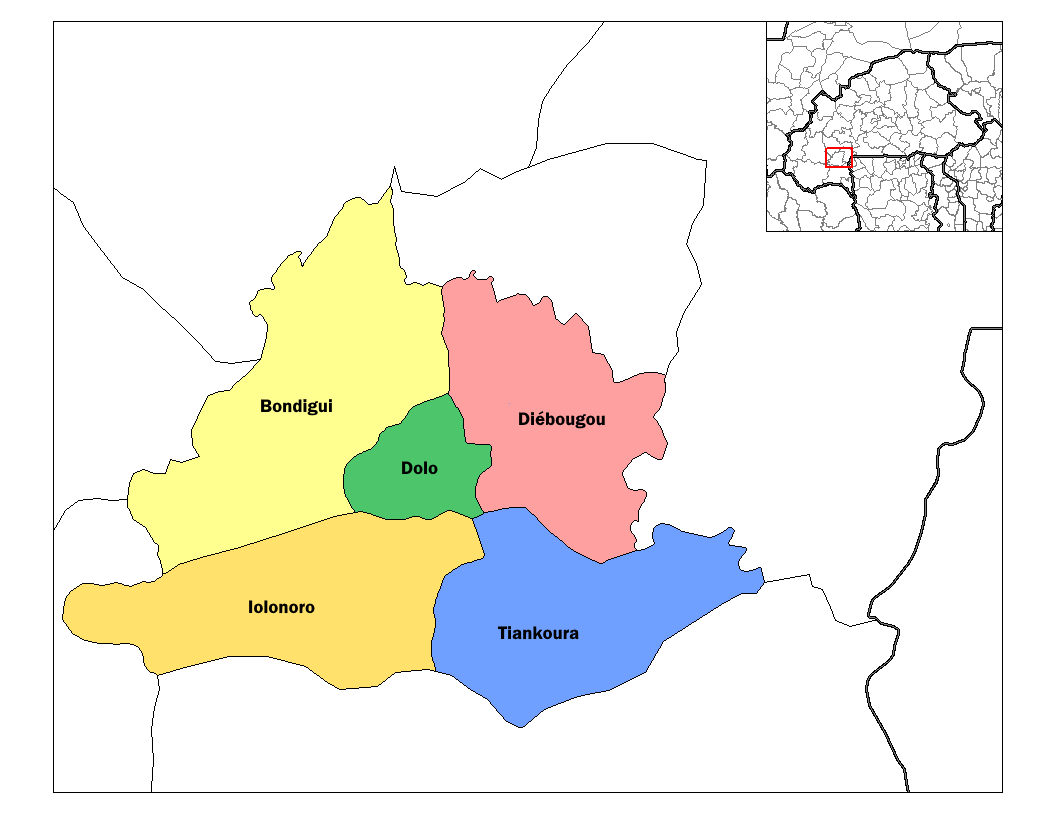
- Provincial map of its departments
- Coordinates: 10°50′N 3°25′W
- Country: Burkina Faso
- Region: Sud-Ouest Region
- Capital: Diébougou

Area
  - Province: 2,815 km^{2} (1,087 sq mi)

Population (2019 census)
  - Province: 153,606
  - Density: 54.57/km^{2} (141.3/sq mi)
  - Urban: 25,688
- Time zone: UTC+0 (GMT 0)

Bougouriba is one of the 45 provinces of Burkina Faso and is in Sud-Ouest Region. In 2019 the population of Bougouriba was 153,606. The capital of Bougouriba is Diébougou. The 127 km^{2} Bontioli Reserve is located in the province.

Bougouriba is divided into 5 departments:

The Departments of Bougouriba
Department	Capital	Population (Census 2006)
Bondigui Department	Bondigui	18,782
Diébougou Department	Diébougou	41,348
Dolo Department	Dolo	8,733
Iolonioro Department	Iiolonioro	20,677
Tiankoura Department	Tiankoura	12,967

See also:

- Regions of Burkina Faso
- Provinces of Burkina Faso
- Communes of Burkina Faso
