= Djôrô Region =

Region of Burkina Faso

Djôrô
- Region
- Location in Burkina Faso
- Coordinates: 10°30′N 3°15′W
- Country: Burkina Faso
- Capital: Gaoua

Area
  - Region: 16,153 km^{2} (6,237 sq mi)

Population (2019 census)
  - Region: 874,030
  - Density: 54.109/km^{2} (140.14/sq mi)
  - Urban: 114,799
- Time zone: UTC+0 (GMT 0)
- HDI (2017): 0.346 low · 11th

The Djôrô Region, formerly known as Sud-Ouest ([syd.wɛst], "Southwest") is one of Burkina Faso's administrative regions. It was created on July 2, 2001 and had a population of 874,030 in 2019. It covers an area of 16,153 km^{2}. The region's capital is Gaoua. Four provinces make up the region: Bougouriba, Ioba, Noumbiel, and Poni.

As of 2019, the population of the region was 874,030 with 51.7% females. The population in the region was 4.26% of the total population of the country. The child mortality rate was 98, infant mortality rate was 107 and the mortality of children under five was 195. As of 2007, the literacy rate in the region was 18.1%, compared to a national average of 28.3%. The coverage of cereal need compared to the total production of the region was 156%.

== Geography ==
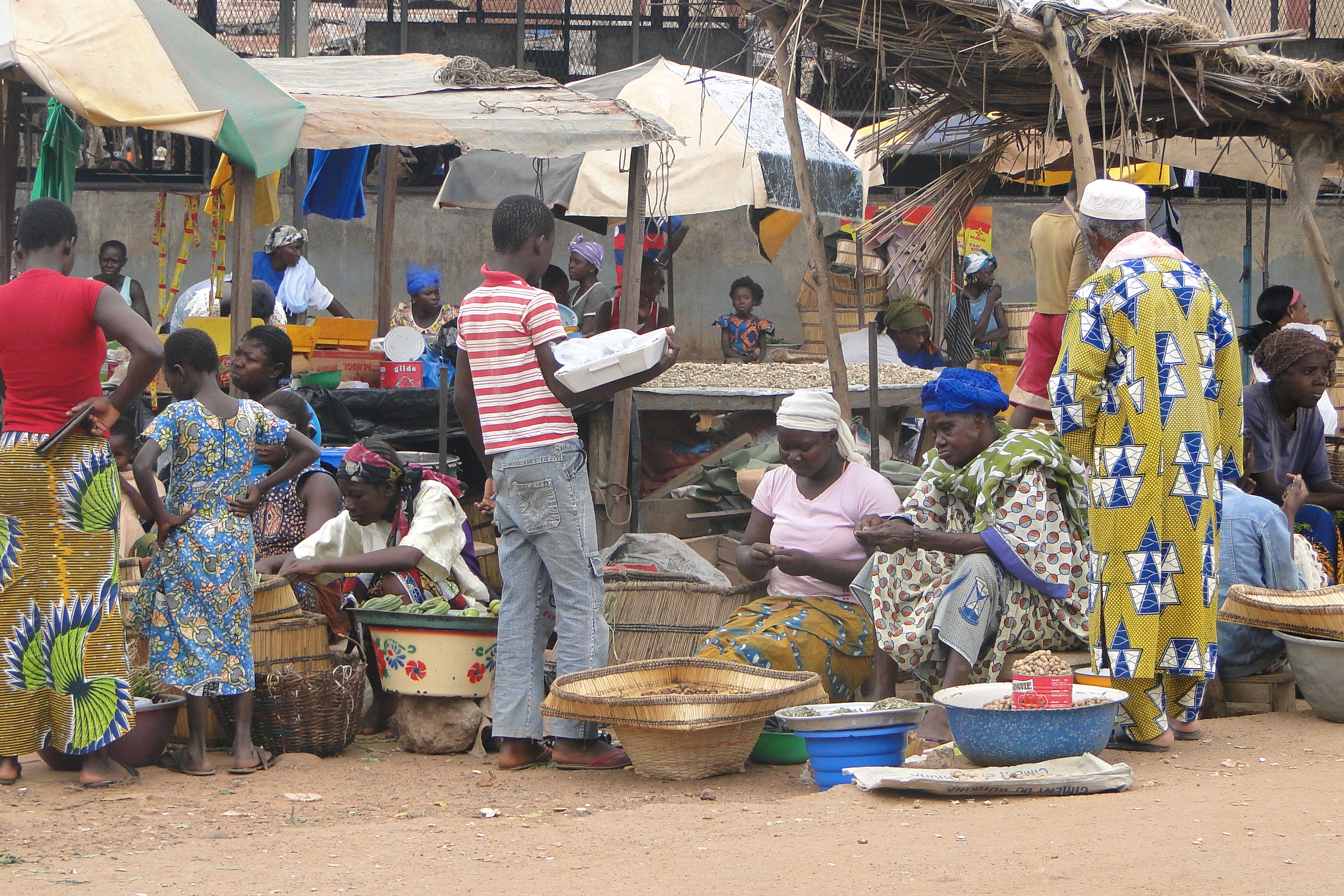
Market in the region

Most of Burkino Faso is a wide plateau formed by riverine systems and is called falaise de Banfora. There are three major rivers, the Red Volta, Black Volta and White Volta, which cut through different valleys. The climate is generally hot, with unreliable rains across different seasons. Gold and quartz are common minerals found across the country, while manganese deposits are also common. The dry season is usually from October to May and rains are common during the wet season from June to September. The soil texture is porous and hence the yield is also poor. The average elevation is around 200 m (660 ft) to 300 m (980 ft) above mean sea level. Among West African countries, Burkino Faso has the largest elephant population and the country is replete with game reserves. The southern regions are more tropical in nature and have Savannah and forests. The principal river is the Black Volta, that originates in the southern region and drains into Ghana. The areas near the rivers usually have flies like tsetse and similium, which are carriers of sleep sickness and river blindness. The average rainfall in the region is around 100 cm (39 in) compared to northern regions that receive only 25 cm (9.8 in) rainfall.

== Demographics ==
Historical population
Year	Pop.	±% p.a.
1985	441,525	—
1996	485,313	+0.86%
2006	620,767	+2.49%
2019	874,030	+2.67%

As of 2019, the population of the region was 874,030 with 51.7% females. The population in the region was 4.26% of the total population of the country. The child mortality rate was 98, infant mortality rate was 107 and the mortality of children under five was 195. As of 2007, among the working population, there were 59.80% employees, 31.20% under employed, 9.00% inactive people, 9% not working and 0.00% unemployed people in the region.

== Economy ==
As of 2007, there were 495.4 km (307.8 mi) of highways, 274 km (170 mi) of regional roads and 337.6 km (209.8 mi) of county roads. The first set of car traffic was 21, first set of two-wheeler traffic was 1,090 and the total classified road network was 1,107. The total corn produced during 2015 was 102,426 tonnes, cotton was 46,175 tonnes, cowpea was 27,504 tonnes, ground nut was 17,780 tonnes, millet was 44,400 tonnes, rice was 13,943 tonnes and sorghum was 119,291 tonnes. The coverage of cereal need compared to the total production of the region was 156.00 per cent. As of 2007, the literacy rate in the region was 18.1 per cent, compared to a national average of 28.3 per cent. The gross primary enrolment was 68.8 per cent, pos-primary was 27 per cent and gross secondary school enrolment was 7.1. There were 121 boys and 66 girls enrolled in the primary and post-secondary level. There were 5 teachers in primary & post-secondary level, while there were 370 teachers in post-primary and post-secondary level.

== Administration ==
Province	Capital	2006
Bougouriba Province	Diébougou	102,507
Ioba Province	Dano	197,186
Noumbiel Province	Batié	69,992
Poni Province	Gaoua	254,371

Burkina Faso gained independence from France in 1960. It was originally called Upper Volta. There have been military coups till 1983 when Captain Thomas Sankara took control and implemented radical left wing policies. He was ousted by Blaise Compaore, who continued for 27 years till 2014, when a popular uprising ended his rule. As per Law No.40/98/AN in 1998, Burkina Faso adhered to decentralization to provide administrative and financial autonomy to local communities. There are 13 administrative regions, each governed by a Governor. The regions are subdivided into 45 provinces, which are further subdivided into 351 communes. The communes may be urban or rural and are interchangeable. There are other administrative entities like department and village. An urban commune has typically 10,000 people under it. If any commune is not able to get 75 per cent of its planned budget in revenues for 3 years, the autonomy is taken off. The communes are administered by elected Mayors. The communes are stipulated to develop economic, social and cultural values of its citizens. A commune has financial autonomy and can interact with other communes, government agencies or international entities.
