= List of airports in Western Australia =

This is a list of airports in the Australian state of Western Australia.

== List of airports ==
The list is sorted by the name of the community served, click the sort buttons in the table header to switch listing order. Airports named in italics are Designated International Airports, even if they have limited or no scheduled international services.

Community	Airport name	Type	ICAO	IATA	Coordinates
Albany	Albany Airport	Public	YABA	ALH	34°56′36″S 117°48′32″E
Anjo Peninsula	Mungalalu Truscott Airbase	Private	YTST	TTX	14°05′23″S 126°22′51″E
Argyle Downs	Argyle Downs Airport	Private		AGY	16°21′S 128°45′E
Balgo	Balgo Hill Airport	Public	YBGO	BQW	20°08′54″S 127°58′24″E
Barimunya	Barimunya Airport	Private	YBRY	BYP	22°40′26″S 119°09′58″E
Barrow Island	Barrow Island Airport	Private	YBWX	BWB	20°51′57″S 115°24′17″E
Leinster	Bellevue Airport	Private	YBLU		27°36′46″S 120°35′38″E
Brockman 2 mine	Brockman Airport	Private	YBKM		22°23′18″S 117°22′18″E
Brockman 4 mine	Boolgeeda Airport	Private	YBGD	OCM	22°32′24″S 117°16′30″E
Bronzewing Gold Mine	Bronzewing Airport	Private	YBWG		27°21′56″S 121°02′09″E
Broome	Broome International Airport	Public	YBRM	BME	17°56′59″S 122°13′40″E
Bullsbrook, Perth	RAAF Base Pearce	Military	YPEA		31°40′04″S 116°00′54″E
Bunbury	Bunbury Airport	Public	YBUN	BUY	33°22′41″S 115°40′37″E
Busselton	Busselton Margaret River Airport	Public	YBLN	BQB	33°41′14″S 115°24′01″E
Carnarvon	Carnarvon Airport	Public	YCAR	CVQ	24°52′50″S 113°40′20″E
Christmas Creek mine	Graeme Rowley Aerodrome	Private	YCHK		22°21′15″S 119°38′40″E
Christmas Creek Station	Christmas Creek Airport	Public	YCRK	CXQ	18°53′S 125°55′E
Cloud Break mine	Fortescue Dave Forrest Airport	Private	YFDF		22°17′31″S 119°26′14″E
Coondewanna	Coondewanna Airport	Private	YCWA	CJF	22°58′00″S 118°48′08″E
Coolawanyah Station	Coolawanyah Station Airport	Private	YCWY	COY	21°47′39″S 117°45′33″E
Cue	Cue Airport	Public	YCUE	CUY	27°26′48″S 117°55′06″E
Cunderdin	Cunderdin Airport	Public	YCUN		31°37′20″S 117°13′00″E
Darlot-Centenary Gold Mine	Darlot Airport	Private	YDLO		27°52′25″S 121°16′18″E
Denham	Shark Bay Airport	Public	YSHK	MJK	25°53′36″S 113°34′36″E
Derby	Derby Airport	Public	YDBY	DRB	17°22′12″S 123°39′38″E
Derby	RAAF Base Curtin	Military/Public	YCIN	DCN	17°34′53″S 123°49′42″E
Eliwana Mine	Eliwana Airport	Private	YEWA	WHB	22°25′41″S 116°53′12″E
Eucla	Eucla Airport	Public	YECL	EUC	31°42′0″S 128°52′59″E
Exmouth	RAAF Base Learmonth	Military/Public	YPLM	LEA	22°14′09″S 114°05′19″E
Fitzroy Crossing	Fitzroy Crossing Airport	Public	YFTZ	FIZ	18°10′55″S 125°33′31″E
Forrest	Forrest Airport	Public	YFRT	FOS	30°50′18″S 128°06′54″E
Forrestania	Forrestania Airport	Private	YFTA		32°34′42″S 119°42′24″E
Garden Island	HMAS Stirling	Military	YGAD		32°14′30″S 115°41′00″E
Geraldton	Geraldton Airport	Public	YGEL	GET	28°47′46″S 114°42′27″E
Gibson	Esperance Airport	Public	YESP	EPR	33°41′04″S 121°49′22″E
Gingin	RAAF Gingin	Military	YGIG		31°27′54″S 115°51′48″E
Golden Grove Mine	Golden Grove Airport	Private	YGGE		28°45′54″S 116°58′18″E
Granny Smith Gold Mine	Granny Smith Airport	Private	YGRS		28°45′48″S 122°26′18″E
Halls Creek	Halls Creek Airport	Public	YHLC	HCQ	18°14′02″S 127°40′11″E
Jandakot, Perth	Jandakot Airport	Public	YPJT	JAD	32°05′51″S 115°52′52″E
Jundee Gold Mine	Jundee Airport	Private	YJUN		26°25′18″S 120°34′36″E
Jurien Bay	Jurien Bay Airport	Public	YJNB	JUR	30°18′12″S 115°03′18″E
Kalbarri	Kalbarri Airport	Public	YKBR	KAX	27°41′30″S 114°15′36″E
Kalgoorlie	Kalgoorlie-Boulder Airport	Public	YPKG	KGI	30°47′22″S 121°27′42″E
Kambalda	Kambalda Airport	Private	YKBL		31°11′24″S 121°35′54″E
Karara	Karara Airport	Private	YKAR		29°13′00″S 116°41′12″E
Karratha	Karratha Airport	Public	YPKA	KTA	20°42′44″S 116°46′24″E
Katanning	Katanning Airport	Public	YKNG		33°41′58″S 117°39′18″E
Kununurra	East Kimberley Regional Airport	Public	YPKU	KNX	15°46′41″S 128°42′27″E
Lake Argyle	Argyle Airport	Private	YARG	GYL	16°38′13″S 128°27′05″E
Lake Johnston	Lake Johnston Airport	Private	YLJN		32°19′06″S 120°33′18″E
Laverton	Laverton Airport	Public	YLTN	LVO	28°36′49″S 122°25′26″E
Lawlers Gold Mine	Lawlers Airport	Private	YLAW		28°05′24″S 120°32′24″E
Leinster	Leinster Airport	Public	YLST	LER	27°50′36″S 120°42′12″E
Leonora	Leonora Airport	Public	YLEO	LNO	28°52′41″S 121°18′53″E
Mandurah	Murray Field Airport	Private	YMUL		32°30′37″S 115°50′00″E
Manjimup	Manjimup Airport	Public	YMJM		34°15′55″S 116°08′25″E
Margaret River	Margaret River Airport	Public	YMGT		33°55′48″S 115°06′00″E
Meekatharra	Meekatharra Airport	Public	YMEK	MKR	26°36′42″S 118°32′52″E
Merredin	Merredin Airport	Private	YMDN		31°31′40″S 118°19′20″E
Morawa	Morawa Airport	Public	YMRW		29°12′05″S 116°01′19″E
Mount Keith Mine	Mount Keith Airport	Private	YMNE	WME	27°17′11″S 120°33′17″E
Mount Magnet	Mount Magnet Airport	Public	YMOG	MMG	28°06′58″S 117°50′30″E
Mulan Community	Lake Gregory Airport	Public		LGE	20°06′32″S 127°37′07″E
Mullewa	Mullewa Airport	Public	YMWA	MXU	28°28′26″S 115°31′04″E
Murrin Murrin Nickel Mine	Murrin Murrin Airport	Private	YMMI		28°42′19″S 121°53′26″E
Newman	Newman Airport	Public	YNWN	ZNE	23°25′04″S 119°48′10″E
Nifty Copper Mine	Nifty Airport	Private	YCNF	NIF	21°40′25″S 121°35′41″E
Norseman	Norseman Airport	Public	YNSM		32°12′34″S 121°45′16″E
Onslow	Onslow Airport	Public	YOLW	ONS	21°40′06″S 115°06′47″E
Paraburdoo	Paraburdoo Airport	Public	YPBO	PBO	23°10′17″S 117°44′44″E
Perth Airport, Perth	Perth Airport	Public	YPPH	PER	31°56′25″S 115°58′01″E
Plutonic Gold Mine	Plutonic Airport	Private	YPLU		25°18′48″S 119°25′24″E
Port Hedland	Port Hedland International Airport	Public	YPPD	PHE	20°22′40″S 118°37′35″E
Ravensthorpe	Ravensthorpe Airport	Public	YNRV	RVT	33°47′50″S 120°12′29″E
Rottnest Island	Rottnest Island Airport	Public	YRTI	RTS	32°00′24″S 115°32′23″E
Roy Hill Mine	Ginbata Airport	Private	YGIA	GBW	23°33′28″S 120°02′53″E
Shay Gap	Shay Gap Airport	Private	YSHG		20°25′30″S 120°08′24″E
Karijini National Park	Solomon Airport	Public	YSOL	SLJ	22°15′19″S 117°45′43″E
Southern Cross	Southern Cross Airport	Private	YSCR		31°14′25″S 119°21′35″E
Springvale	Springvale Airport	Public		ZVG	17°47′13″S 127°40′12″E
Sunrise Dam Gold Mine	Sunrise Dam Airport	Private	YSRD		29°05′54″S 122°27′18″E
Telfer Mine	Telfer Airport	Private	YTEF		21°42′54″S 122°13′43″E
Tom Price	Tom Price Airport	Public	YTMP	TPR	22°44′46″S 117°52′08″E
Tropicana Gold Mine	Tropicana Airport	Private	YTRA		29°11′10″S 124°32′51″E
Troughton Island	Troughton Island Airport	Private	YTTI		13°45′06″S 126°08′54″E
Warakurna Community	Giles Airport	Public	YGLS		25°02′37″S 128°17′46″E
Warburton	Warburton Airport	Public	YWBR		26°07′42″S 126°35′00″E
West Angelas Mine	West Angelas Airport	Private	YANG	WLP	23°08′10″S 118°42′40″E
Wiluna	Wiluna Airport	Public	YWLU	WUN	26°37′48″S 120°13′12″E
Windarling Mine	Windarling Airport	Private	YWDG		30°01′54″S 119°23′24″E
Woodie Woodie Mine	Woodie Woodie Airport	Private	YWWI	WWI	21°38′42″S 121°11′30″E
Wyndham	Wyndham Airport	Public	YWYM	WYN	15°30′41″S 128°09′11″E

== Defunct airports ==
Community	Airport name	Type	ICAO	IATA	Coordinates
Caversham, Perth	Caversham Airfield	Military			31°50′16″S 115°58′27″E
Corunna Downs	Corunna Downs Airfield	Military			21°27′52″S 119°50′50″E
Crawley	Matilda Bay Flying Boat Base	Military			31°59′06″S 115°49′26″E
Maylands, Perth	Maylands Airport	Public			31°57′00″S 115°54′18″E
Langley Park, Perth	Langley Park Airstrip	Public	YPLP		31°57′41″S 115°52′07″E
Mooliabeenee	Mooliabeenee Airport	Military			31°20′16″S 116°00′55″E
Mount Claremont	West Subiaco Aerodrome	Private			31°57′14″S 115°47′19″E
Crawley	Qantas Flying Boat Base	Public			31°59′14″S 115°49′13″E

== See also ==
- List of airports in Perth
- List of airports in Australia
