= Lake Gregory Airport =

Airport in Western Australia

- IATA: LGE; ICAO: none

Summary
- Airport type: Public
- Location: Mulan
- Coordinates: 20°06′32″S 127°37′07″E

Map
- Location in Western Australia
- Source: DAFIF

Lake Gregory – Mulan Airport (IATA: LGE) is an airport located in Mulan, serving Lake Gregory region, Western Australia.

== See also ==
- List of airports in Western Australia
- Aviation transport in Australia
