= Bronzewing Airport =

Airport in Western Australia

- IATA: none; ICAO: YBWG

Summary
- Airport type: Private
- Operator: Newmont Yandal Operations
- Location: Bronzewing Gold Mine
- Elevation AMSL: 1,645 ft / 501 m
- Coordinates: 27°21′56″S 121°02′09″E

Map
- Location in Western Australia

Runways
Direction	Length		Surface
Direction	m	ft	Surface
09/27	2,040	6,693	Gravel/asphalt
- Sources: Australian AIP and aerodrome chart

Bronzewing Airport (ICAO: YBWG) is located at Bronzewing Gold Mine, Western Australia.

== See also ==
- List of airports in Western Australia
- Aviation transport in Australia
