= Shay Gap Airport =

Airport in Western Australia

- IATA: SGP; ICAO: YSHG

Summary
- Airport type: Private
- Operator: BHP
- Location: Shay Gap, Western Australia
- Elevation AMSL: 565 ft / 172 m
- Coordinates: 20°25′30″S 120°08′24″E

Map
- Location in Western Australia

Runways
Direction	Length		Surface
Direction	m	ft	Surface
10/28	1,911	6,270	Gravel
- Sources: Australian AIP

Shay Gap Airport (IATA: SGP, ICAO: YSHG) is located near Shay Gap, in the Pilbara region of Western Australia.

== See also ==
- List of airports in Western Australia
- Transport in Australia § Aviation
