= Wyndham Airport =

- IATA: WYN; ICAO: YWYM

Summary
- Airport type: Public
- Operator: Shire of Wyndham East-Kimberley
- Location: Wyndham, Western Australia
- Elevation AMSL: 14 ft (4.3 m)
- Coordinates: 15°30′22″S 128°09′06″E

Map
- Location in Western Australia

Runways
Direction	Length		Surface
Direction	m	ft	Surface
12/30	1,607	5,272	Sealed
- Sources: Australian AIP and aerodrome chart

Wyndham Airport (IATA: WYN, ICAO: YWYM) is located 3 nautical miles (5.6 km; 3.5 mi) southeast of Wyndham, Western Australia.

== See also ==
- List of airports in Western Australia
- Transport in Australia § Aviation
