= Sunrise Dam Airport =

Airport in the Goldfields region of Western Australia

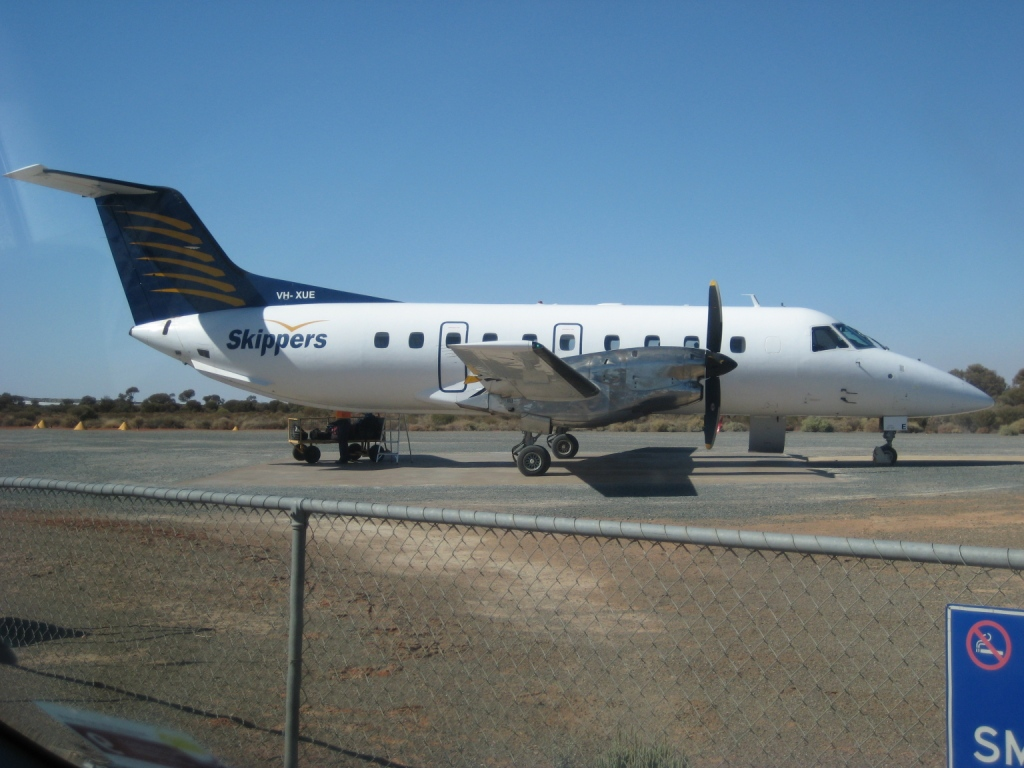
- A Skippers Aviation Brasilia at Sunrise Dam Airport in 2009.
- IATA: none; ICAO: YSRD

Summary
- Airport type: Private
- Operator: Anglogold Ashanti Australia Ltd
- Location: Sunrise Dam Gold Mine
- Elevation AMSL: 1,350 ft / 411 m
- Coordinates: 29°05′54″S 122°27′18″E

Map
- Location in Western Australia

Runways
Direction	Length		Surface
Direction	m	ft	Surface
08/26	1,951	6,401	tarmac
- Sources: Australian AIP

Sunrise Dam Airport (ICAO: YSRD) is located at the Sunrise Dam Gold Mine, Western Australia.

The airport is serviced by Skippers Aviation charter flights from Perth Airport for the Sunrise Dam Gold Mine.

== See also ==
- List of airports in Western Australia
- Aviation transport in Australia
