= SQC =

SQC may refer to:

- Southern Cross Airport (Western Australia) (IATA airport code: SQC), Southern Cross, Western Australia, Australia
- Singapore Airlines Cargo (ICAO airline code: SQC)
- Scottish Qualifications Certificate, the main educational qualification awarded to students in secondary, further, and, vocational education.
- Statistical Quality Control
- Standard on Quality Control of the Institute of Chartered Accountants of India
- Student Quality Circle, a type of quality circle

== See also ==
- "SQC", aircraft prefix used by the Waco Aircraft Company
- "SQC", sonar system prefix used by naval weaponry of the People's Liberation Army Navy
