= KNI =

KNI can refer to:

- KNI A/S or Greenland Trade, a state-owned retail company in Greenland
- Streaming SIMD Extensions
- Katanning Airport, IATA airport code "KNI"
