= Telfer Airport =

Airport in the Pilbara region of Western Australia

- IATA: TEF; ICAO: YTEF

Summary
- Airport type: Private
- Operator: Newcrest
- Location: Telfer Mine
- Elevation AMSL: 970 ft (300 m)
- Coordinates: 21°42′54″S 122°13′43″E

Map
- Location in Western Australia

Runways
| Direction | Length | | Surface |
| Direction | m | ft | Surface |
|---|---|---|---|
| 12/30 | 2,000 | 6,562 |
- Sources: Australian AIP and aerodrome chart

Telfer Airport (IATA: TEF, ICAO: YTEF) is located at Telfer Mine, in the Pilbara region of Western Australia.

== Airlines and destinations ==
| Airlines | Destinations |
|---|---|
| Alliance Airlines | Charter:^{1} Melbourne–Essendon, Perth |

Notes

- ^1 Fly-in fly-out (FIFO) private charter operations only.

== See also ==
- List of airports in Western Australia
- Aviation transport in Australia
