= Granny Smith Airport =

Airport in Western Australia

- IATA: none; ICAO: YGRS

Summary
- Airport type: Private
- Operator: Barrick (Granny Smith) Pty Ltd
- Location: Granny Smith Gold Mine
- Elevation AMSL: 1,457 ft / 444 m
- Coordinates: 28°45′48″S 122°26′18″E

Map
- Location in Western Australia

Runways
Direction	Length		Surface
Direction	m	ft	Surface
16/34	1,900	6,234	Gravel
- Sources: Australian AIP

Granny Smith Airport (ICAO: YGRS) serves Granny Smith Gold Mine, Western Australia.

== See also ==
- List of airports in Western Australia
- Aviation transport in Australia
