= Jurien Bay Airport =

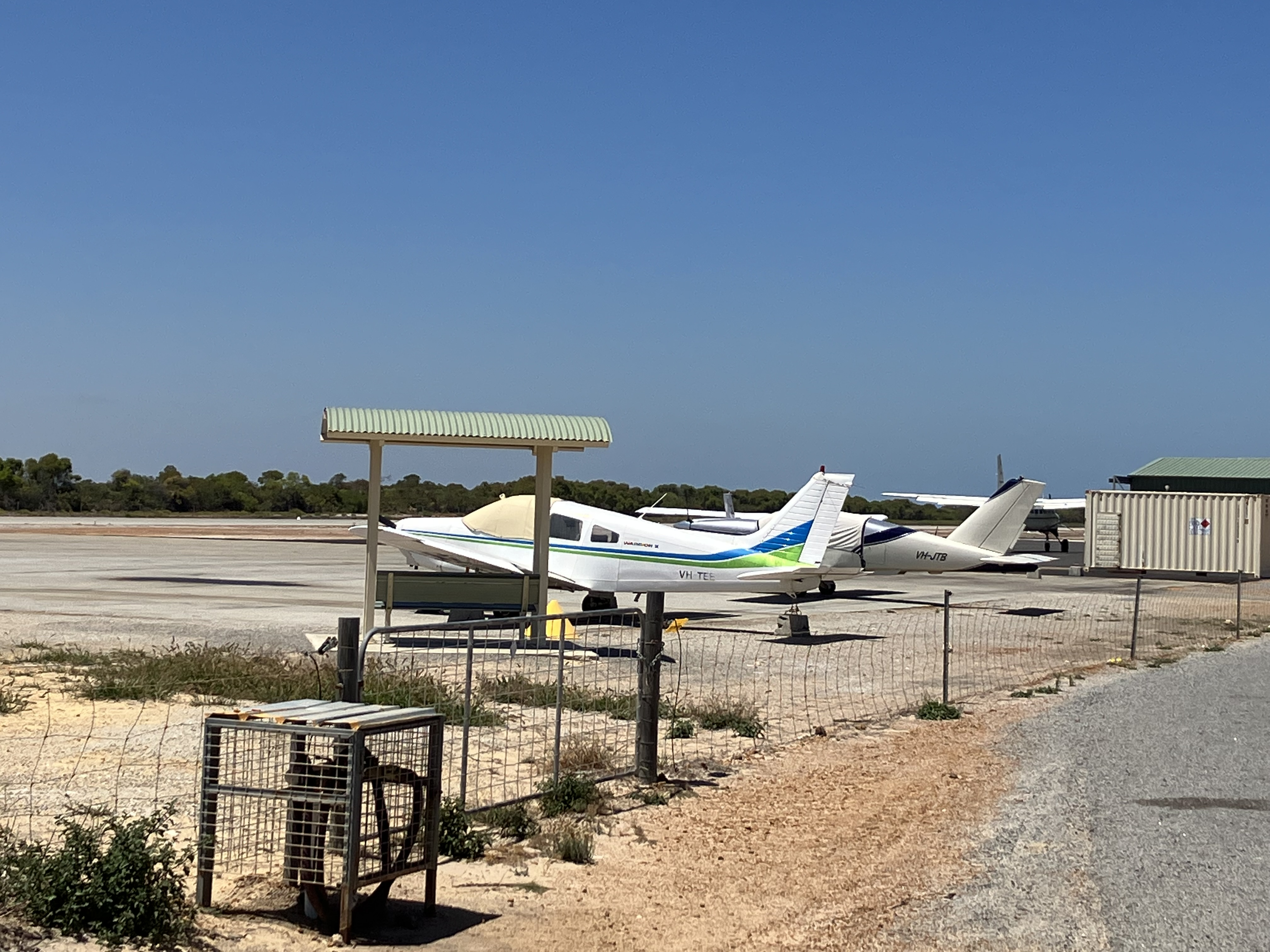
- Jurien Bay Airport, 2023
- IATA: JUR; ICAO: YJNB

Summary
- Airport type: Public
- Operator: Dandaragan Shire Council
- Location: Jurien Bay, Western Australia, Australia
- Elevation AMSL: 10 ft / 3 m
- Coordinates: 30°18′12″S 115°03′18″E

Map
- Location in Western Australia

Runways
Direction	Length		Surface
Direction	m	ft	Surface
02/20	485	1,590
- Sources: AIP

Jurien Bay Airport (IATA: JUR, ICAO: YJNB) is an airport in Jurien Bay, Western Australia.

== See also ==
- List of airports in Western Australia
- Transport in Australia § Aviation
