= Lake Johnston Airport =

Airport in Western Australia

- IATA: none; ICAO: YLJN

Summary
- Airport type: Private
- Operator: Norilsk Nickel Australia Pty Ltd
- Location: Lake Johnston
- Elevation AMSL: 1,047 ft / 319 m
- Coordinates: 32°19′10″S 120°33′07″E

Map
- Location in Western Australia

Runways
Direction	Length		Surface
Direction	m	ft	Surface
05/23	1,400	4,593	Gravel
- Sources: Australian AIP

Lake Johnston Airport (ICAO: YLJN) is located near Lake Johnston, Western Australia.

== See also ==
- List of airports in Western Australia
- Transport in Australia § Aviation
