= Solomon Airport =

Airport in Western Australia

- IATA: SLJ; ICAO: YSOL

Summary
- Airport type: Public
- Location: Solomon, Western Australia
- Coordinates: 22°15′24″S 117°50′57″E

Map
- Location of the airport in Western Australia

Runways
Direction	Length		Surface
Direction	m	ft	Surface
09/27	2,000	6,562	Concrete
- Sources: Australian AIP

Solomon Airport (IATA: SLJ, ICAO: YSOL) is located 15 kilometres (9 mi) west of the Karijini National Park, Western Australia. The airport services Fortescue's Solomon Hub mines. The company builds a 440 MW solar facility at the airport to power the mines.

== Airlines and destinations ==
Airlines	Destinations
Qantas	Charter: Perth
QantasLink	Charter: Perth

== See also ==
- List of airports in Western Australia
- Aviation transport in Australia
