= Woodie Woodie Airport =

Airport in the Pilbara region of Western Australia

- IATA: WWI; ICAO: YWWI

Summary
- Airport type: Private
- Operator: Consolidated Minerals Pty Ltd
- Location: Woodie Woodie Mine
- Elevation AMSL: 889 ft / 271 m
- Coordinates: 21°38′42″S 121°11′30″E

Map
- Location in Western Australia

Runways
Direction	Length		Surface
Direction	m	ft	Surface
14/32	2,000	6,562	Asphalt
- Sources: Australian AIP

Woodie Woodie Airport (IATA: WWI, ICAO: YWWI) is related to the Woodie Woodie Mine, in the Pilbara region of Western Australia.

== See also ==
- List of airports in Western Australia
- Transport in Australia § Aviation
