= Nifty Airport =

Airport in Western Australia

- IATA: NIF; ICAO: YCNF

Summary
- Airport type: Private
- Operator: Metals X Pty Ltd.
- Location: Nifty Copper Mine
- Elevation AMSL: 968 ft / 295 m
- Coordinates: 21°40′25″S 121°35′41″E

Map
- Location in Western Australia

Runways
Direction	Length		Surface
Direction	m	ft	Surface
12/30	2,039	6,690	Asphalt
- Sources: Australian AIP and aerodrome chart

Nifty Airport or Camp Nifty Airport (IATA: NIF, ICAO: YCNF) is located adjacent to the Nifty Copper Mine, in the Pilbara region of Western Australia.

== See also ==
- List of airports in Western Australia
- Transport in Australia § Aviation
