= Norseman Airport =

- IATA: NSM; ICAO: YNSM

Summary
- Airport type: Public
- Operator: Shire of Dundas
- Location: Norseman, Western Australia
- Elevation AMSL: 863 ft / 263 m
- Coordinates: 32°12′10″S 121°45′30″E

Map
- Location in Western Australia

Runways
Direction	Length		Surface
Direction	m	ft	Surface
01/19	1,512	4,961	Asphalt
04/22	1,040	3,412	Gravel
- Sources: Australian AIP and aerodrome chart

Norseman Airport (IATA: NSM, ICAO: YNSM) is located at Norseman, Western Australia.

== See also ==
- List of airports in Western Australia
- Transport in Australia § Aviation
