= MXU =

MXU may refer to:

- Mullewa Airport (IATA code), Australia
- Media Extension Unit, a SIMD extension for the MIPS computer architecture
