= Golden Grove Airport =

- IATA: none; ICAO: YGGE

Summary
- Airport type: Private
- Operator: Golden Grove Pty Ltd
- Location: Golden Grove Mine
- Elevation AMSL: 1,180 ft / 360 m
- Coordinates: 28°45′54″S 116°58′18″E

Map
- Location in Western Australia

Runways
Direction	Length		Surface
Direction	m	ft	Surface
11/29	1,386	4,547	Asphalt
- Sources: Australian AIP

Golden Grove Airport (ICAO: YGGE) is located at Golden Grove Mine, Western Australia.

== See also ==
- List of airports in Western Australia
- Transport in Australia § Aviation
