= Forrest Airport =

Airport in Western Australia

- IATA: FOS; ICAO: YFRT

Summary
- Airport type: Public
- Operator: Fayburn Pty Ltd.
- Location: Forrest, Western Australia
- Elevation AMSL: 511 ft / 156 m
- Coordinates: 30°50′19″S 128°06′46″E
- Website: http://www.forrestairport.com.au

Map
- Location in Western Australia

Runways
Direction	Length		Surface
Direction	m	ft	Surface
18/36	1,519	4,984	Asphalt
09/27	1,349	4,426	Asphalt
- Sources: Australian AIP and aerodrome chart

Forrest Airport (IATA: FOS, ICAO: YFRT) is an airport located in the hamlet of Forrest, Western Australia. The airport is clearly visible from the Indian Pacific train, which services the Trans-Australian Railway.

== History ==
The airport was built by the Department of Civil Aviation in 1929 as a fuel stop for West Australian Airways which had won a government contract to carry mail between Adelaide and Perth using the de Havilland Hercules. In the 1930s the Douglas airliner Bungana, also known as the mail plane, was a regular visitor on interstate flights.

During World War II it was operated by the Royal Australian Air Force as a transit and fuel stop, and a communications base. and has been the site of various military visits to the location over time.

== Current usage ==
It remains in use as an important stopping place for refuelling short range planes, for the Royal Flying Doctor Service and the Australian Defence Force.

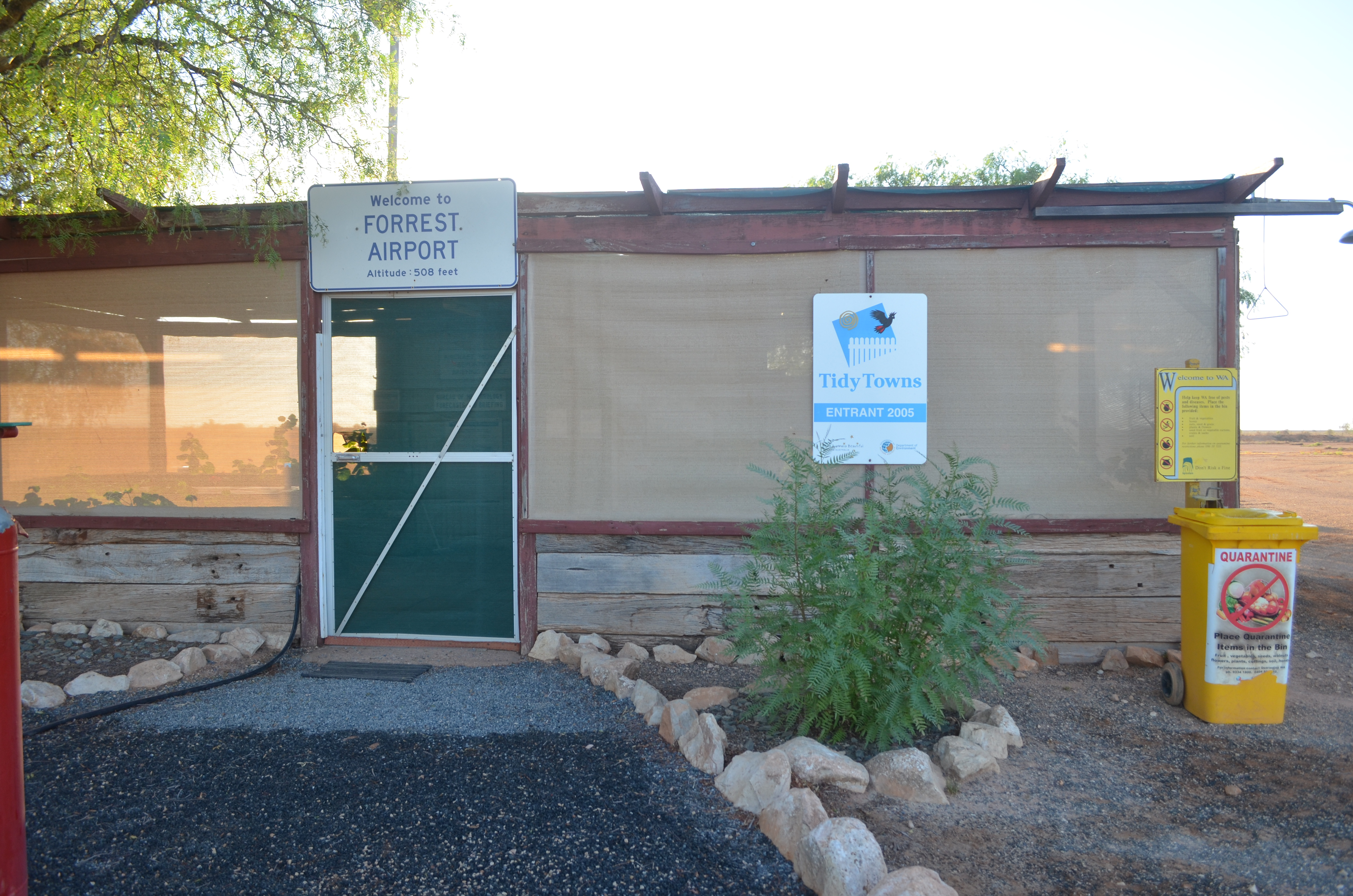
Forrest Airport terminal building

== See also ==
- List of airports in Western Australia
- Aviation transport in Australia
