= WME =

WME may refer to:

- Windows Me
- Windows Media Encoder
- Wireless Multimedia Extensions
- Wintermute Engine, a graphical adventure game engine by Dead:Code software
- William Morris Endeavor, a talent agency conglomerate
- Working Memory Element in the Rete algorithm
- The IATA code for Mount Keith Airport in Western Australia
- Waze Map Editor
- National Rail station code for Woodmansterne railway station in London
