= Mwb =

MWB, MwB, or mwb may mean:

== People ==
- Margaret Wander Bonanno, an American writer

== Organizations ==
- MWB Group Holdings, a property company
- MalWareBytes software Made by Malwarebytes Corporation
- Metropolitan Water Board, London
- Mwb Broadcasting, owners of the KTMX radio station in York, Nebraska, USA
- Musicians without Borders, global education and welfare organization
- MyWikiBiz, a wiki directory
- Ministries Without Borders, an association of evangelical churches.
- Morawa Airport, IATA airport code "MWB"

== Terminology ==
- In whaling, it may refer to a Marine Whaleboat or a Motor Whaleboat
- In mechanics, it may refer to Medium-wheelbase or Mid-wheelbase
- In management literature, it may refer to Must Win Battles, a way of defining and working on an organisations key goals for the year.
- Mwb seismic moment magnitude scale

== Programming ==
- MySQL Workbench, a database management tool
