= KQR =

KQR may refer to:

- Karara Airport (IATA airport code: KQR), Karara, Western Australia, Australia
- Koderma Junction railway station (station code KQR), Jhumri Telaiya, Koderma, Jharkhand, India
- Kimaragang, a dialect of Momogun language (ISO 639 language code: kqr)
