= WRN =

WRN may refer to:

- WRN (gene), responsible for Werner syndrome
- West Runton railway station (UK railway station code)
- WRN Broadcast, formerly World Radio Network, an international broadcasting services company
- Polish Socialist Party - Freedom, Equality, Independence (Polska Partia Socjalistyczna - Wolność, Równość, Niepodległość, PPS-WRN)
- Is not singular of WRNs: Women's Royal Naval Service, the former women's branch of the British Royal Navy
- Windarling Airport, IATA airport code "WRN"
