= Darlot Airport =

Airport in Western Australia

- IATA: none; ICAO: YDLO

Summary
- Airport type: Private
- Operator: Barrick (Darlot) NL
- Location: Darlot-Centenary Gold Mine
- Elevation AMSL: 1,513 ft / 461 m
- Coordinates: 27°52′25″S 121°16′18″E

Map
- Location in Western Australia

Runways
Direction	Length		Surface
Direction	m	ft	Surface
14/32	1,969	6,460
- Sources: Australian AIP and aerodrome chart

Darlot Airport (ICAO: YDLO) is located at the Darlot-Centenary Gold Mine, Western Australia.

== See also ==
- List of airports in Western Australia
- Transport in Australia § Aviation
