= Eucla Airport =

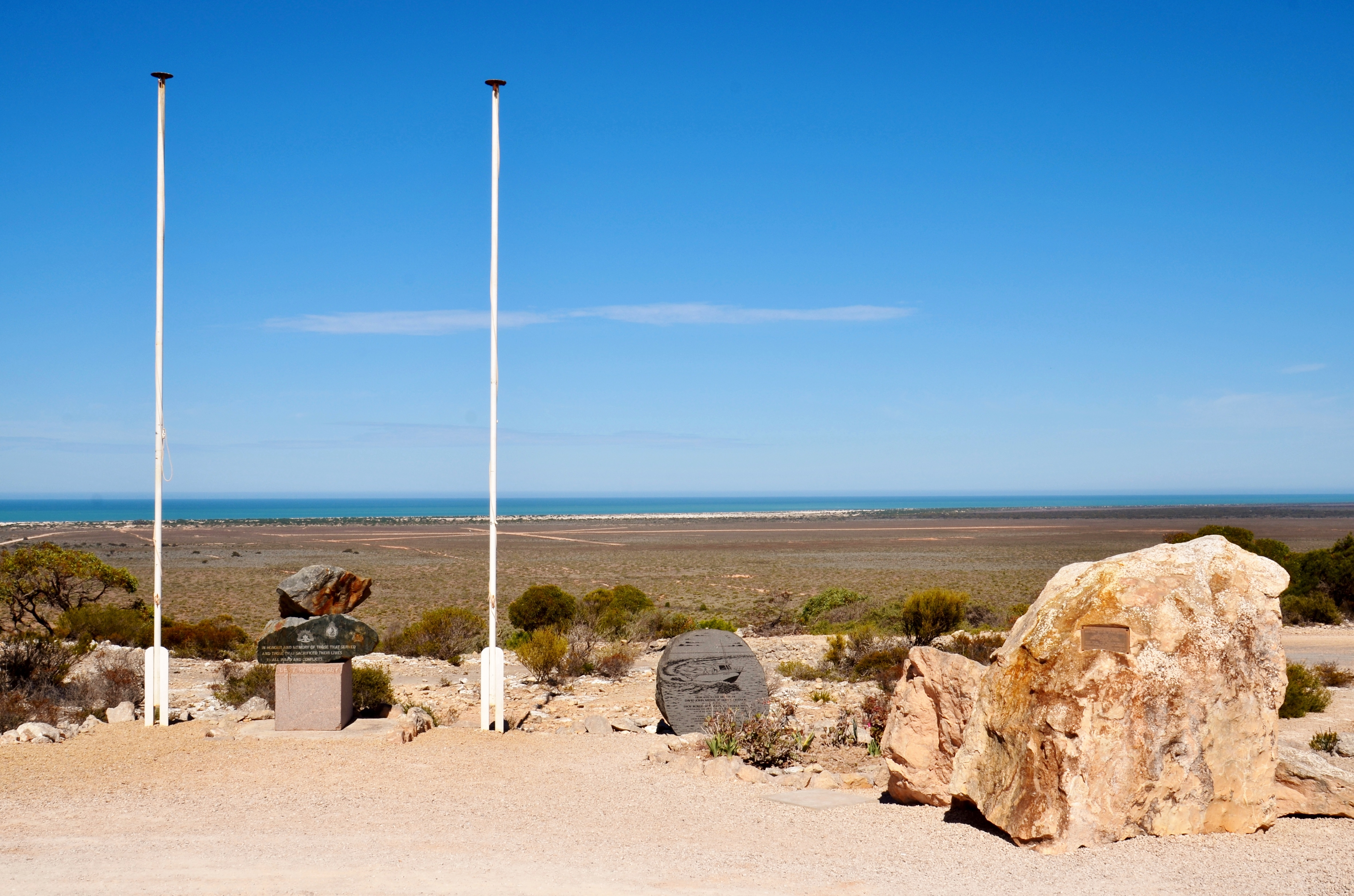
- Eucla War Memorial, with the Airport runways and the Great Australian Bight behind it
- IATA: EUC; ICAO: YECL

Summary
- Airport type: Public
- Location: Eucla, Western Australia
- Coordinates: 31°42′26″S 128°52′29″E

Map
- Location in Western Australia

Runways
Direction	Length		Surface
Direction	m	ft	Surface
08/26	1,369	4,491
- Sources: Airport Guide

Eucla Airport is an airstrip in Eucla, Western Australia. It has one runway that is 1369 m long. It has a Traffic Pattern Altitude of 305 m. It is mostly used by the Royal Flying Doctor Service of Australia, who completed 84 medical evacuations from the airstrip between 2009 and 2014. There is an ongoing campaign to upgrade the flood-prone airstrip. When it is unusable, aircraft must land on the nearby Eyre Highway.

== See also ==
- List of airports in Western Australia
- Aviation transport in Australia
