= TPR =

TPR may refer to:

== Politics and government ==
- Third Polish Republic (Polish: III Rzeczpospolita Polska)

== Businesses and organisations ==
- Tapestry, Inc., an American clothing company (NYSE stock ticker: TPR)
- Texas Public Radio
- The Pensions Regulator, UK
- The Princeton Review, a US educational company

== Journals ==
- Town Planning Review, Liverpool University Press

== Science and technology ==
=== Medicine ===
- Tetratricopeptide repeat, a degenerate protein sequence
- Total peripheral resistance, vascular resistance
- Translocated promoter region, part of a protein

=== Other uses in science and technology ===
- True positive rate, a statistical measure
- Thermoplastic elastomer, also called thermoplastic rubber

== Recreation ==
- Tarbes Pyrénées Rugby, a French rugby club
- Tournament performance rating, in chess

== Other uses ==
- Thermoplastic rubber
- Total physical response, a language teaching method
- Tom Price Airport, IATA airport code
- Trooper (rank) (Tpr), a military and police rank
- Tuvan People's Republic (1921–44)
- Italian Heavy Draft (Tiro Pesante Rapido) horse breed
