= Warburton Airport =

Airport in Western Australia

- IATA: none; ICAO: YWBR

Summary
- Operator: Warburton Community
- Location: Warburton, Western Australia
- Elevation AMSL: 1,510 ft / 460 m
- Coordinates: 26°07′42″S 126°35′00″E

Map
- Location in Western Australia

Runways
Direction	Length		Surface
Direction	m	ft	Surface
18/36	1,590	5,217
- Sources: Australian AIP and aerodrome chart

Warburton Airport (ICAO: YWBR) is a public-use airport located in the remote town of Warburton, Western Australia.

== See also ==
- List of airports in Western Australia
- Transport in Australia § Aviation
