= Plutonic Airport =

- IATA: QPL; ICAO: YPLU

Summary
- Airport type: Private
- Owner: Barrick Gold of Australia
- Location: Plutonic Gold Mine
- Elevation AMSL: 1,896 ft / 578 m
- Coordinates: 25°18′59″S 119°25′29″E

Map
- Location in Western Australia

Runways
Direction	Length		Surface
Direction	m	ft	Surface
07/25	2,071	6,795	Gravel
- Sources: Australian AIP

Plutonic Airport (ICAO: YPLU) serves the Plutonic Gold Mine, Western Australia.

The airport is serviced by Cobham Aviation charter flights from Perth Airport for the Plutonic Gold Mine.

== See also ==
- List of airports in Western Australia
- Aviation transport in Australia
