= Lawlers Airport =

Airport in Western Australia

- IATA: none; ICAO: YLAW

Summary
- Airport type: Private
- Operator: Barrick (Lawlers) NL
- Location: Lawlers Gold Mine
- Elevation AMSL: 1,598 ft / 487 m
- Coordinates: 28°05′31″S 120°32′27″E

Map
- Location in Western Australia

Runways
Direction	Length		Surface
Direction	m	ft	Surface
09/27	2,000	6,562	Gravel
- Sources: Australian AIP

Lawlers Airport is an airport (ICAO: YLAW) that is located at Lawlers Gold Mine, Western Australia.

== See also ==
- List of airports in Western Australia
- Transport in Australia § Aviation
