= Manjimup Airport =

Airport in Western Australia

Manjimup Regional Airport
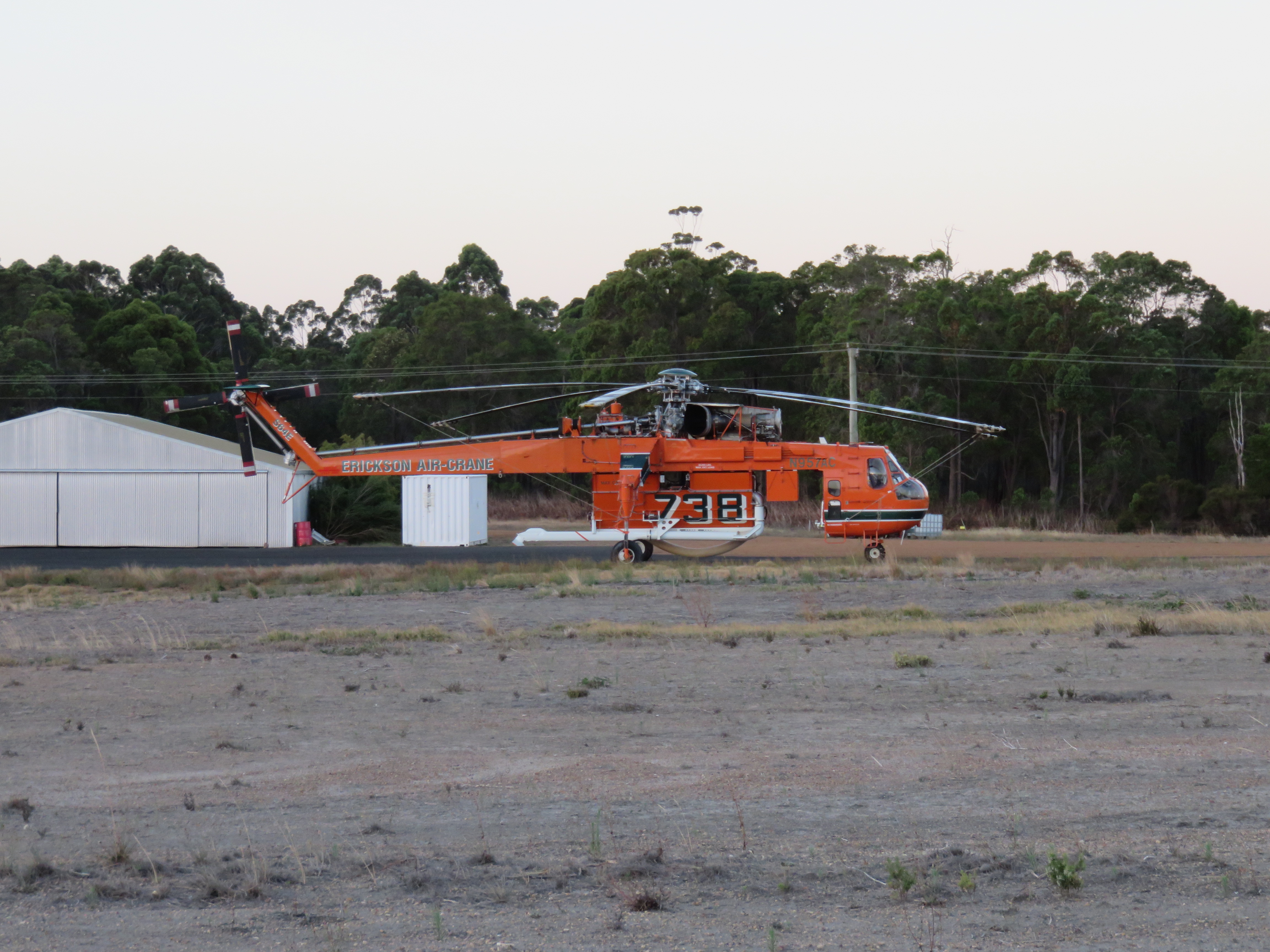
- Aircrane Erickson Inc. Sikorsky S-64 at Manjimup
- IATA: MJP; ICAO: YMJM

Summary
- Airport type: Public
- Operator: Shire of Manjimup
- Location: Manjimup, Western Australia, Australia
- Elevation AMSL: 940 ft / 287 m
- Coordinates: 34°15′55″S 116°08′25″E

Map
- Location in Western Australia

Runways
Direction	Length		Surface
Direction	m	ft	Surface
12/30	1,224	4,016	Asphalt
- Sources: Australian AIP and aerodrome chart

Manjimup Airport (IATA: MJP, ICAO: YMJM) is located at Manjimup, Western Australia.

== See also ==
- List of airports in Western Australia
- Aviation transport in Australia
