= Karara Airport =

- IATA: KQR; ICAO: YKAR

Summary
- Airport type: Private
- Operator: Karara Mining Ltd
- Location: Karara, Western Australia
- Elevation AMSL: 1,011 ft / 308 m
- Coordinates: 29°13′00″S 116°41′12″E

Map
- Location in Western Australia

Runways
Direction	Length		Surface
Direction	m	ft	Surface
12/30	1,400	4,593	Asphalt
- Sources: Australian AIP

Karara Airport (IATA: KQR, ICAO: YKAR) is located at Karara, Western Australia.

== See also ==
- List of airports in Western Australia
- Transport in Australia § Aviation
