= Mount Keith Airport =

Airport in Western Australia

- IATA: WME; ICAO: YMNE

Summary
- Airport type: Private
- Operator: BHP
- Location: Mount Keith Mine
- Elevation AMSL: 1,792 ft / 546 m
- Coordinates: 27°17′07″S 120°32′59″E

Map
- Location in Western Australia

Runways
Direction	Length		Surface
Direction	m	ft	Surface
11/29	1,797	5,896
- Sources: Australian AIP and aerodrome chart

Mount Keith Airport (IATA: WME, ICAO: YMNE) is located at Mount Keith Mine, Western Australia and is operated by BHP.

== See also ==
- List of airports in Western Australia
- Aviation transport in Australia
