= Katanning Airport =

Airport in Western Australia

- IATA: KNI; ICAO: YKNG

Summary
- Airport type: Public
- Operator: Katanning Shire Council
- Location: Katanning, Western Australia, Australia
- Elevation AMSL: 932 ft / 284 m
- Coordinates: 33°41′58″S 117°39′25″E

Map
- Location in Western Australia

Runways
Direction	Length		Surface
Direction	m	ft	Surface
07/25	1,500	4,921	Gravel
13/31	900	2,953	Dirt
- Sources: Australian AIP and aerodrome chart

Katanning Airport (IATA: KNI, ICAO: YKNG) is located at Katanning, Western Australia.

== See also ==
- List of airports in Western Australia
- Transport in Australia § Aviation
