= Mullewa Airport =

Airport in Western Australia

- IATA: MXU; ICAO: YMWA

Summary
- Operator: Mullewa Shire Council
- Location: Mullewa, Western Australia, Australia
- Elevation AMSL: 950 ft / 290 m
- Coordinates: 28°28′26″S 115°31′04″E

Map
- Location in Western Australia

Runways
| Direction | Length | | Surface |
| Direction | m | ft | Surface |
|---|---|---|---|
| 05/23 | 1,439 | 4,721 |
- Sources: AIP, Airportguide.com

Mullewa Airport (IATA: MXU, ICAO: YMWA) is located at Mullewa, Western Australia.

== See also ==
- List of airports in Western Australia
- Transport in Australia § Aviation
