= Southern Cross Airport (Western Australia) =

Airport in the wheatbelt region of Western Australia

- IATA: SQC; ICAO: YSCR

Summary
- Airport type: Private
- Operator: Shire of Yilgarn
- Location: Southern Cross, Western Australia
- Elevation AMSL: 1,163 ft / 354 m
- Coordinates: 31°14′25″S 119°21′35″E

Map
- Location in Western Australia

Runways
Direction	Length		Surface
Direction	m	ft	Surface
14/32	1,405	4,610	Gravel
09/27	1,325	4,347	Gravel
- Sources: Australian AIP and aerodrome chart

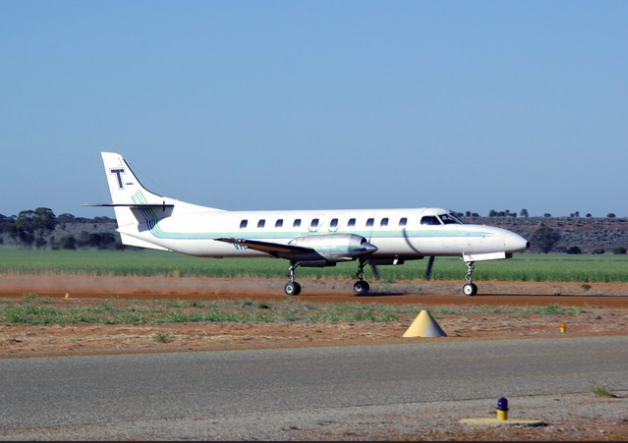
Fairchild Swearingen SA-226TC Metro II at Southern Cross after landing

Southern Cross Airport (IATA: SQC, ICAO: YSCR) is at Southern Cross in the eastern part of the Wheatbelt region of Western Australia.

== See also ==
- List of airports in Western Australia
- Aviation transport in Australia
