= Morawa Airport =

Airport in Western Australia

- IATA: MWB; ICAO: YMRW

Summary
- Airport type: Public
- Operator: Shire of Morawa
- Location: Morawa, Western Australia, Australia
- Elevation AMSL: 886 ft / 270 m
- Coordinates: 29°12′05″S 116°01′19″E

Map
- Location in Western Australia

Runways
Direction	Length		Surface
Direction	m	ft	Surface
15/33	1,350	4,429	Asphalt
09/27	1,230	4,035	Gravel
- Sources: Australian AIP and aerodrome chart

Morawa Airport (IATA: MWB, ICAO: YMRW) Morawa, Western Australia.

== See also ==
- List of airports in Western Australia
- Aviation transport in Australia
