= Windarling Airport =

Airport in Western Australia

- IATA: WRN; ICAO: YWDG

Summary
- Airport type: Private
- Operator: Cliffs Natural Resources Pty Ltd
- Location: Windarling Mine, Western Australia, Australia
- Elevation AMSL: 1,502 ft / 458 m
- Coordinates: 30°01′54″S 119°23′24″E

Map
- Location of the airport in Western Australia

Runways
Direction	Length		Surface
Direction	m	ft	Surface
10L/28R	1,850	6,070	Asphalt
- Sources: Australian AIP, STV

Windarling Airport (IATA: WRN, ICAO: YWDG) is located at Windarling Mine, Western Australia.

== See also ==
- List of airports in Western Australia
- Transport in Australia § Aviation
