= Tom Price Airport =

- IATA: TPR; ICAO: YTOM

Summary
- Airport type: Public
- Owner: Pilbara Iron
- Location: Tom Price, Western Australia
- Elevation AMSL: 2,300 ft / 701 m
- Coordinates: 22°44′46″S 117°52′08″E

Map
- Location in Western Australia

Runways
Direction	Length		Surface
Direction	m	ft	Surface
09/27	760	2,493	Dirt
- Sources: DAFIF

Tom Price Airport (IATA: TPR, ICAO: YTOM) is an airport near Tom Price, in the Pilbara region of Western Australia. It has a short dirt runway capable of handing small general aviation aircraft and light turboprops.

In December 2008, Rio Tinto lodged an application with the Shire of Ashburton to upgrade the runway and facilities to handle Airbus A320 and Boeing 737 size aircraft. This was planned to ease traffic at Paraburdoo Airport and allow tourists to access the nearby Karijini National Park.

However, on 16 January 2009, suffering the effects of lower demand and ore prices as a result of the Great Recession, these plans were scrapped as Rio's capital expenditure program was cut.

The strategic location of the planned airport has been chosen also to handle the expansions at the Brockman minesite, by Pilbara Iron.

== See also ==
- List of airports in Western Australia
- Aviation transport in Australia
