= List of airports in Perth =

This is a list of airports in Perth, Western Australia.

== List of airports ==
The list is sorted by the name of the community served, click the sort buttons in the table header to switch listing order.

Community	Airport name	Type	ICAO	IATA	Coordinates
Bullsbrook	RAAF Base Pearce	Military	YPEA		31°40′04″S 116°00′54″E
Jandakot	Jandakot Airport	Public	YPJT	JAD	32°05′51″S 115°52′52″E
Perth Airport	Perth Airport	Public	YPPH	PER	31°56′25″S 115°58′01″E

== Defunct airports ==
Community	Airport name	Type	ICAO	IATA	Coordinates
Caversham	Caversham Airfield	Military			31°50′16″S 115°58′27″E
Langley Park, Perth	Langley Park Airstrip	Public	YPLP		31°57′41″S 115°52′07″E

== See also ==
- List of airports in Western Australia
