= Murrin Murrin Airport =

Airport in Western Australia

- IATA: WUI; ICAO: YMMI

Summary
- Airport type: Private
- Operator: Minara Resources Pty Ltd.
- Location: Murrin Murrin Joint Venture
- Elevation AMSL: 1,535 ft / 468 m
- Coordinates: 28°42′19″S 121°53′26″E

Map
- Location in Western Australia

Runways
Direction	Length		Surface
Direction	m	ft	Surface
03/21	2,000	6,562	Asphalt
- Sources: Australian AIP and aerodrome chart

Murrin Murrin Airport (IATA: WUI, ICAO: YMMI) is located near the Murrin Murrin Joint Venture, Western Australia.

== See also ==
- List of airports in Western Australia
