= Narrow-gauge railways in Australia =

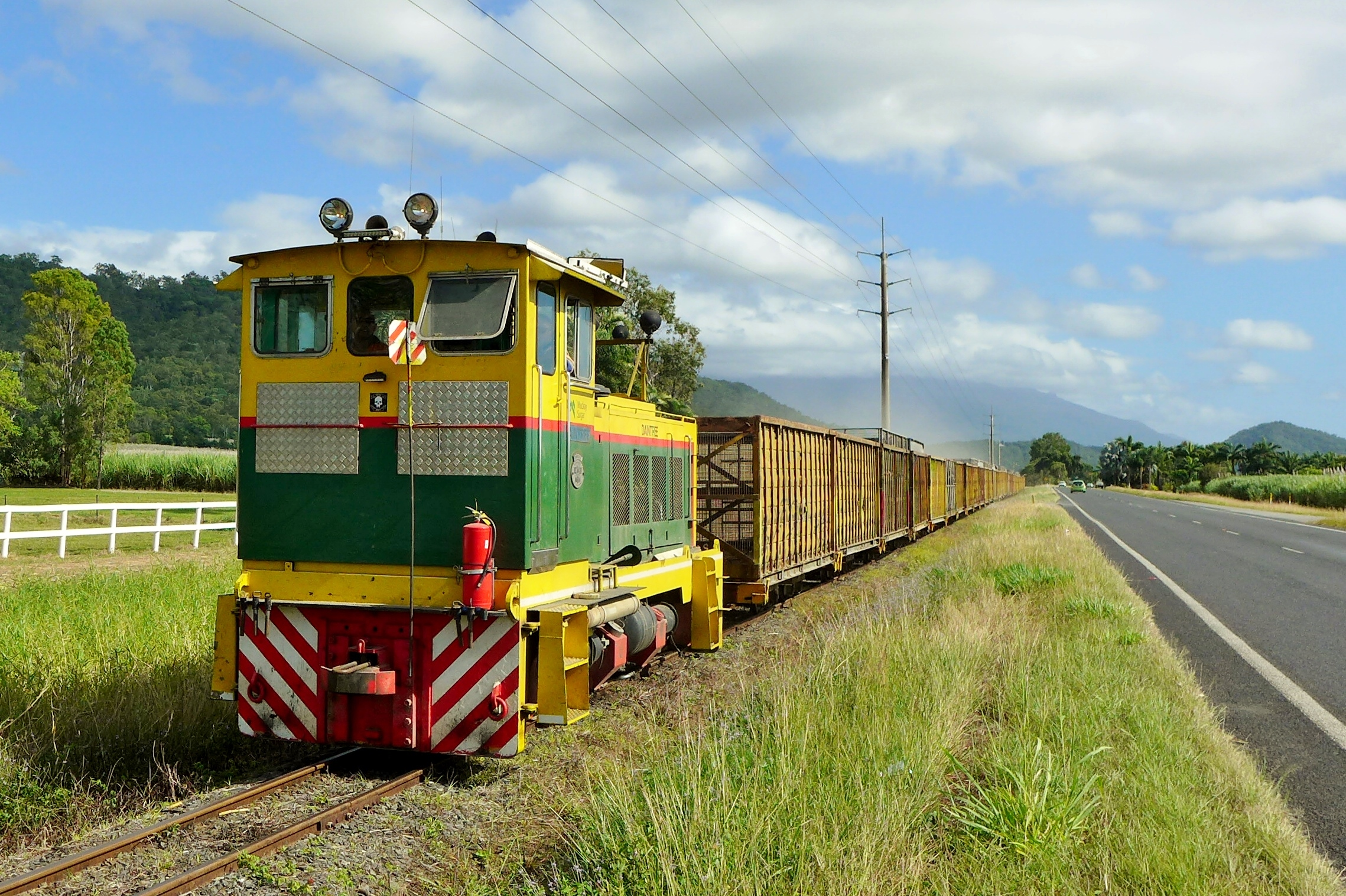
A narrow-gauge sugar cane train in Queensland during 2015

Rail transport in Australia involves several narrow-gauge railways. In some states, they formed the core statewide network, but in the others, they were either a few government branch lines, or privately owned and operated branch lines, often for mining, logging or industrial use.

Prior to becoming an independent unified country in 1901, each of the six British colonies in Australia was responsible for rail transport infrastructure. Of the six colonies, only three (Queensland, Western Australia, and Tasmania) opted for 3 ft 6 in (1,067 mm) narrow gauge railways. The other colonies (later states) opted for either 4 ft 8 1/2 in (1,435 mm) standard-gauge or 5 ft 3 in (1,600 mm) broad-gauge railways, maintaining only limited narrow-gauge rail lines, except for South Australia, which wavered between narrow and broad.

As a result of this legacy, Australian railways are a confusing mix of all three gauges. Over time most of the mainland lines of whatever gauge linked up with inconvenient break-of-gauge stations where they met, including the infamous Albury railway station on the Albury–Wodonga line from Melbourne to Sydney. Some lines remained isolated because long stretches of desert cut them off.

== By state ==
=== Queensland ===
The massive narrow-gauge 3 ft 6 in (1,067 mm) coal trains of the Queensland Railway with 100 wagons and 2 midtrain electric locomotives show what is possible with narrow gauge with modern equipment and tracklaying techniques.

In 1865, the brief given to Queensland Railways was to build a semi-mountainous line in very sparsely populated territory, and it chose light rails, sharp curves, a small loading-gauge, light engines and rolling stock, 32 km/h speeds to make a limited budget go a long way. A clever salesman convinced the Queensland government that a narrow gauge would save money, and do the job for a hundred years. Queensland Railways was the first mainline narrow-gauge railway in the world. Its tracks would eventually extend to around 9000 km.

In the intervening century, the rails have been replaced with heavier rails, there are now concrete sleepers and colour light signals, sharp curves have been straightened, tunnels have been opened out. The one thing that hasn't changed is the narrow gauge, even though the rest of the country is converting its main lines to the standard gauge 1,435 mm (4 ft 8 1/2 in).

Queensland Rail also operates the iconic QR Tilt Train, with a recommended maximum speed of 165 km/h. This train currently holds the Australian Railway Speed Record of 210.7 km/h.

Dual gauge has been added to give access from the interstate standard-gauge line to the Port of Brisbane. Dual gauge is also proposed to convert the standard-gauge interstate line for use by narrow-gauge commuter trains. Part of the so-called Inland Railway is dual gauge.

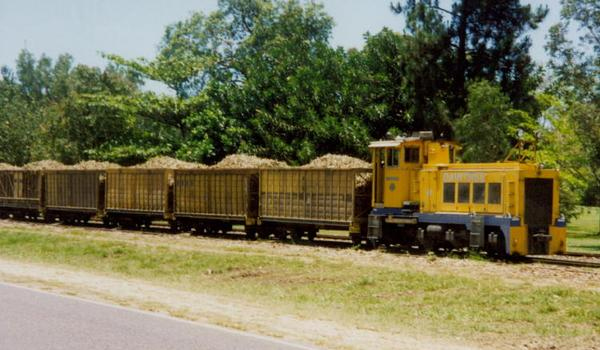
Sugar train near Mossman in 1995

Queensland also has extensive sugar cane tramways of 2 ft (610 mm) gauge. These cane tramways sometimes use second-hand standard-gauge shunting locomotives suitably regauged. The cane trams regularly haul over 500 tonnes of raw cane at a time, and because there are no continuous brakes, they may have a radio-controlled brake van coupled to the rear.

To avoid speed restriction where some cane trams cross the main line, several of these crossings have been converted to drawbridges.

=== Tasmania ===
The first railway in the island state of Tasmania was broad gauge 5 ft 3 in (1,600 mm), but following the success of the narrow gauge in Queensland, a third rail was fitted, to allow conversion to narrow gauge. The state's rail network is now entirely narrow gauge.

=== South Australia ===
The first railways in this state were 5 ft 3 in (1,600 mm) broad gauge including some lightweight horse-drawn lines. But following the success of the narrow gauge in Queensland, several narrow-gauge lines were started. Because of the geography of the state with deep gulfs of the ocean, the various narrow-gauge lines were isolated from each other to begin with. In the 1920s several narrow gauge lines were converted to broad gauge. The South Eastern narrow gauge lines were converted to broad gauge in the 1950s, with steel sleepers able to be converted to standard gauge at a later date if required.

The privately owned iron ore mines at Iron Knob and Iron Baron are connected to the steel works at Whyalla by an isolated narrow-gauge 3 ft 6 in (1,067 mm) line.

=== Western Australia ===
Inspired by the success of the narrow gauge in Queensland, Western Australia adopted the same gauge. In the capital of Perth, there was the only narrow-gauge tramway network (of any considerable extent) on mainland Australia. The final portion was closed in 1958.

=== Northern Territory ===
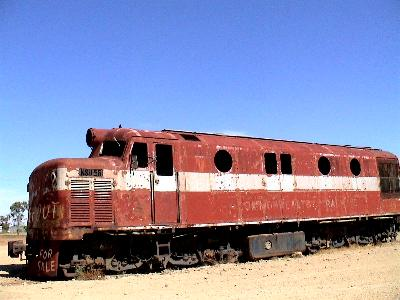
NSU class diesel locomotive as used on the Central Australia Railway

The Northern Territory adopted narrow gauge when it was still part of South Australia, and a north–south transcontinental line was planned from Adelaide to Darwin in the 1870s. The Central Australia Railway was built northwards from 1878, reaching Alice Springs in 1929, and closed in 1980 when a parallel standard-gauge railway was built.

The North Australia Railway was constructed southwards from Darwin to Birdum, opening in 1889 and closing in 1976. The 3000 km standard-gauge Adelaide–Darwin railway opened in 2004.

Because there are no tunnels or narrow bridges on the old narrow-gauge line, the line received a lot of second-hand standard-gauge rolling stock, this rolling stock being noticeably larger than the original narrow-gauge wagons and carriages.

=== New South Wales ===
The railways of New South Wales used standard gauge from the beginning. An exception was at Broken Hill where the large silver-lead mine is only 30 km from the South Australian border, but separated by hundreds of kilometres of desert from the main NSW standard-gauge railway system. As a result, in 1888 the 3 ft 6 in (1,067 mm) Silverton Tramway was opened between the mines and the South Australian Railways system, the line lasting until gauge standardisation bypassed the line in 1970.

=== Victoria ===
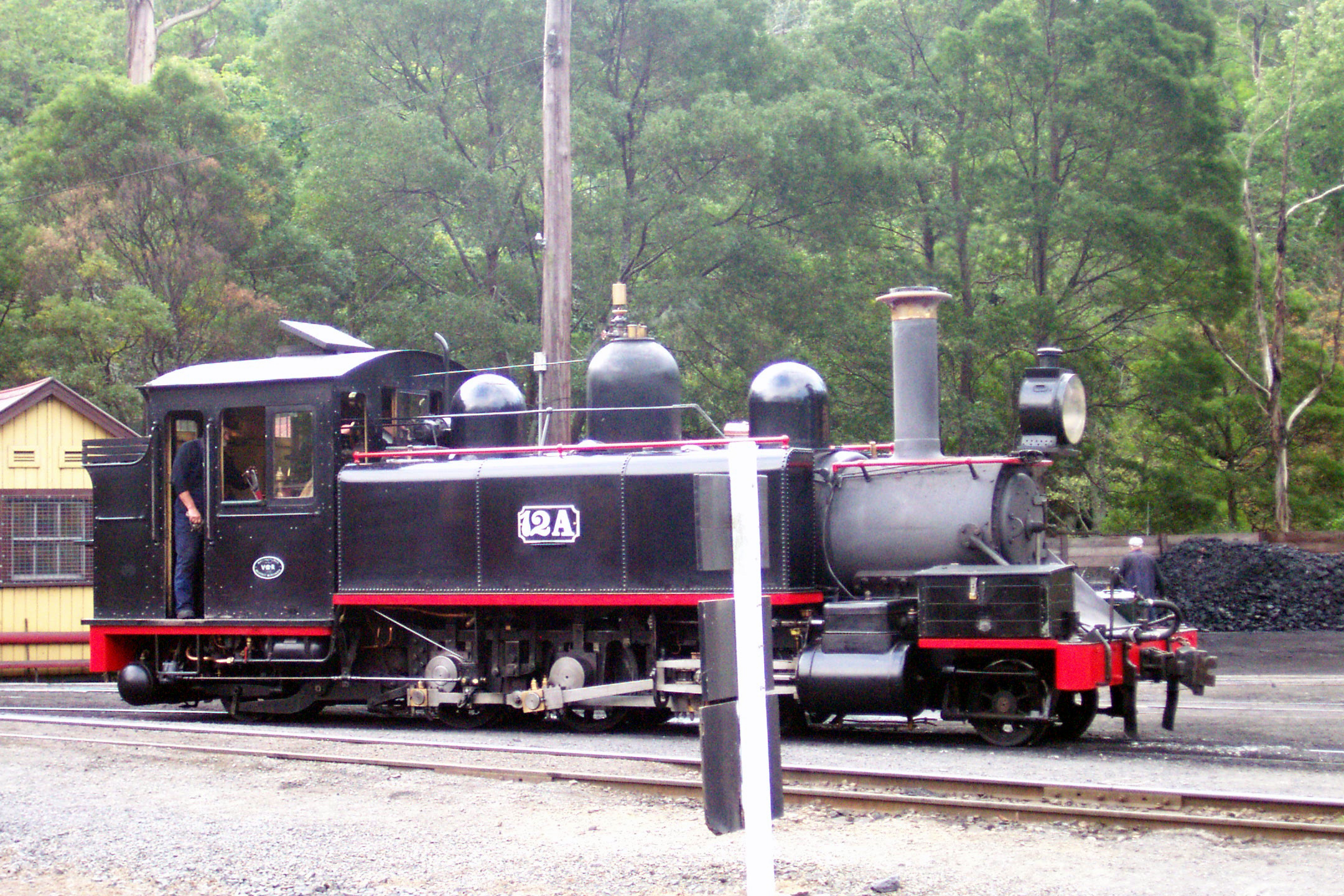
The Puffing Billy railway

Most railway lines in Victoria were built to the 5 ft 3 in (1,600 mm) broad gauge. However four common carrier lines were built to the 2 ft 6 in (762 mm) narrow gauge standard, to serve local farming and forestry communities. There was also widespread usage of narrow-gauge forestry railways and tramways. Sections of two lines (Belgrave to Gembrook and Thomson to Walhalla) have been restored as tourist railways.

The Puffing Billy Railway is maintained and operated by volunteers as a steam-hauled preserved railway and tourist attraction. The last of the four narrow-gauge railways to open, the Moe to Walhalla line in Gippsland, which was opened in 1910 and then closed in 1954, has been partially reopened from Thomson Station into Walhalla in recent years as the Walhalla Goldfields Railway. Because the Puffing Billy Railway has nearly all of the remaining locomotives and rolling stock known to exist from the four NG lines, this line has had to modify rolling stock from elsewhere or build new, but non-original style, rolling stock.

In addition to the main rail network of the Victorian Railways and successors, a number of narrow-gauge private railways and tramways have also existed for logging and mining purposes. These included the Yallourn 900mm Railway in the Latrobe Valley open cut coal mines, the Fyansford Cement Works Railway near Geelong, the Tyers Valley Tramway at Mount Baw Baw, and the Powelltown Tramway from Yarra Junction.

Most logging tramways operated in the Otway Ranges, Gippsland, and the inner east of the Great Dividing Range; primarily between the 1850s and the 1950s, with only one surviving into the 1960s. They were primarily of 3 ft 6 in (1,067 mm) or 3 ft (914 mm) gauge, with 2 ft (610 mm), 2 ft 6 in (762 mm), 4 ft (1,219 mm), 5 ft 3 in (1,600 mm) and variants also used.
