= Lake Gregory (Western Australia) =

Lake in Western Australia

Lake Gregory (Paraku)
- Paraku (Walmajarri)
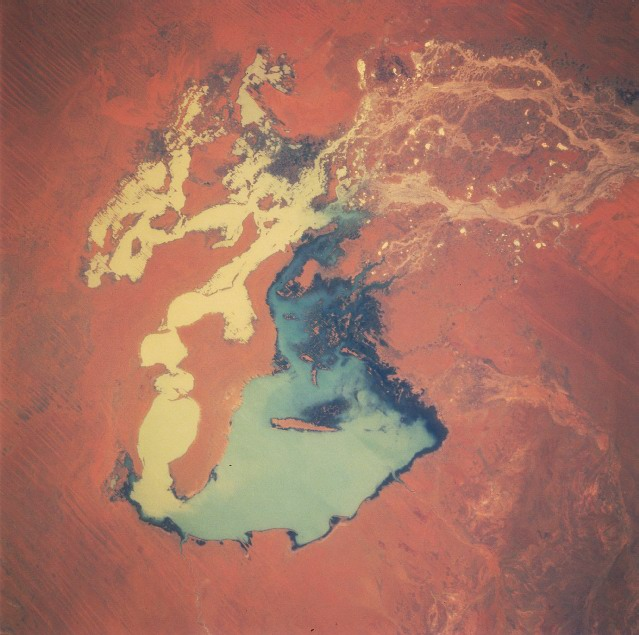
- Lake Gregory from space, September 1993. The main body of the lake appears bluish-turquoise in the center of the picture. The multi-braided channels (upper right) that feed water into Lake Gregory from the northeast are part of the Sturt Creek drainage system. There appears to be an excess of standing water in the channels (muddy-looking, yellowish) north and west of the main part of the lake. The surrounding landscape consists of grasslands with numerous sand ridges (thin, dark, parallel lines on the lower left side of the image).

- Location in Western Australia
- Interactive map of Lake Gregory (Paraku)
- Location: Kimberley, Western Australia
- Coordinates: 20°12′S 127°27′E
- Type: Brackish water
- Primary inflows: Sturt Creek
- Primary outflows: internal drainage
- Basin countries: Australia

Lake Gregory, or Paraku in the Walmajarri language, is a permanent brackish lake in the Kimberley region of Western Australia, situated between the Great Sandy Desert and the Tanami Desert. Following monsoonal rains it may hold fresh water, but becomes more saline after a number of dry years.

== Location ==
The lake is situated approximately 220 kilometres (140 mi) south of Halls Creek near where the Tanami Desert meets the Great Sandy Desert. The nearest town is the Mulan Community located 8 kilometres (5 mi) to the east of the lake shore. The boundaries of two pastoral leases also encompass parts of the lake; Billiluna Station to the north and Lake Gregory Station to the south.

Lake Gregory is situated on the edge of Mulan Aboriginal Community, home to the Walmajarri people. It is a traditional site to the people, containing several culturally significant sites. The Paraku Indigenous Protected Area works with traditional owners and rangers to monitor and maintain the lake and its surroundings.

== Description ==
The lake is about 200 metres (660 ft) above sea level. The system includes an area of about 400 square kilometres (150 sq mi) that is subject to regular flooding within a much larger, approximately 5,000-square-kilometre (2,000 sq mi), paleolake bed.

The depth of the lake can vary from 1 to 10 metres (3 to 33 ft).

It lies at the far southwest extremity of the Tanami subregion of the Tanami Interim Biogeographic Regionalisation of Australia region. The Tanami subregion is composed mainly red Quaternary sandplains overlying Permian and Proterozoic strata that are exposed as hills and ranges around the area. Alluvial and lacustrine calcareous deposits occur throughout the subregion. In the north they are associated with Sturt Creek drainage and further south as part of the lake bed.

The lake lies in the northeast Canning Basin, within the Gregory sub-basin and is underlain by almost 16 kilometres (10 mi) of sedimentary rocks, ranging in age from Ordovician to mid-Triassic. The rocks are covered by alluvium and lacustrine sediments to a maximum thickness of approximately 30 metres (98 ft). The bed of the lake is clay with the formation of some salt and gypsum pans.

The Lake Gregory System consists of several interconnected waterbodies and is fed primarily by Sturt Creek. The creek has a catchment area of approximately 65,000 square kilometres (25,000 sq mi) and flows north to south as a single channel until a short distance south of Halls Creek. After this, it breaks into an anastomosing channel system forming a series of shallow interconnected basins. The western tributary of Sturt Creek feeds into Rillya, Kurdu, Yuenbi and Bulbi Lakes. The eastern tributary discharges through Leira waterhole into Mulan Lake which is the largest lake and can remain full for several years following stream flow events.

== History ==
The lake was once part of a inland sea some ten times larger than the current lake around 300,000 years ago. It is now part of a larger system of freshwater and salt water lakes fed by Sturt Creek. The waters of the lake are dependent on water coming in from the creek and from monsoonal rains. Water loss from the lake is due to evaporation and infiltration into the paleochannel. There is no outflow from the lake.

The lake appeared as Gregory's Salt Sea on Alfred Canning's map of the area when he was surveying the Canning Stock Route. It was named to honour the explorer Augustus Gregory who traversed the area in 1856.

The country around the lake and river systems provides an abundant source of plant and animal life that attracted the attention of the pastoral industry in the early 1900s. The Canning Stock Route, established in 1910 from Halls Creek south to the rail-head at Wiluna to drove cattle from the east Kimberley, runs down the western margin of the lake system.

Lake Gregory Station covers 270,000 hectares (667,185 acres) and has a potential carrying capacity of 6,720 cattle. It had not operated as a cattle station from the 1980s to 2016 when it was acquired by the Aboriginal Land Trust. It has been sub-leased to the Yougawalla Pastoral Company.

In 2001 the High Court of Australia formally recognised the Walmajarri peoples as the traditional owners of the area and awarded them native title over the land. A handover ceremony was conducted on the shores of the lake.

Stone artefacts in situ in sediments recovered from an archaeological dig in 2008 at the Parnkupirti site at Lake Gregory, give optically stimulated luminescence age determinations of at least 37,000 years, making Lake Gregory among the oldest-known inhabited sites in Australia.

== Flora ==
The sandplains around the lake support mixed shrub steppes of Hakea species, desert bloodwoods, a variety of Acacia and Grevillea species over soft spinifex hummock grasslands. Wattle scrub over soft spinifex hummock grass communities occur on the ranges of the area. The drainage lines of the creeks support ribbon and Flinders grasses and other short grasslands, often as savannas with stands of River red gums.

== Birds ==
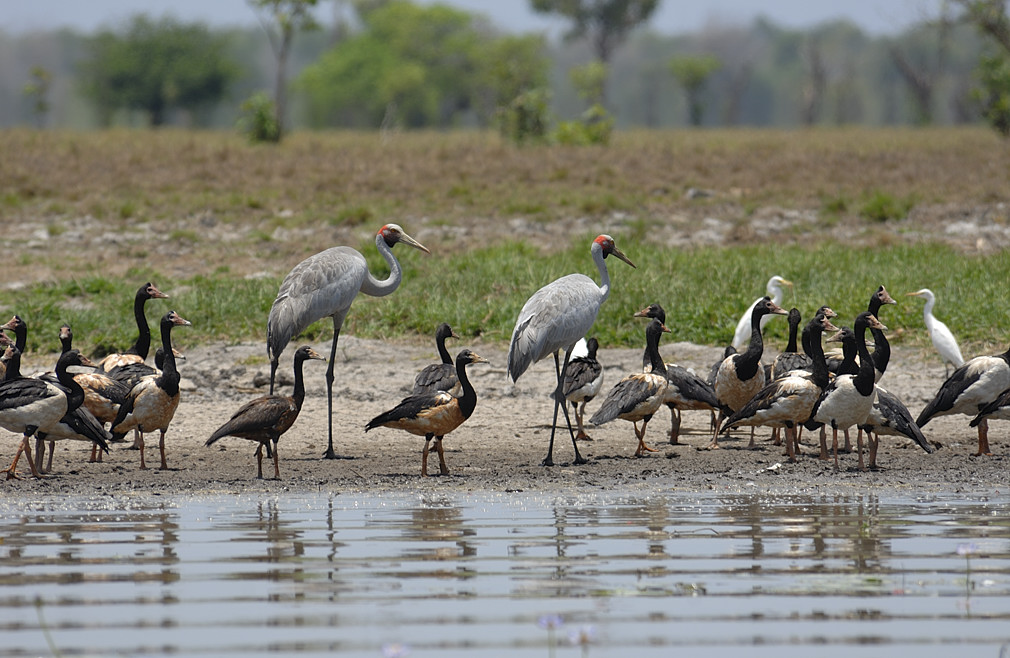
A pair of brolgas amongst other waterbirds in the Northern Territory

The lake serves as a major migratory stop-over area for a variety of shorebirds. It also provides a major breeding habitat of several species of water birds, including cormorants and terns. It has been identified by BirdLife International as an Important Bird Area (IBA) because it supports over 1% of the world populations of hardheads, grey teals, pink-eared ducks, little black cormorants, brolgas, sharp-tailed sandpipers. It sometimes supports similarly important numbers of magpie geese, Pacific black ducks, freckled ducks and Oriental plovers, as well as providing habitat for Australian bustards.

The lake regularly supports over 100,000 water birds, more than any other inland fresh water lake in Australia. In 1988 more than half a million water birds were recorded at the lake representing at least 67 different species.

== See also ==
- List of lakes of Australia § Western Australia
