= West Subiaco Aerodrome =

- IATA: none; ICAO: none

Summary
- Owner: Hermann Christian Ittershagen
- Location: Mount Claremont, Perth in Western Australia
- Opened: 1929; 97 years ago
- Closed: 1933
- Coordinates: 31°57′14″S 115°47′15″E

Map
- Location in Western Australia

West Subiaco Aerodrome was an airfield located in Mount Claremont, Perth in Western Australia. It was established in 1929 by businessman H.C. Ittershagen, and a dedicated aero club was founded a year later. The airfield was the first private licensed aerodrome in Western Australia, hosting aerial pageants, glider activities, and flying instruction. At the height of the Great Depression during 1933, the aerodrome ceased activity and was abandoned.

== History ==
In 1929, Australian-German businessman Hermann Christian Ittershagen leased 66 acres of endowment land in Mount Claremont. Afterwards the land was cleared and levelled, taking around two years due to the heavy tuart vegetation. Afterwards, he imported two Klemm light aircraft to support his tractor business, allowing mechanics to fly directly to distant farms wirh spare parts and equipment. A hangar was erected, and the first aircraft arrived in July and the second in November. The first aircraft, a Klemm L.25-1 (registered VH-ULU) was assembled at the new airfield and test-flown on 18 August 1929 by Harry "Cannonball" Baker. It was the first licensed private aerodrome in Western Australia.

In 1930, the Subiaco Aero Club was established, based at the aerodrome. It provided flying instruction, with a ten-hour course costing £25. It also held regular meetings and aerial pageants. The club also involved glider construction, and gliders would be launched by a car and catapult system. In January 1930, Ittershagen's float-equipped Klemm flew to Rottnest Island, becoming the first. In August 1931, the club organised an aerial pageant at the aerodrome.

=== Closure and abandonment ===
In May 1933, during the Great Depression, Ittershagen had abandoned his aviation operations. Afterwards, the aerodrome fell into inactivity and disuse. In 1936, Western Australia's first Mighet HM.14 Flying FEA was tested at the aerodrome by Bob Raper. In the 1960s, the former aerodrome was redeveloped to become the McGillvray sports oval.

== See also ==
- Maylands Airport
