= Nifty copper mine =

Mine in Western Australia

Nifty Copper Mine
- Location in Western Australia
- Interactive map of Nifty Copper Mine
- Location: Telfer, Western Australia, Australia; 21°39′20″S 121°34′20″E
- Products: Copper
- Production: 700,000 tonnes
- Financial year: Historical production 1993–2019
- Discovered: 1981
- Opened: 1993
- Closed: 2019
- Company: Cyprium Metals
- Website: www.cypriummetals.com
- Acquired: 2021

Nifty Copper Mine is an open pit and underground mining operation in the Great Sandy Desert in the Pilbara region of Western Australia.

The mine is located on the traditional land of the Martu people.

== Overview ==
The open pit extracts copper oxide ore. The underground mine reaches a deeper copper sulphide ore. The Nifty copper resource was discovered in 1981 by Western Mining Corporation and mining commenced in 1993. Nifty was purchased by Straits Resources in 1998, Aditya Birla Minerals in March 2003 then by Metals X in August 2016.

Underground mine development commenced in January 2004 via a decline from the bottom of the open pit. Ore was first intersected in February 2005 and first concentrate production in March 2006. Mining operations were suspended in November 2019 due to poor prices for copper.

The mine is serviced by Nifty Airport which has fly-in fly-out workers from Perth on charter flights. It is also serviced by road, 350 kilometres from Port Hedland, the last 45 km is unsealed, beyond the Woodie Woodie Mine.

In early 2021, Metals X sold the mine and two other copper projects for a combined A$60 million, A$24 million of it in cash, to Cyprium Metals . From commencement of production in 1993 to the placing of the mine into care and maintenance in 2019, Nifty had produced in excess of 700,000 tonnes of copper metal.

The mine is located on the traditional land of the Martu people, something confirmed by the Federal Court of Australia in two rulings in 2002 and 2013.
