= Mulan Community, Western Australia =

Community in Western Australia

Mulan
- Town
- Interactive map of Mulan
- Coordinates: 20°6′10.1″S 127°35′42.5″E
- Country: Australia
- State: Western Australia
- LGA: Shire of Halls Creek

Government
  - State electorate: Kimberley
  - Federal division: Durack

Population
  - Total: 111 (ILOC 2021)

Mulan is a small Aboriginal community in Western Australia's east Kimberley. The community is in the Shire of Halls Creek, 44 km to the southwest of Balgo and about 10 km east of Lake Gregory. At the 2006 census, Mulan had a population of 114.

Most Mulan people are speakers of the Kukatja language, which is also spoken at Balgo. Kukatja is closely related to Pintupi, spoken at Kintore and Kiwirrkura and many Mulan residents are closely related to people at those communities as well as at Balgo.

== History ==
Mulan was established as a permanent Aboriginal community in the late 1970s by Walmajarri people moving away from the Balgo mission to the Lake Gregory Pastoral Station, near the shores of Lake Gregory. A major factor behind this was the transfer of the pastoral station from Lake Gregory Pty Ltd to the Aboriginal Land Trust in 1978.

The community became incorporated in 1979 and the first houses and school were constructed in the same year. In 1985, Crown Reserve 39102 was excised from the pastoral lease and vested to the ALT for the "use and benefit of Aboriginal inhabitants", with the land being formally leased to Mulan Aboriginal Corporation the following year.

== Native title ==
The community is covered by the determined Tjurabalan People native title claim (WCD2001/001).

== Governance ==
The community is managed through its incorporated body, Mallingbar Aboriginal Corporation, incorporated under the Aboriginal Councils and Associations Act 1796 on 26 April 1983.

== Town planning ==
Mulan Layout Plan No.2 is not yet endorsed by the community and exists in draft format only. The Layout Plan map-set and background report can be viewed at Planning Western Australia's website.

== See also ==
- Indigenous Australian art
- Papunya Tula
- Western Desert language
