= Transport in Australia =

A map of major roads in Australia. Roads are the main method of transport in Australia.

There are many forms of transport in Australia. Australia is highly dependent on road transport due to its large size. There are more than 300 airports with paved runways. Passenger rail transport includes widespread commuter networks in the major capital cities with more limited intercity and interstate networks. The Australian mining sector is reliant upon rail to transport its product to Australia's ports for export.

Australian passenger transport is dominated by road transport.

Passenger kilometres by mode Australia.

== Road transport ==
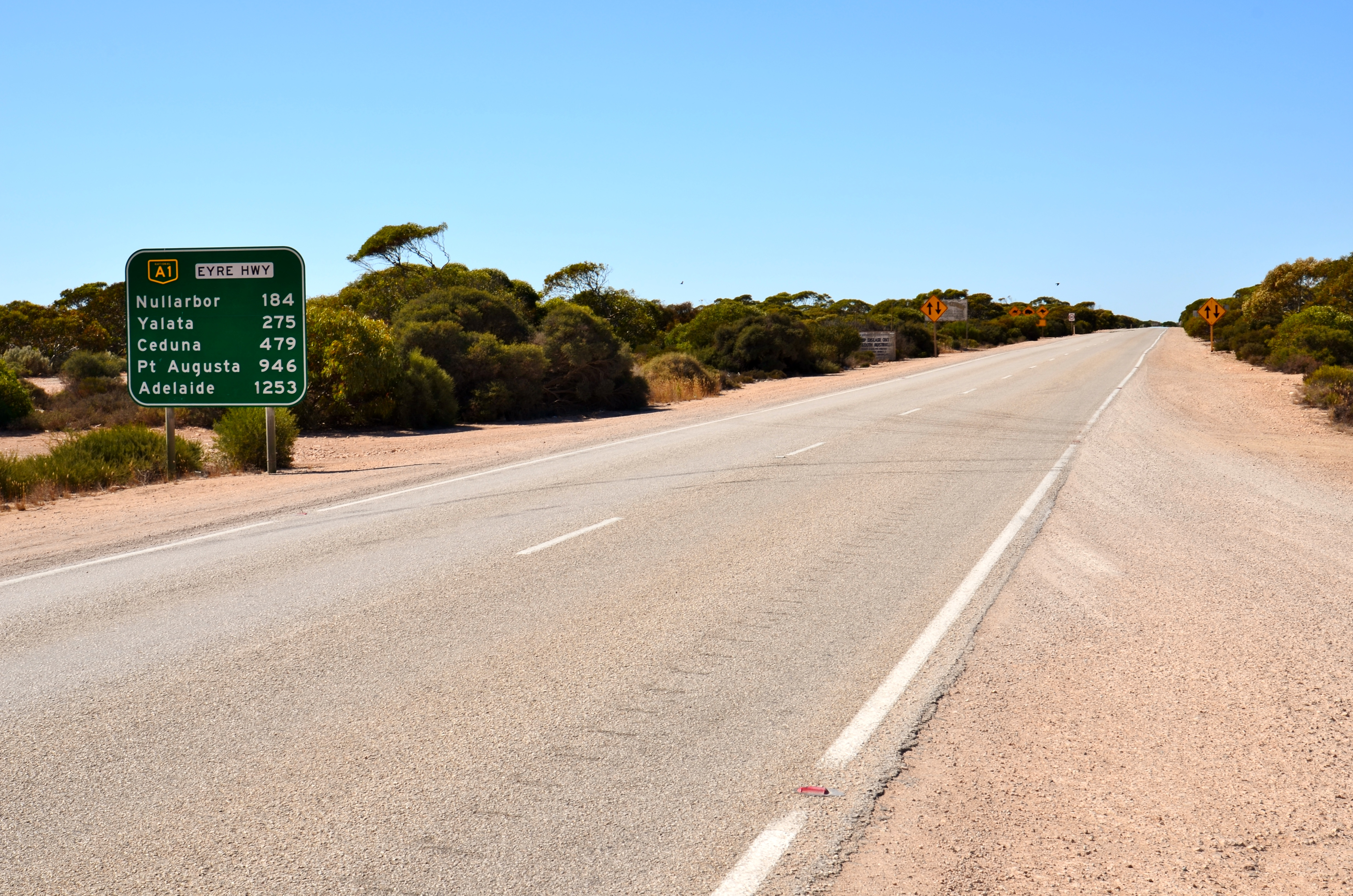
Highway sign on the Eyre Highway, Border Village.

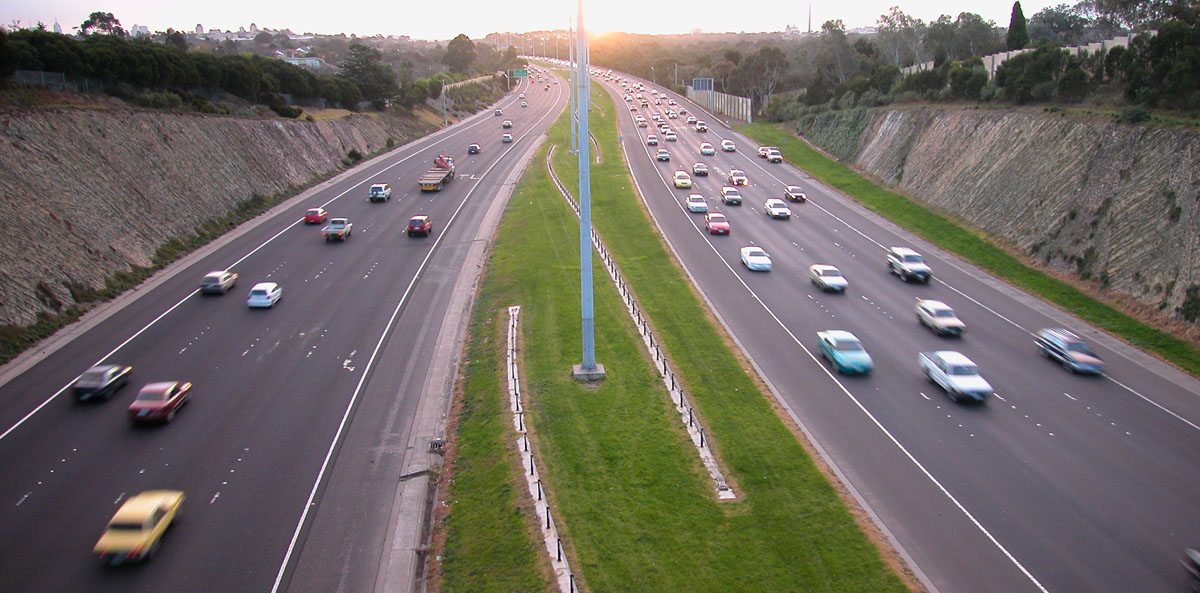
Eastern Freeway, Melbourne

Road transport is an essential element of the Australian transport network, and an enabler of the Australian economy. There is a heavy reliance on road transport due to Australia's large area and low population density in considerable parts of the country. This is similar to the US. Australia's road network experiences excessive demand during peak periods and very weak demand overnight.

Another reason for the reliance upon roads is that the Australian rail network has not been sufficiently developed for a lot of the freight and passenger requirements in most areas of Australia. This has meant that goods that would otherwise be transported by rail are moved across Australia via road trains. Almost every household owns at least one car, and uses it most days.

There are three different categories of Australian roads. They are federal highways, state highways and local roads. In 2024, Australia had an estimated 476,000 km of paved roads.

Victoria has the largest network, with thousands of arterial (major, primary and secondary) roads to add.

The majority of road tunnels in Australia have been constructed since the 1990s to relieve traffic congestion in metropolitan areas, or to cross significant watercourses.

=== Cars ===
Australia has the thirteenth-highest level of car ownership in the world. It has three to four times more road per capita than Europe and seven to nine times more than Asia. Australia also has the third-highest per capita rate of fuel consumption in the world. Melbourne is the most car-dependent city in Australia, according to a data survey in the 2010s, having over 110,000 more cars driving to and from the city each day than Sydney. Perth, Adelaide and Brisbane are rated as being close behind. All these capital cities are rated among the highest in this category in the world (car dependency). The distance travelled by car (or similar vehicle) in Australia is among the highest in the world.

=== Electric vehicles ===
The adoption of plug-in electric vehicles in Australia is driven mostly by state-based electric vehicle targets and monetary incentives to support the adoption and deployment of low- or zero-emission vehicles. The monetary incentives include electric vehicle subsidies, interest-free loans, registration exemptions, stamp duty exemptions, the luxury car tax exemption and discounted parking for both private and commercial purchases. The Victorian and New South Wales governments target between 50% and 53% of new car sales to be electric vehicles by 2030.

== Public transport in Australia ==
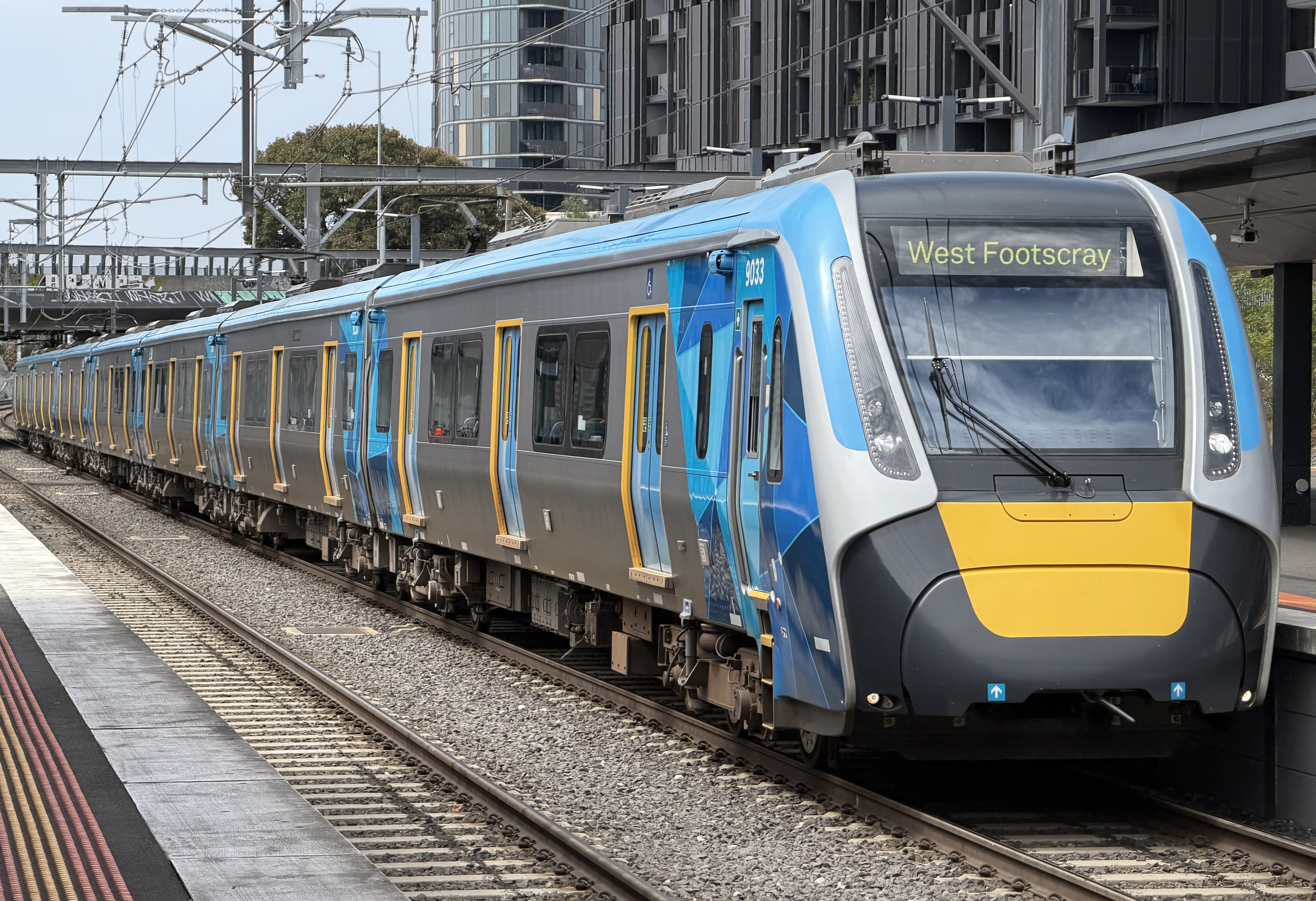
HCMT Commuter train in Melbourne

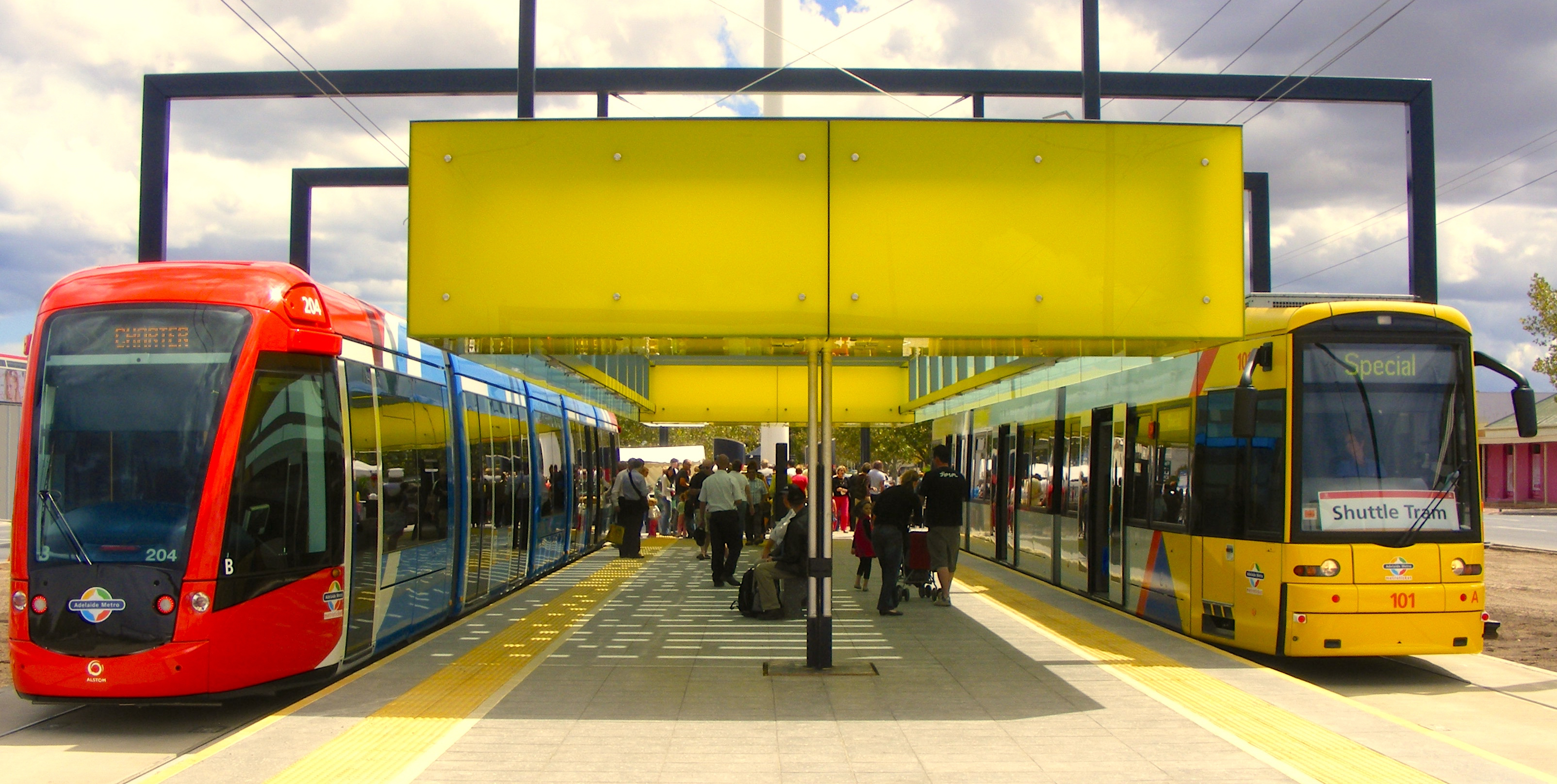
Alstom Citadis and Bombardier Flexity Classic trams in Adelaide

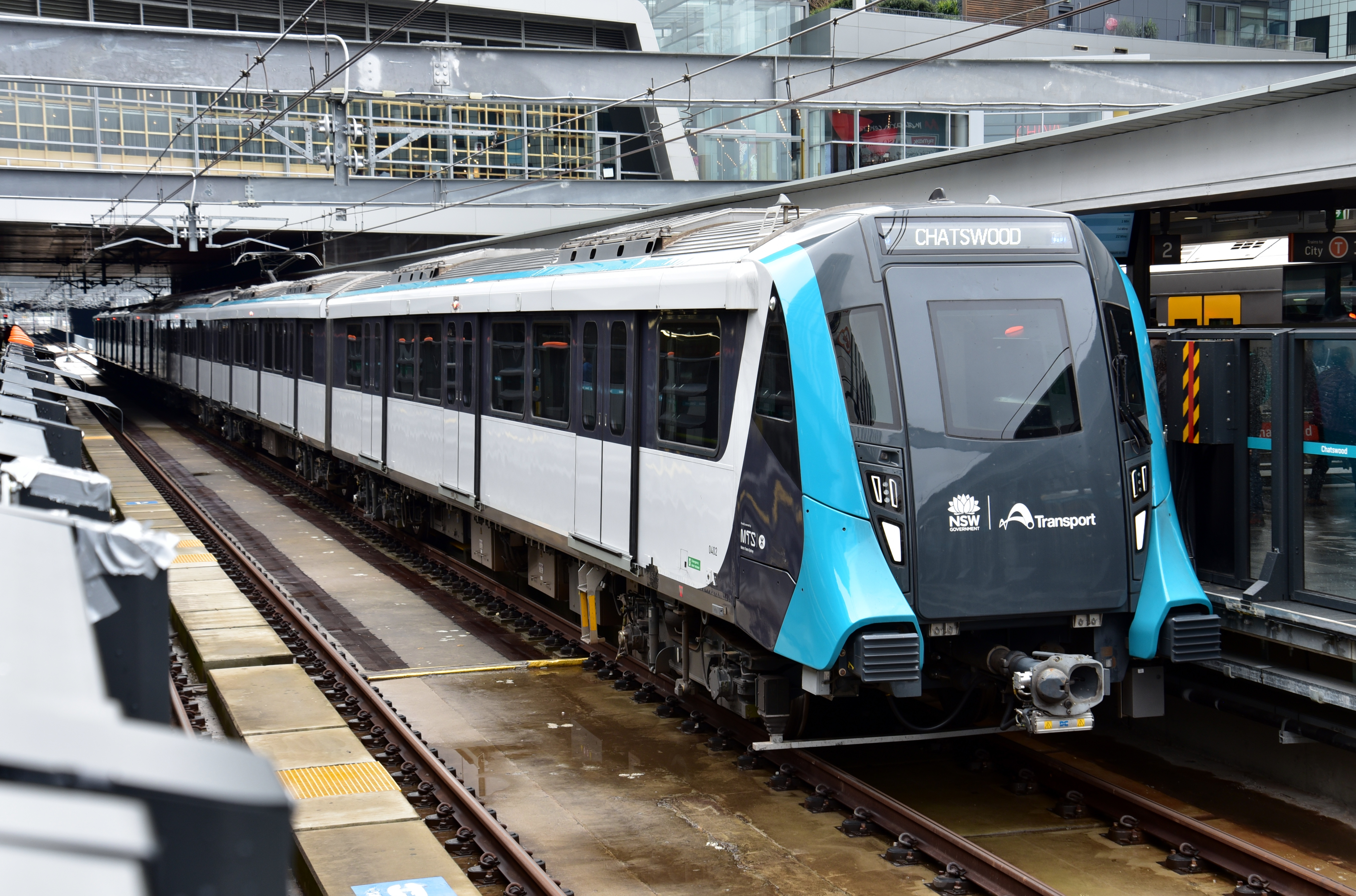
A driverless Alstom Metropolis train on the Sydney Metro network

=== Suburban rail ===
Sydney, Melbourne, Brisbane, Perth and Adelaide have extensive suburban rail networks which have grown and expanded over time. Australian suburban rail typically operates with bidirectional all-day services with Sydney, Melbourne, and to a lesser extent Perth and Brisbane's systems operating with much higher frequencies, particularly in their underground cores. Sydney Trains operates the busiest system in the country with approximately 1 million trips per day. Metro Trains Melbourne operates a larger system albeit with a lower number of trips.

=== Trams and light rail ===
Trams have historically operated in many Australian towns and cities, with the majority of these being shut down before the 1970s in the belief that more widespread car ownership would render them unnecessary. Melbourne is a major exception and today has the largest tram network of any city in the world. Adelaide retained one tram service — the Glenelg tram line, since 2008 extended to Hindmarsh and the East End. Trams once operated in Sydney, Brisbane, Perth, and Hobart, and a number of major regional cities including Ballarat, Bendigo, Broken Hill, Fremantle, Geelong, Kalgoorlie, Launceston, Maitland, Newcastle, Rockhampton, and Sorrento.

The Inner West Light Rail opened in Sydney in 1997 with the conversion of a disused section of the Metropolitan Goods line. The CBD and South East Light Rail opened to Randwick in December 2019 and Kingsford in April 2020. A light rail system opened on the Gold Coast in 2014. A line opened in Newcastle in February 2019 and one in Canberra opened in April 2019.

=== Rapid transit ===
Both Sydney and Melbourne have rapid transit systems. The Sydney Metro currently consists of one 66 km driverless line with 31 stations, connecting the city from Tallawong to Bankstown.

The Sydney Metro West and Sydney Metro Western Sydney Airport are currently under construction. The former aims to connect Westmead to the Sydney CBD, via stations including Parramatta, Sydney Olympic Park, Five Dock, and the Bays Precinct, and is scheduled to be completed by 2032. The latter aims to connect St Marys and Badgerys Creek Aerotropolis via Western Sydney Airport, scheduled to be completed in 2026, aligning with the opening of the airport.

Adelaide, Brisbane, Melbourne, Perth, and Sydney's commuter systems are all partially underground and reflect some aspects of typical rapid transit systems, particularly in the city centres.

=== Intra-city public transport networks ===
The following table presents an overview of multi-modal intra-city public transport networks in Australia's larger cities. The only Australian capital cities without multi-modal networks are Darwin and Hobart. The table does not include tourist or heritage transport modes (such as the private monorail at Sea World or the tourist Victor Harbor Horse Drawn Tram).

City	Overview	Integrated network name	Buses	Bus rapid transit (BRT)	Urban rail/Commuter rail	Light rail	Watercraft	Rapid transit
Adelaide	Public transport in Adelaide	Adelaide Metro	Yes	Yes	Yes	Yes		
Brisbane	Public transport in Brisbane	Translink	Yes	Yes	Yes		Yes	
Canberra	Public transport in Canberra	Transport Canberra	Yes			Yes		
Darwin	Public transport in Darwin	Darwinbus	Yes				Yes	
Gold Coast	Public transport on the Gold Coast	Translink	Yes		Yes	Yes	Limited	
Hobart	Transport in Hobart	Metro Tasmania	Yes				Yes	
Melbourne	Public transport in Melbourne	Public Transport Victoria	Yes	Yes	Yes	Yes	Limited	Planned
Newcastle	Transport in Newcastle	Transport for NSW	Yes		Limited	Yes	Limited	
Perth	Public transport in Perth	Transperth	Yes		Yes		Yes	
Sydney	Public transport in Sydney	Transport for NSW	Yes	Yes	Yes	Yes	Yes	Yes
Wollongong	Transport in Wollongong	Transport for NSW	Yes		Yes			

== Intercity rail transport ==
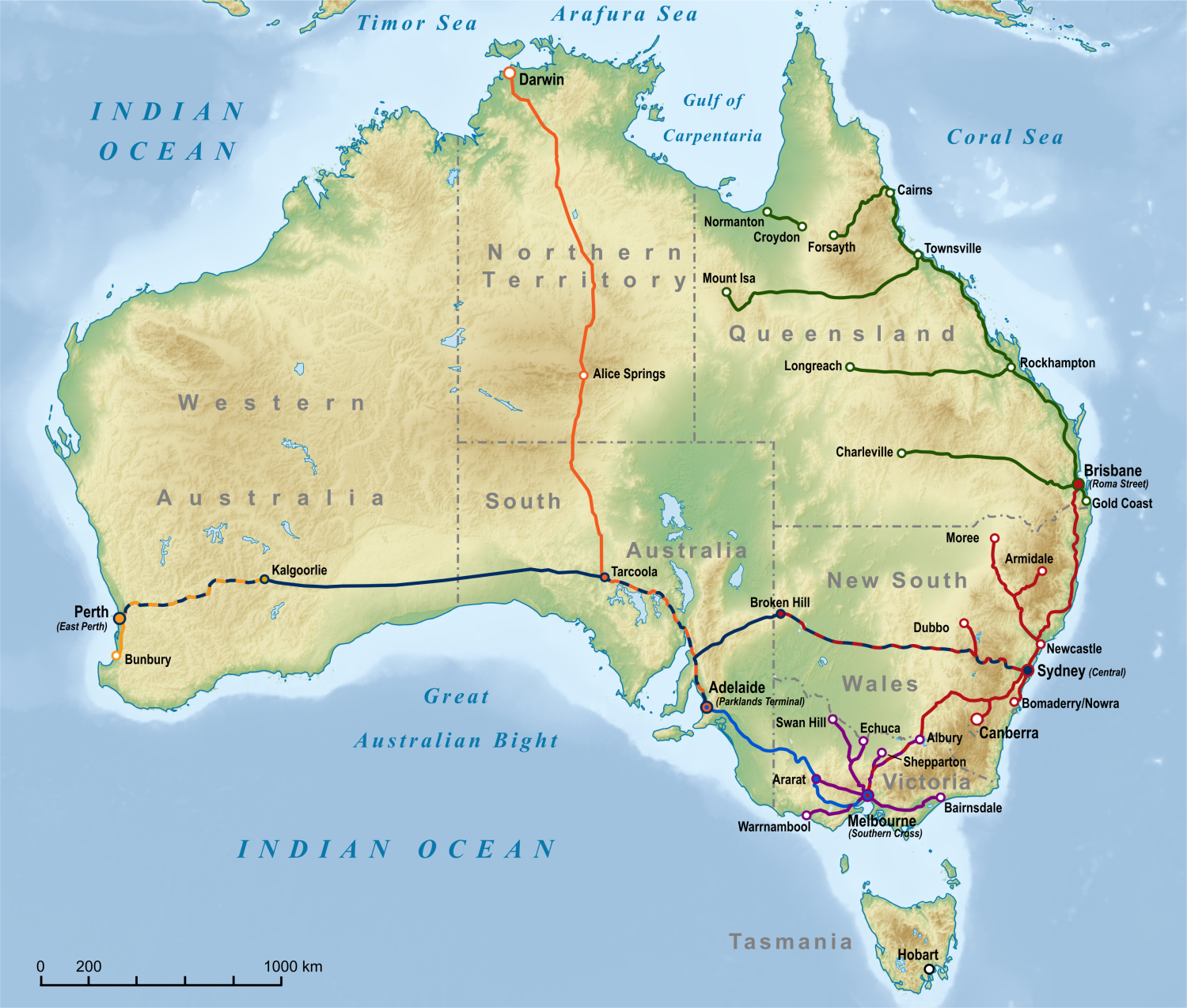
Map of passenger railway services in Australia State Government owned rail services: Queensland Rail City network and Traveltrain services NSW TrainLink services V/Line services Transwa services Journey Beyond lines: Indian Pacific The Overland The Ghan

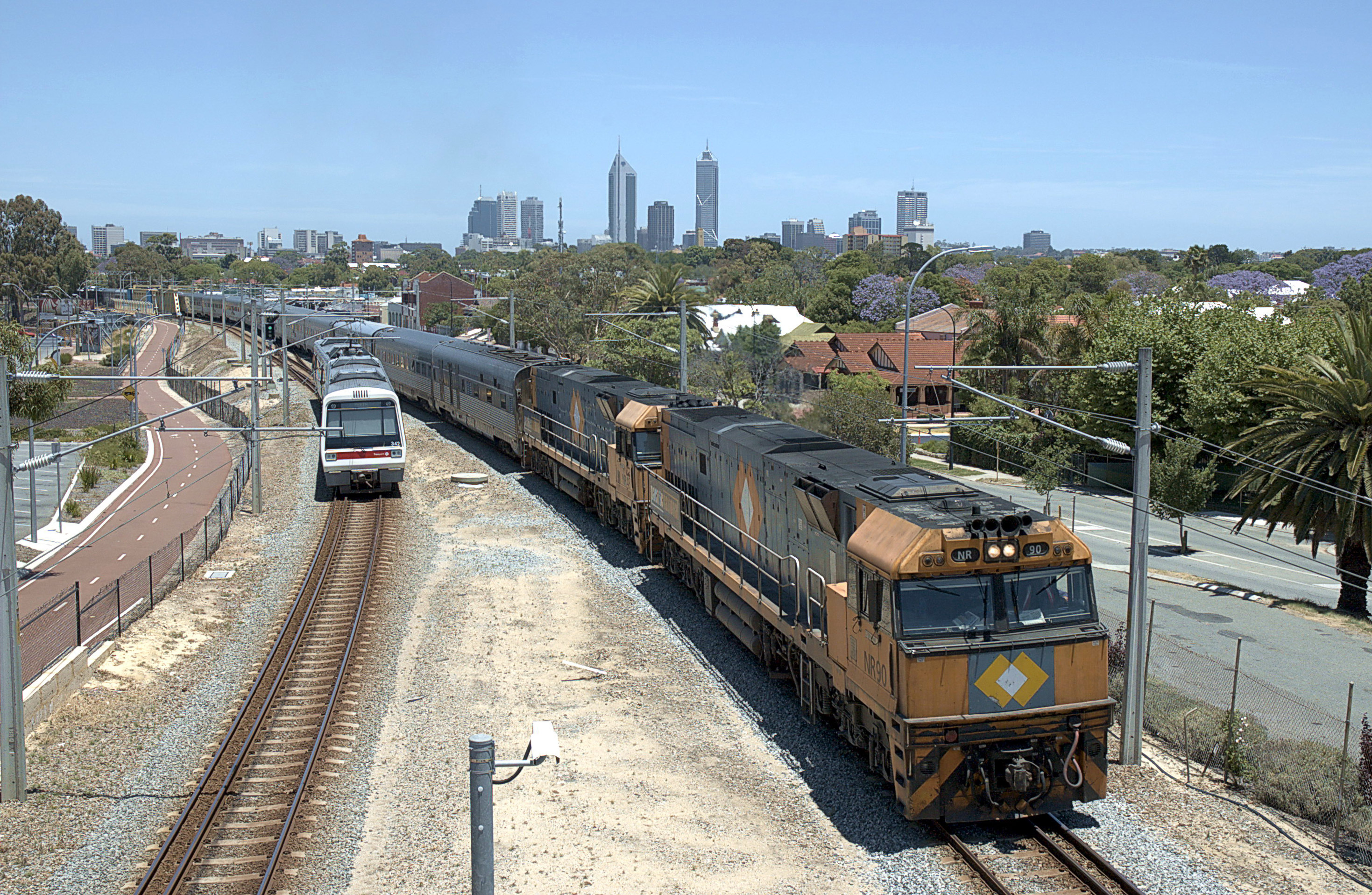
The Indian Pacific in Perth

The railway network is large, comprising a total of 33,819 km (2,540 km electrified) of track: 3,719 km broad gauge, 15,422 km standard gauge, 14,506 km narrow gauge and 172 km dual gauge. Rail transport started in the various colonies on different dates. Privately owned railways started the first lines, and struggled to succeed on a remote, huge, and sparsely populated continent, and government railways dominated. Although the various colonies had been advised by London to choose a common gauge, the colonies ended up with different gauges.

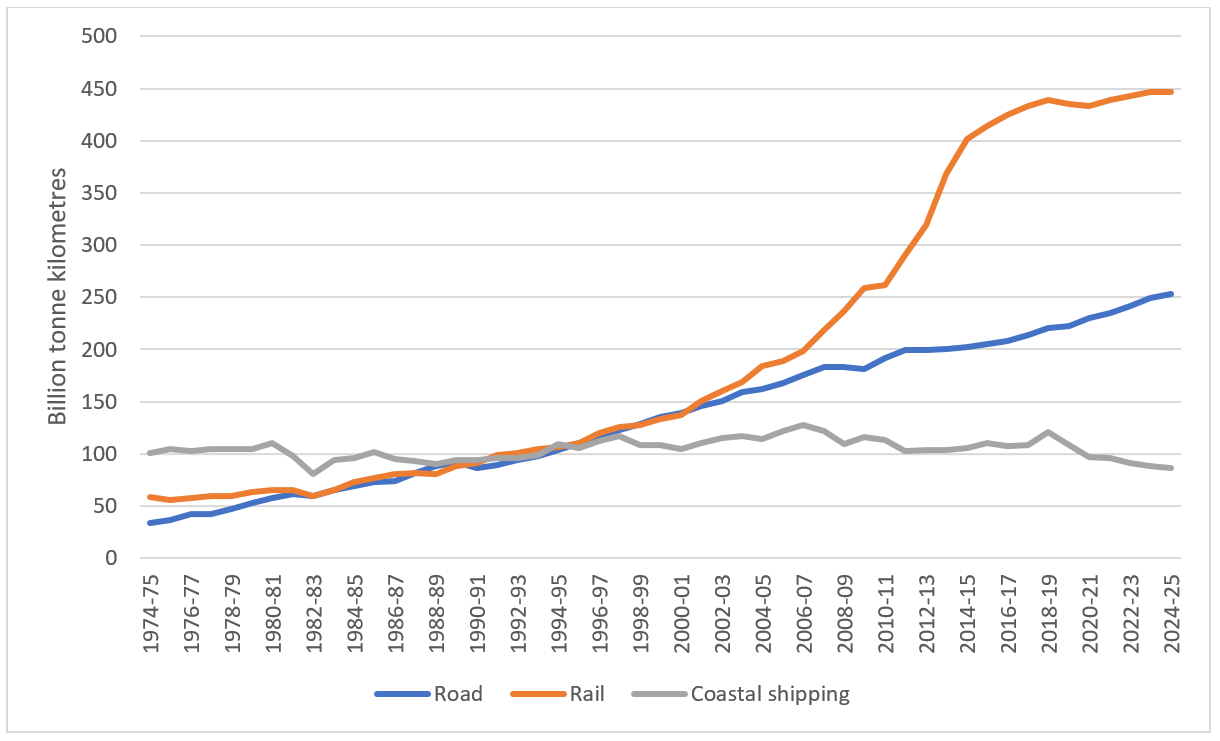
Estimated freight transport volumes by mode (billion tonne-kilometres)

The percentage of freight carried by rail has increased sharply this century. Rail accounts for more than a half of Australian freight transport activity (about 57% in 2023–24, up from approximately 38% in 2003–04).

=== Inter-state rail services ===
Journey Beyond operates four trains: the Indian Pacific (Sydney-Adelaide-Perth), The Ghan (Adelaide-Alice Springs-Darwin), The Overland (Melbourne-Adelaide), and the Great Southern (Brisbane-Melbourne-Adelaide). NSW Government owned NSW TrainLink services link Brisbane, Canberra, Melbourne, Dubbo, Broken Hill, Armidale, Moree and Griffith to Sydney. Since the extension of the Ghan from Alice Springs to Darwin was completed in 2004, all mainland Australian capital cities are linked by standard gauge rail, for the first time.

=== Intra-state and city rail services ===
There are various state and city rail services operated by a combination of government and private entities, the most prominent of these include V/Line (regional trains and coaches in Victoria); Metro Trains Melbourne (suburban services in Melbourne); NSW TrainLink (regional trains and coaches in New South Wales); Sydney Trains (suburban services in Sydney); Queensland Rail (QR) operating long-distance Traveltrain services and the City network in South-East Queensland, and Transwa operating train and bus services in Western Australia.

In Tasmania, TasRail operates a short-haul narrow gauge freight system, that carries inter-modal and bulk mining goods. TasRail is owned by the Government of Tasmania and is going through significant below and above rail upgrades with new locomotives and wagons entering service. Significant bridge and sleeper renewal have also occurred. The Tasmanian Government also operates the West Coast Wilderness Railway as a tourist venture over an isolated length of track on Tasmania's West Coast.

=== Mining railways ===
Six heavy-duty mining railways carry iron ore to ports in the northwest of Western Australia. These railways carry no other traffic and are isolated by deserts from all other railways. The lines are standard gauge and are built to the heaviest US standards. Each line is operated by one of either BHP, Rio Tinto, Fortescue and Hancock Prospecting.

A common carrier railway was proposed to serve the port of Oakajee Port just north of Geraldton, but this was later cancelled after a collapse in the iron ore price.

=== Cane railways ===
In Queensland, 19 sugar mills are serviced by ~3,000 km of narrow gauge (2 ft / 610 mm gauge) cane tramways that deliver sugar cane to the mills.

== Pipelines ==
There are several pipeline systems including:

- Crude oil: 2,500 km
- Petroleum products: 500 km
- Natural gas: 5,600 km
- Water
  - Perth to Kalgoorlie - Goldfields Water Supply Scheme
  - Morgan on the Murray River to Whyalla, Port Lincoln - Morgan–Whyalla pipeline
  - Mannum on the Murray River to Adelaide - Mannum–Adelaide pipeline
  - Waranga Western Channel, near Colbinabbin to Bendigo and Ballarat - Goldfields Superpipe

Projects under construction or planned:
Victoria

- Goulburn River to Sugarloaf Reservoir, Melbourne (North South Pipeline, alternatively called the Sugarloaf Pipeline) - was connected to Melbourne in February 2010.
- Wimmera-Mallee Pipeline - construction commenced in November 2006 and was completed in April 2010.
- Melbourne to Geelong Pipeline - construction was completed in March 2012.
- Rocklands Reservoir to Grampian Headworks Pipeline (Hamilton - Grampians Pipeline) - construction commenced December 2008, expected completion in 2010.

== Waterways ==
Between 1850 and 1940, paddle steamers were used extensively on the Murray-Darling Basin to transport produce, especially wool and wheat, to river ports such as Echuca, Mannum and Goolwa. However, the water levels of the inland waterways are highly unreliable, making the rivers impassable for large parts of the year. A system of locks was created largely to overcome this variability, but the steamers were unable to compete with rail, and later, road transport. Traffic on inland waterways is now largely restricted to private recreational craft.

== Ports and harbours ==
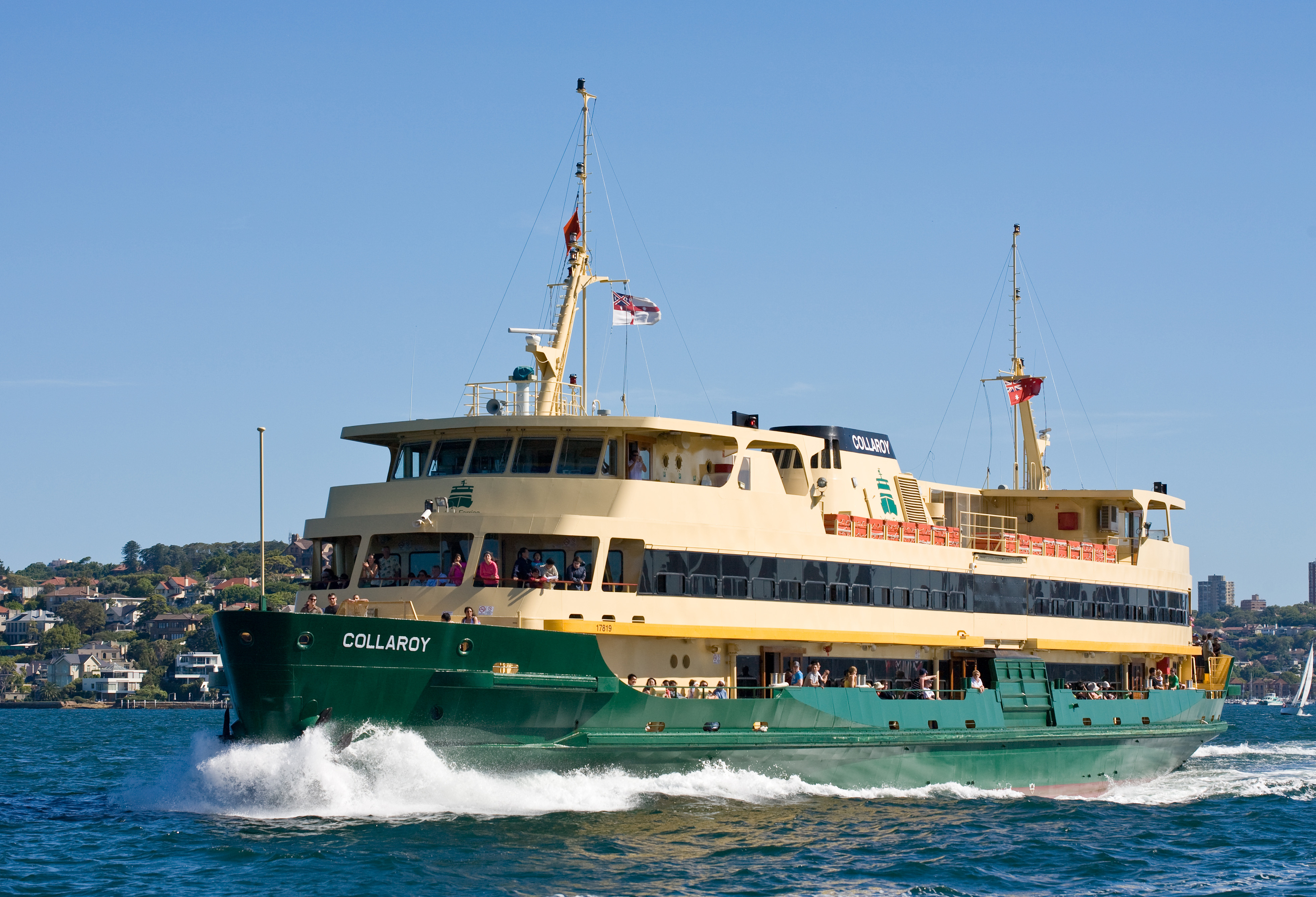
A Freshwater-class Sydney ferry

Total employment in the water transport sector (thousands of people) since 1984

=== Mainland ===
==== General ====
- Adelaide, Brisbane, Cairns, Darwin, Fremantle, Geelong, Gladstone, Port Lincoln, Mackay, Melbourne, Newcastle, Portland, Sydney, Townsville, Wollongong

==== Iron ore ====
- Dampier
- Port Hedland
- Geraldton
- Oakajee - proposed 2006
- Esperance
- Port Lincoln - possible 2007

=== Tasmania ===
- Burnie
- Devonport
- Launceston
- Hobart

== Merchant marine vessels ==
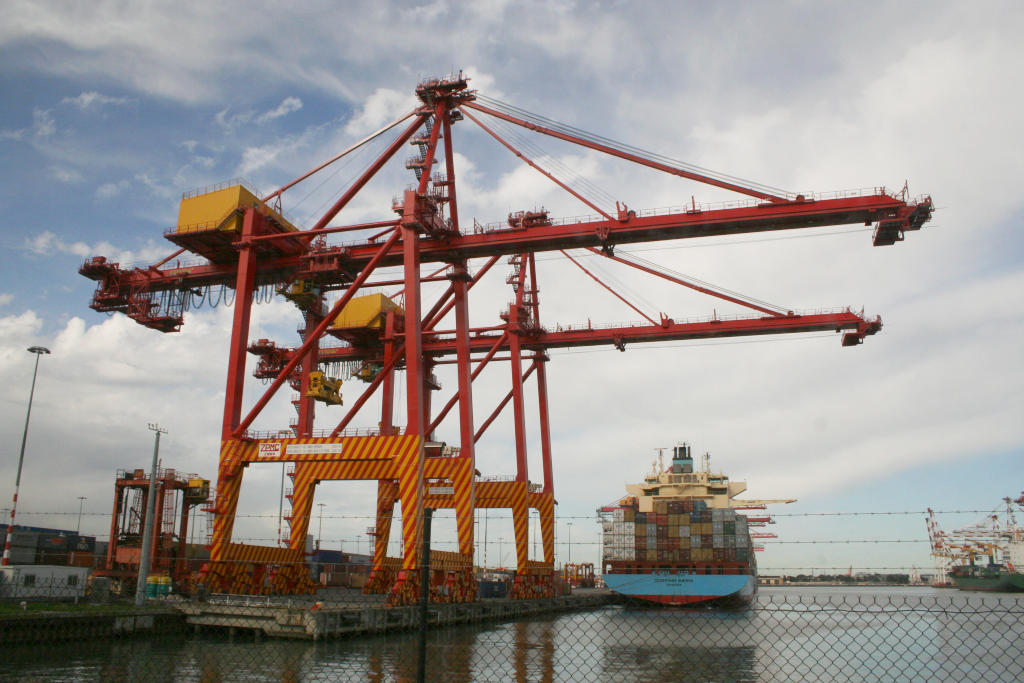
A container crane and ship at the Port of Melbourne

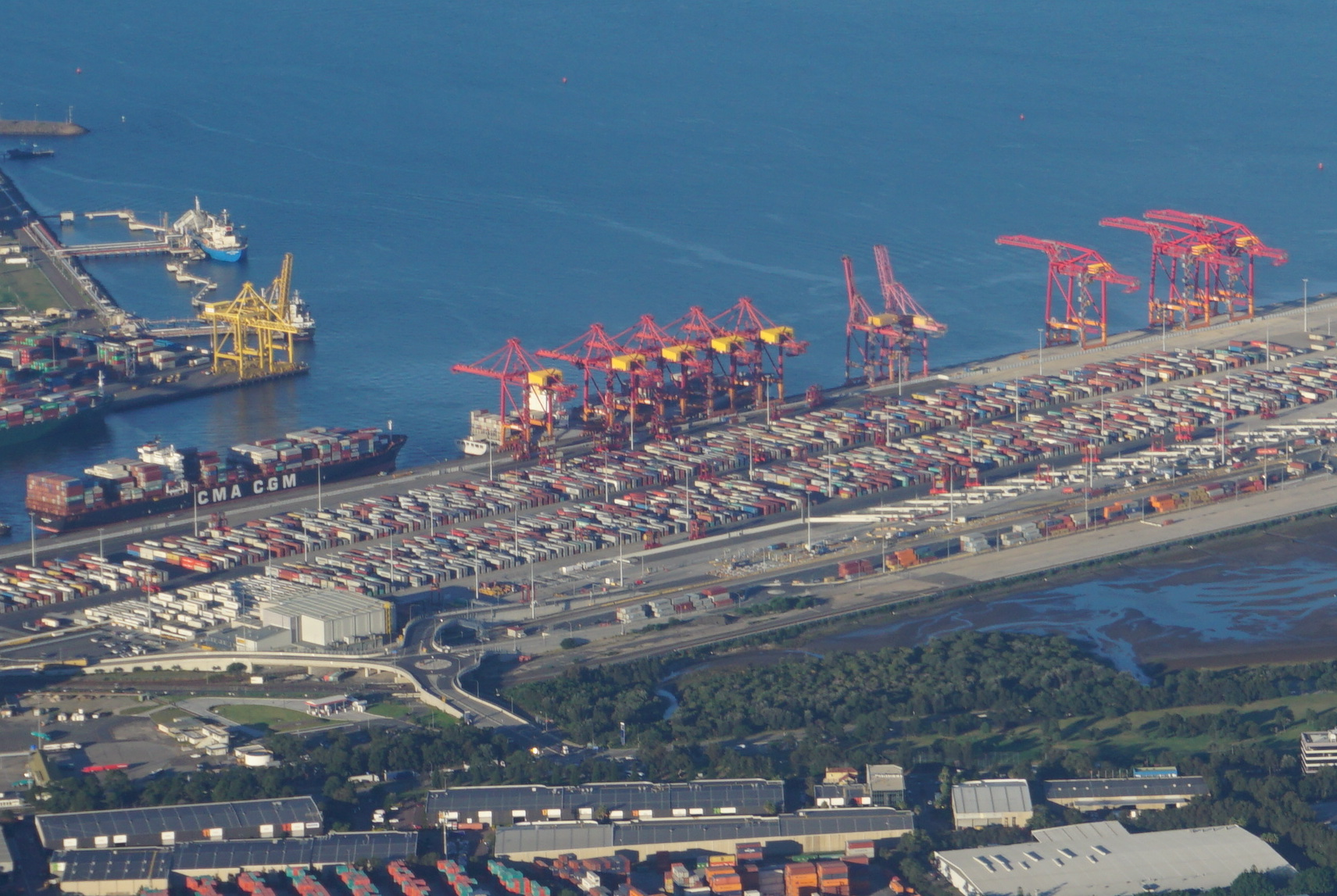
Port Botany, Sydney

In 2006, the Australian fleet consisted of 53 ships of 1,000 gross tonnage or over. The use of foreign registered ships to carry Australian cargoes between Australian ports is permitted under a permit scheme, with either Single Voyage Permit (SVP) or a Continuous Voyage Permit (CVP) being issued to ships. Between 1996 and 2002 the number of permits issued has increased by about 350 per cent.

Over recent years the number of Australian registered and flagged ships has greatly declined, from 75 ships in 1996 to less than 40 in 2007, by 2009 the number is now approaching 30. Marine unions blame the decline on the shipping policy of the Howard government which permitted foreign ships to carry coastal traffic.

There have also been cases where locally operated ships have an Australian flag from the vessel, registering it overseas under a flag of convenience, then hiring foreign crews who earn up to about half the monthly rate of Australian sailors. Such moves were supported by the Howard government but opposed by maritime unions and the Australian Council of Trade Unions. The registration of the ships overseas also meant the earnings of the ships are not subject to Australian corporate taxation laws.

== Aviation ==
Total monthly arrivals to Australia since 1976

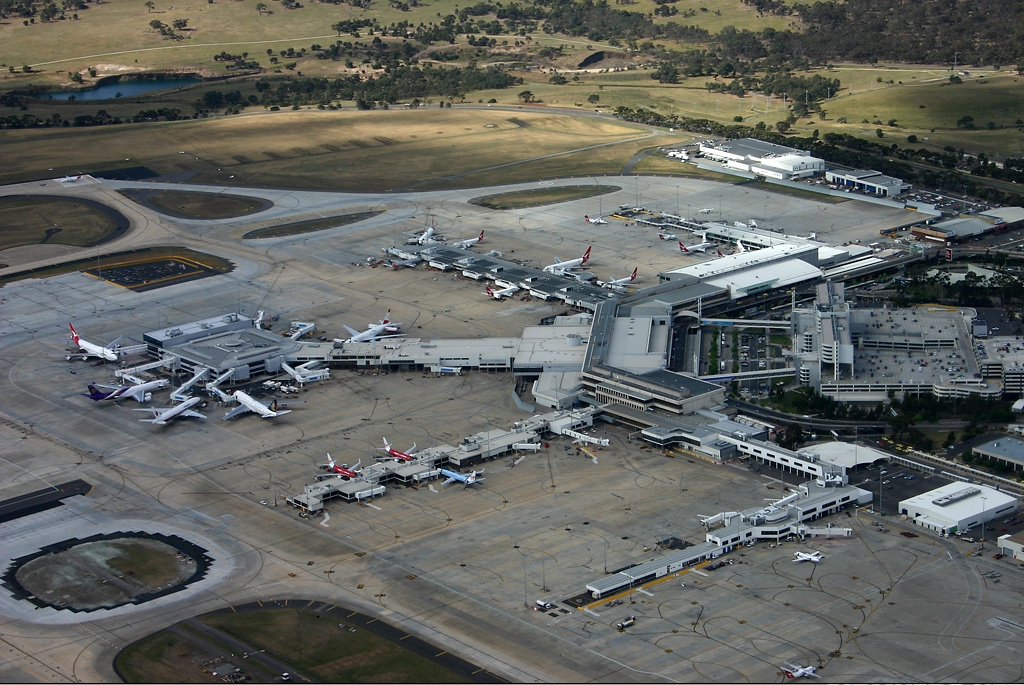
Melbourne Airport

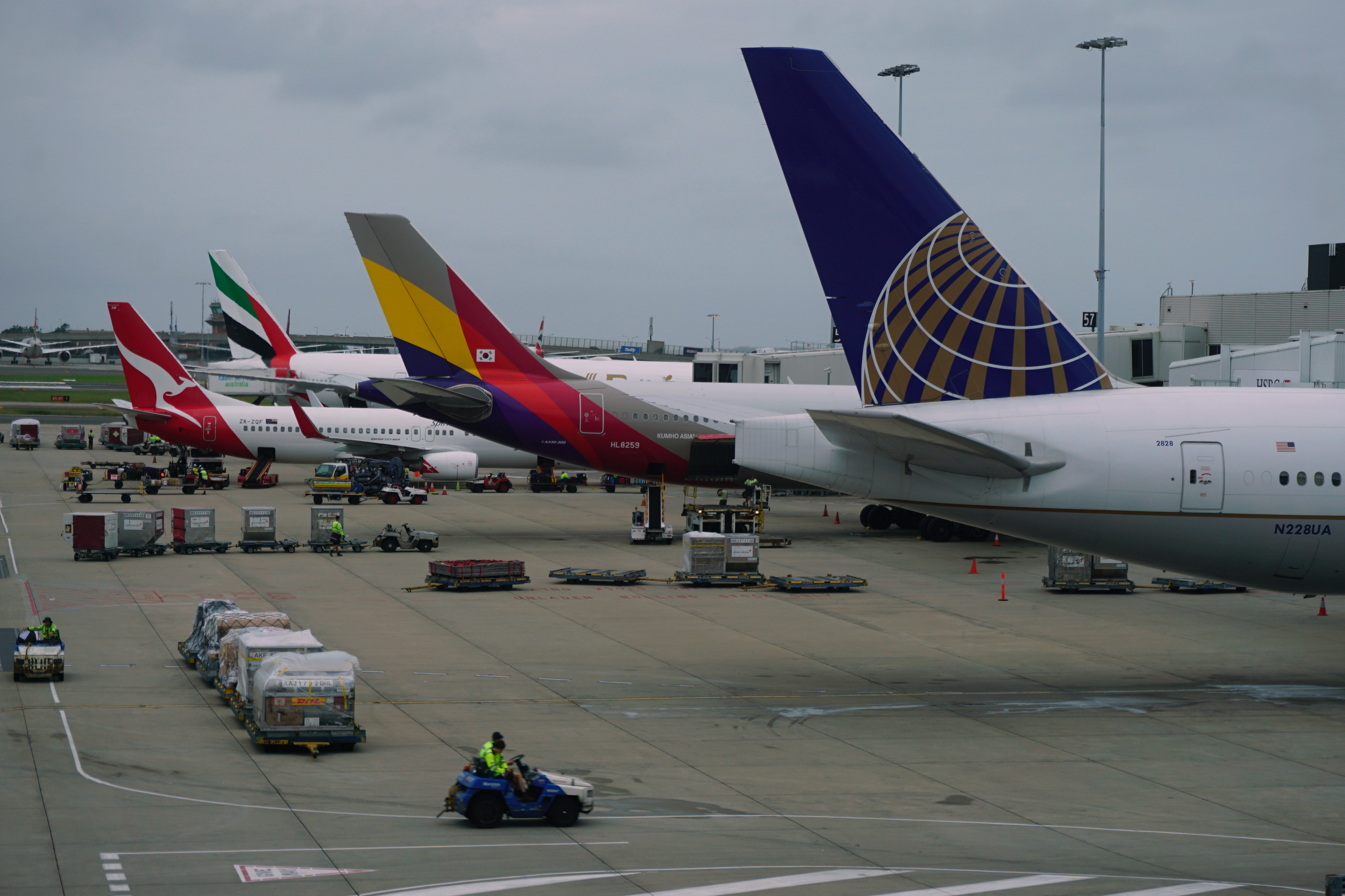
Sydney Airport

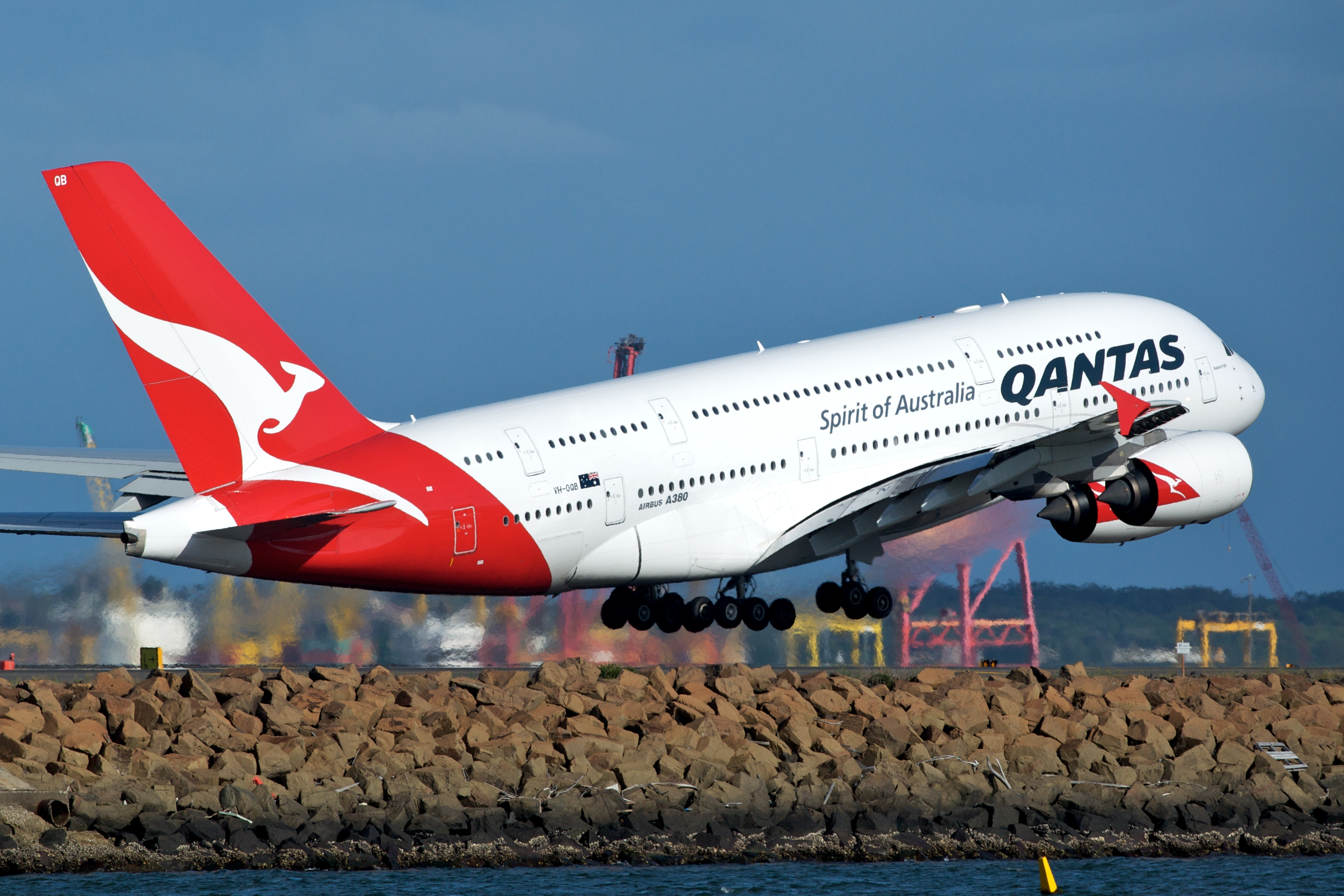
Qantas Airbus A380 taking off at Sydney Airport

Qantas is the flag carrier of Australia. Australian National Airways was the predominant domestic carrier from the mid-1930s to the early 1950s. After World War II, Qantas was nationalised and its domestic operations were transferred to Trans Australia Airlines in 1946. The Two Airlines Policy was formally established in 1952 to ensure the viability of both airlines. However, ANA's leadership was quickly eroded by TAA, and it was acquired by Ansett Airways in 1957. The duopoly continued for the next four decades. In the mid-1990s TAA was merged with Qantas and later privatised. Ansett collapsed in September 2001. In the following years, Virgin Australia became a challenger to Qantas. Both companies launched low-cost subsidiaries Jetstar and Tigerair Australia respectively.

Overseas flights from Australia to the United Kingdom via the Eastern Hemisphere are known as the Kangaroo Route, whereas flights via the Western Hemisphere are known as the Southern Cross Route. In 1948, the first commercial flight from Australia to Africa was flown by Qantas, launching what is known as the Wallaby Route. In 1954, the first flight from Australia to North America was completed, as a 60-passenger Qantas aircraft connected Sydney with San Francisco and Vancouver, having fuel stops at Fiji, Canton Island and Hawaii. In November 1982, a Pan Am 747SP flew the first non-stop commercial flight from Los Angeles to Sydney. A non-stop flight between Australia and Europe was first completed in March 2018 from Perth to London.

There are many airports around Australia paved or unpaved. A 2004 estimate put the number of airports at 448. The busiest airports in Australia are:

1. Sydney Airport Sydney, New South Wales SYD
2. Melbourne Airport Melbourne, Victoria MEL
3. Brisbane Airport Brisbane, Queensland BNE
4. Perth Airport Perth, Western Australia PER
5. Adelaide Airport Adelaide, South Australia ADL
6. Gold Coast Airport Gold Coast, Queensland OOL
7. Cairns Airport Cairns, Queensland CNS
8. Canberra Airport Canberra, Australian Capital Territory CBR
9. Hobart Airport Hobart, Tasmania HBA
10. Darwin International Airport, Northern Territory DRW
11. Townsville Airport Townsville, Queensland TSV

=== Airports by runway length ===
Length	Paved	Unpaved	Total
Over 3,047 m (10,000 ft)	10	—	10
2,438 to 3,047 m (8,000 to 10,000 ft)	12	—	12
1,524 to 2,437 m (5,000 to 8,000 ft)	131	17	148
914 to 1,523 m (3,000 to 5,000 ft)	139	112	251
Under 914 m (3,000 ft)	13‡	14	27
Total	305	143	448

‡ 2004 estimate

== Environmental impact ==
The environmental impact of transport in Australia is considerable. In 2009, transport emissions made up 15.3% of Australia's total greenhouse gas emissions. Between 1990 and 2009, transport emissions grew by 34.6%, the second-highest growth rate in emissions after stationary energy.

The Australian Energy Regulator and state agencies such as the New South Wales Independent Pricing and Regulatory Tribunal set and regulate electricity prices, thereby lowering production and consumer cost.

== See also ==
- Bullet Train for Australia – Defunct political party in Australia
- Cycling in Australia
- Economic history of Australia
- High-speed rail in Australia
- Inland Rail
- Lonie Report – Rail review in Victoria, Australia
- Regional Rail Revival project – Railway infrastructure project in Victoria, Australia
- Sydney Monorail (1988–2013)
- Trams in Australia
- Transport law in Australia
