= List of airports by ICAO code: YR-YZ =

List of airports by ICAO code: A - B - C - D - EB-EG - EH-EY - FA-FM - FN-FZ - G - H - ~~I~~ - J - KA-KH - KI-KP - KR-KZ - LA-LJ - LK-LZ - M - N - O - P - Q - R - SA-SC - SD-SH - SI - SJ - SK-SM - SN-SP - SQ - SS-SU - SV-SY - T - U - V - W - ~~X~~ - YA-YG - YH-YQ - YR-YZ - Z

Also see airport category and list.

== YR ==
ICAO	IATA	Airport name	Community	Coordinates	Notes
YRAC		Ravensworth CHPP Heliport	Liddell, New South Wales	32°24′11″S 151°00′58″E	
YRAG		Raglan Airstrip	Raglan, Victoria	37°22′39″S 143°18′20″E	
YRAK		Ranku Airstrip	Bathurst Island, Tiwi Islands, Northern Territory	11°37′12″S 130°17′50″E	
YRAM		Raymore Homestead Airstrip	Eromanga, Queensland	26°08′11″S 143°01′52″E	
YRAP		Raddison Pier Seaplane Base	Cairns, Queensland	16°55′10″S 145°47′00″E	
YRAR		Rural Air Work Airstrip	Moree, New South Wales	29°18′20″S 149°41′52″E	
YRAT		Abrolhos Rat Island Airstrip	Rat Island, Western Australia	28°43′11″S 113°47′04″E	
YRAW		Rawlinna Airstrip	Rawlinna, Western Australia	31°00′47″S 125°19′37″E	
YRAY	RSE	Rose Bay Water Airport	Rose Bay, New South Wales	33°52′12″S 151°15′47″E	
YRBB		Rainbow Beach Airstrip	Inskip, Queensland	25°51′08″S 153°04′09″E	
YRBC		Royal Brisbane Hospital Charlie Heliport	Herston, Queensland	27°27′00″S 153°01′39″E	
YRBD		Rosebud Heliport	Rosebud, Victoria	38°21′14″S 144°54′21″E	
YRBE		Robe Aerodrome	Robe, South Australia	37°10′35″S 139°48′16″E	
YRBH		Royal Brisbane Hospital Alpha Heliport	Herston, Queensland	27°26′49″S 153°01′42″E	
YRBK		Robertson Barracks Heliport	Holtze, Northern Territory	12°25′32″S 130°58′24″E	Military
YRBM		Redbank Mine Airstrip	Calvert, Northern Territory	17°11′27″S 137°46′04″E	
YRBN		Robertson Airstrip	Carrington Falls, New South Wales	34°38′42″S 150°38′32″E	
YRBR		Robinson River Airstrip	Calvert, Northern Territory	16°43′06″S 136°56′42″E	
YRBT		Rabbit Flat Airstrip	Tanami, Northern Territory	20°11′25″S 130°00′45″E	
YRBW		Rainbow Airstrip	Rainbow, Victoria	35°54′28″S 141°58′40″E	
YRBY		Rokeby Airstrip	Coen, Queensland	13°38′36″S 142°38′28″E	
YRCD		Rochedale Heliport	Rochedale, Queensland	27°34′44″S 153°07′51″E	
YRDA		Yardea Aerodrome	Yardea, South Australia	32°24′36″S 135°29′06″E	
YRDF		Robinson Dairy Farm Heliport	Moggill, Queensland	27°34′47″S 152°51′24″E	
YRDH		Red Hill South Heliport	Red Hill, Victoria	38°22′08″S 145°00′43″E	
YRDM		Redmont Airstrip	Marble Bar, Western Australia	21°58′37″S 119°01′01″E	
YRDN		Red Dome Mine Airstrip	Chillagoe, Queensland	17°07′31″S 144°23′35″E	
YRDP		Reindeer Platform Heliport	Offshore Western Australia	20°01′30″S 116°18′36″E	
YRDS		Richmond Downs Aerodrome	Richmond, Queensland	20°34′38″S 143°18′04″E	
YRDY		Reedys Airstrip	Reedy, Western Australia	27°07′28″S 118°16′46″E	
YRED		Redcliffe Airport	Redcliffe, Queensland	27°12′23″S 153°04′09″E	
YREM		Remlap Park Airstrip	Allworth, New South Wales	32°33′30″S 151°57′30″E	
YREN	RMK	Renmark Airport	Renmark, South Australia	34°11′48″S 140°40′24″E	
YRES		Retreat Homestead Airstrip	Jundah, Queensland	25°12′52″S 143°17′08″E	
YRFB		Raffles Bay Seaplane Base	Cobourg, Northern Territory	11°16′22″S 132°23′07″E	
YRFD		Richfield Airstrip	Longreach, Queensland	22°46′28″S 144°00′32″E	
YRHL		Red Hill Station Airstrip	Cane, Western Australia	21°58′10″S 116°03′45″E	
YRHO		Royal Children's Hospital Heliport	Parkville, Victoria	37°47′39″S 144°57′05″E	
YRIA		Barrkira Airstrip	East Arnhem, Northern Territory	12°00′30″S 136°28′07″E	
YRID		Riddell Airfield	Riddells Creek, Victoria	37°28′21″S 144°43′28″E	
YRIH		Richmond Heliport	Richmond, Victoria	37°49′00″S 145°00′01″E	
YRIM		Merrimba Airstrip	Marthaguy, New South Wales	31°10′41″S 147°53′53″E	
YRIN		Mount Ringwood Airstrip	Margaret River, Northern Territory	13°08′15″S 131°22′27″E	
YRIO		Ripcord Airstrip	Crowley Vale, Queensland	27°32′55″S 152°23′30″E	
YRIS		Robbins Island Airstrip	Robbins Island, Tasmania	40°41′24″S 145°01′47″E	
YRKB		Rokeby Police Academy Heliport	Rokeby, Tasmania	42°54′30″S 147°27′16″E	
YRKD	RDA	Rockhampton Downs Airport	Tablelands, Northern Territory	18°57′12″S 135°12′02″E	
YRKE		Kuruc-A-Ruc South Airstrip	Rokewood, Victoria	37°53′58″S 143°42′35″E	
YRKP		Arkapena Airstrip	Flinders Ranges, South Australia	31°40′27″S 138°38′32″E	
YRKS		Rocklands Airstrip	Camooweal, Queensland	19°52′12″S 138°06′17″E	
YRLE		Rocklea Airstrip	Rocklea Station, Western Australia	22°52′59″S 117°26′39″E	
YRLH		Riversleigh Airstrip	Lawn Hill, Queensland	19°01′45″S 138°44′16″E	
YRLL		Rolleston Airstrip	Rolleston, Queensland	24°27′36″S 148°37′37″E	
YRLO		Rollo's Airfield	Pallamana, South Australia	35°02′14″S 139°11′13″E	
YRMA		Riamukka Airstrip	Nowendoc, New South Wales	31°25′40″S 151°40′39″E	
YRMD	RCM	Richmond Airport	Richmond, Queensland	20°42′07″S 143°06′53″E	
YRMH		Royal Melbourne Hospital Heliport	Parkville, Victoria	37°47′57″S 144°57′21″E	
YRMT		Yarram Heliport	Yarram, Victoria	38°33′23″S 146°40′20″E	
YRNG	RAM	Ramingining Airport	Ramingining, Northern Territory	12°21′24″S 134°53′54″E	
YRNW		Ringwood Airstrip	Hale, Northern Territory	23°49′42″S 134°57′43″E	
YROB	ROH	Robinhood Airport	Robinhood, Queensland	18°50′55″S 143°42′40″E	
YROC		Ravensworth Open Cut Heliport	Ravensworth, New South Wales	32°26′56″S 151°01′21″E	
YROD		Round Hill Island Seaplane Base	Round Hill Island, Northern Territory	13°18′40″S 136°05′36″E	
YROE	RBU	Roebourne Airport	Roebourne, Western Australia	20°45′50″S 117°09′19″E	
YROI	RBC	Robinvale Airport	Robinvale, Victoria	34°38′36″S 142°46′14″E	
YROK		Rocky River Airstrip	Flinders Chase, South Australia	35°55′36″S 136°43′14″E	
YROL		Rolleston Open Cut Heliport	Albinia, Queensland	24°26′43″S 148°25′05″E	
YROM	RMA	Roma Airport	Roma, Queensland	26°32′42″S 148°46′29″E	
YROP		Rosalie Plains Airstrip	Rosalie Plains, Queensland	27°13′04″S 151°41′50″E	
YROS		Mount Roseby Airstrip	Cloncurry, Queensland	20°18′50″S 140°10′11″E	
YROT		Rothsay Mine Airstrip	Rothsay, Western Australia	29°17′38″S 116°53′24″E	
YROV		Ross River Airstrip	Hale, Northern Territory	23°35′53″S 134°31′11″E	
YROX		Roxborough Downs Airstrip	Georgina, Queensland	22°30′57″S 138°50′01″E	
YRPA		Royal Prince Alfred Hospital Heliport	Camperdown, New South Wales	33°53′22″S 151°11′01″E	
YRPT		Rankin Point Seaplane Base	Cox Peninsula, Northern Territory	12°41′01″S 130°35′03″E	
YRRB	RPB	Roper Bar Airport	Roper Bar, Northern Territory	14°44′05″S 134°31′32″E	
YRRG		Rhodes Ridge Airstrip	Newman, Western Australia	23°06′06″S 119°21′32″E	
YRRR		Raymangirr Airstrip	East Arnhem, Northern Territory	12°20′26″S 135°59′48″E	
YRSB		Roseberth Aerodrome	Birdsville, Queensland	25°49′32″S 139°37′38″E	
YRSH		Rosehill Heliport	Clyde, New South Wales	33°49′48″S 151°01′27″E	Closed
YRSK		Ringer Soak Airstrip	Kundat Djaru Community, Western Australia	18°47′10″S 128°37′33″E	
YRSS		Risdon Stud Airstrip	The Glen, Queensland	28°18′23″S 151°58′27″E	
YRST		Rostella Airstrip	Dilston, Tasmania	41°19′54″S 147°02′58″E	
YRSV		Rosevale Resort Airstrip	Wyandra, Queensland	27°08′43″S 145°54′39″E	
YRSW		Rushworth Heliport	Rushworth, Victoria	36°35′02″S 145°01′08″E	
YRSY		Romsey Airfield	Romsey, Victoria	37°23′30″S 144°44′18″E	
YRTH		Rothwell Airfield	Little River, Victoria	37°55′01″S 144°29′01″E	
YRTI	RTS	Rottnest Island Airport	Rottnest Island, Western Australia	32°00′24″S 115°32′23″E	
YRTN		Railton Heliport	Railton, Tasmania	41°20′22″S 146°25′41″E	
YRTP	RTP	Rutland Plains Airport	Rutland Plains, Queensland	15°38′36″S 141°50′36″E	
YRUD		Rudal River Aerodrome	Telfer, Western Australia	22°33′29″S 122°08′53″E	
YRUG		Rugby Airstrip	Rugby, New South Wales	34°23′30″S 148°58′30″E	Closed
YRUL		Rurrangala Airstrip	East Arnhem, Northern Territory	12°54′43″S 136°15′08″E	
YRUN		Running Creek Airstrip	Mount Alma, Queensland	24°05′37″S 150°49′07″E	Closed
YRUR		Rurruwuy Airstrip	East Arnhem, Northern Territory	12°11′34″S 136°17′38″E	
YRUS		Rushy Lagoon Airstrip	Rushy Lagoon, Tasmania	40°53′37″S 147°59′24″E	Closed
YRVE		Riveren Airstrip	Buchanan, Northern Territory	17°54′02″S 130°12′49″E	
YRVL		Rose Vale Airstrip	Illabo, New South Wales	34°50′58″S 147°46′49″E	
YRVO		Ravenshoe Heliport	Ravenshoe, Queensland	17°36′28″S 145°28′57″E	Closed
YRVQ		Roper River Aqua Farm Heliport	Limmen, Northern Territory	14°45′37″S 135°12′29″E	
YRVW		Ravenswood Airstrip	Ravenswood, Queensland	20°06′05″S 146°54′32″E	
YRWA		Rawlinna Station Aerodrome	Rawlinna, Western Australia	31°01′51″S 125°11′41″E	
YRWF		Rowland Flat Airstrip	Rowland Flat, South Australia	34°33′49″S 138°56′59″E	
YRWH		Ravensworth Airstrip	Maude, New South Wales	34°38′59″S 144°19′11″E	
YRWK		Randwick Heliport	Randwick, New South Wales	33°55′53″S 151°14′23″E	Closed
YRWS		Rowsley Heliport	Rowsley, Victoria	37°42′39″S 144°22′41″E	
YRXB		Roxby Downs Station Aerodrome	Roxby Downs Station, South Australia	30°42′30″S 136°42′38″E	Military
YRXN		Rexton Airstrip	Wondalli, Queensland	28°24′52″S 150°31′52″E	
YRYA		Ryans Point Heliport	Recherche, Tasmania	43°32′28″S 146°53′41″E	
YRYH	RHL	Roy Hill Station Airport	Roy Hill, Western Australia	22°37′33″S 119°57′33″E	
YRYK		Rawnsley Park Airstrip	Flinders Ranges, South Australia	31°39′13″S 138°36′34″E	
YRYL		Rylstone Airpark	Rylstone, New South Wales	32°46′15″S 149°59′36″E	
YRYP		Rayner Place Helipad	Yass, New South Wales	34°51′46″S 148°56′02″E	
YRYW		Raywood Aerodrome	Raywood, Victoria	36°32′30″S 144°14′28″E	

== YS ==
ICAO	IATA	Airport name	Community	Coordinates	Notes
YSAB		Simpson Army Barracks Heliport	Yallambie, Victoria	37°43′29″S 145°05′15″E	Closed
YSAC		Sandy Cape Heliport	West Coast, Tasmania	41°25′19″S 144°45′46″E	Closed
YSAD		Savannah Downs Airstrip	Taldora, Queensland	19°27′32″S 141°46′48″E	
YSAE		Sattler Heliport	Freds Pass, Northern Territory	12°32′03″S 131°03′03″E	
YSAF		Scampton Airfield	Gunnedah, New South Wales	30°58′20″S 150°11′00″E	
YSAG		Sandringham Station Airstrip	Bedourie, Queensland	24°03′17″S 139°04′41″E	
YSAH		Sandhill Airstrip	Newman, Western Australia	22°47′41″S 119°37′33″E	Closed
YSAI		Saipem Airstrip	Mereenie, Northern Territory	23°42′00″S 131°52′01″E	Closed
YSAM		Samarai Airstrip	Balgowan, Queensland	27°14′26″S 151°40′49″E	
YSAN	NDS	Sandstone Airport	Sandstone, Western Australia	27°58′48″S 119°17′49″E	
YSAR		Mount Sarah Airfield	Mount Sarah, South Australia	27°02′35″S 135°14′31″E	
YSAS		SAS-7 Heliport	North Adelaide, South Australia	34°54′37″S 138°36′37″E	Closed
YSAW		Sawfish Camp Airstrip	Limmen, Northern Territory	15°07′43″S 135°00′36″E	
YSAY		Sand Cay Seaplane Base	Coral Sea Islands	15°54′30″S 146°47′54″E	
YSBE		Sunbury East Airstrip	Sunbury, Victoria	37°31′47″S 144°44′53″E	
YSBG		Strathbogie Airfield	Strathbogie, Victoria	36°50′23″S 145°45′14″E	
YSBK	BWU	Bankstown Airport	Bankstown, New South Wales	33°55′30″S 150°59′18″E	
YSBO		Stradbroke Airstrip	Dajarra, Queensland	21°34′45″S 139°42′18″E	
YSBY		Seabuoy Heliport	Offshore Dampier Archipelago, Western Australia	20°25′48″S 116°42′51″E	
YSCA		Scotia Sanctuary Aerodrome	Scotia, New South Wales	33°12′18″S 141°10′01″E	
YSCB	CBR	Canberra Airport	Canberra, Australian Capital Territory	35°18′25″S 149°11′42″E	
YSCC		Scott Creek Airport	Clarendon, South Australia	35°05′30″S 138°39′41″E	
YSCD		Carosue Dam Airport	Cundeelee / Kurnalpi, Western Australia	30°10′25″S 122°19′20″E	
YSCK		Salt Creek Heliport	Salt Creek, South Australia	36°07′24″S 139°38′55″E	
YSCN	CDU	Camden Airport	Camden, New South Wales	34°02′24″S 150°41′12″E	
YSCO	NSO	Scone Airport	Scone, New South Wales	32°02′14″S 150°49′56″E	
YSCP		Caribbean Park Heliport	Scoresby, Victoria	37°54′32″S 145°13′24″E	
YSCR	SQC	Southern Cross Airport	Southern Cross, Western Australia	31°14′25″S 119°21′35″E	
YSCT		South Chittering Heliport	Bullsbrook, Western Australia	31°38′55″S 116°07′36″E	Closed
YSDL		Sudley Airstrip	Mission River, Queensland	12°43′01″S 142°22′00″E	
YSDN		Soudan Station Airstrip	Ranken, Northern Territory	20°02′38″S 137°01′09″E	
YSDU	DBO	Dubbo Airport	Dubbo, New South Wales	32°13′00″S 148°34′30″E	
YSDW		Strathdownie Airstrip	Strathdownie, Victoria	37°43′56″S 141°07′49″E	Closed
YSEA		Sedan Aerodrome	Sedan, South Australia	34°34′08″S 139°20′03″E	
YSED		Stuart Meadows Aerodrome	Leonora, Western Australia	28°41′03″S 120°58′08″E	
YSEI		Seisia Seaplane Base	Seisia, Queensland	10°50′48″S 142°21′54″E	
YSEK		Stuarts Creek Airstrip	Orallo, Queensland	26°17′24″S 148°27′39″E	
YSEN		Serpentine Airfield	Hopeland, Western Australia	32°23′42″S 115°52′24″E	
YSER		Starcke Airstrip	Starcke, Queensland	14°49′43″S 144°57′00″E	Closed
YSEW		Stewarts Airstrip	Sandy Beach, New South Wales	30°09′21″S 153°09′53″E	
YSEZ		Saumarez Reef Seaplane Base	Coral Sea Islands	21°51′26″S 153°38′48″E	
YSFG		Stonefield Gliding Aerodrome	Steinfeld, South Australia	34°20′37″S 139°18′36″E	
YSFI		Sandfire Airstrip	Eighty Mile Beach, Western Australia	19°46′19″S 121°05′26″E	
YSFS		Schofields Airstrip	Nirimba Fields, New South Wales	33°43′17″S 150°52′23″E	
YSFY		Sandfly Airstrip	Sandfly, Tasmania	42°58′56″S 147°12′33″E	
YSGD		Strathgordon Airstrip	Edward River, Queensland	14°47′40″S 142°25′48″E	
YSGE	SGO	St George Airport	St George, Queensland	28°03′00″S 148°35′42″E	
YSGL		Strathguyle Airstrip	Garah, New South Wales	29°05′12″S 149°22′47″E	
YSGN		Strathgordon Heliport	Strathgordon, Tasmania	42°46′11″S 146°02′47″E	
YSGR		South Grafton Airstrip	South Grafton, New South Wales	29°42′32″S 152°55′42″E	
YSGT		Singleton Airstrip	Whittingham, New South Wales	32°36′03″S 151°11′34″E	
YSGW	ZGL	South Galway Airport	South Galway Station, Queensland	25°40′29″S 142°05′24″E	
YSHA		Shady Camp Airstrip	Point Stuart, Northern Territory	12°28′54″S 131°43′42″E	
YSHD		Sheffield Heliport	Sheffield, Tasmania	41°23′10″S 146°19′31″E	
YSHG	SGP	Shay Gap Airport	Shay Gap, Western Australia	20°25′30″S 120°08′24″E	
YSHK	MJK	Shark Bay Airport	Denham, Western Australia	25°53′36″S 113°34′36″E	
YSHL	WOL	Shellharbour Airport	City of Shellharbour, Shellharbour, New South Wales	34°33′40″S 150°47′19″E	Formerly YWOL
YSHN		Shannon River Airstrip	Shannon, Western Australia	34°44′46″S 116°29′30″E	
YSHR	WSY	Whitsunday Airport	Shute Harbour, Airlie Beach, Queensland	20°16′36″S 148°45′19″E	
YSHS		Stenhouse Bay Seaplane Base	Inneston, South Australia	35°16′45″S 136°56′39″E	
YSHT	SHT	Shepparton Airport	Shepparton, Victoria	36°25′44″S 145°23′33″E	
YSHW		Holsworthy Barracks	Holsworthy, New South Wales	33°59′42″S 150°57′06″E	
YSIA		Siam Aerodrome	Siam, South Australia	32°33′27″S 136°42′32″E	
YSIE		Shirley Airstrip	Torrens Creek, Queensland	21°30′35″S 144°59′22″E	
YSII	SBR	Saibai Island Airport	Saibai Island, Torres Strait Islands, Queensland	09°22′42″S 142°37′30″E	
YSKF		Starke Field Airstrip	Woodstock, Queensland	19°35′12″S 146°46′50″E	
YSKI		Ski Beach Airstrip	Gove Peninsula, Northern Territory	12°13′23″S 136°42′19″E	
YSKR		Skardon River Airstrip	Mapoon, Queensland	11°51′59″S 142°00′32″E	
YSLD		Sutherland Station Airstrip	Cambridge, Queensland	20°12′23″S 142°25′36″E	
YSLE		St Leonards Airfield	St Leonards, Victoria	38°10′09″S 144°41′19″E	
YSLG		Silent Grove Airstrip	Wunaamin Miliwundi Ranges, Western Australia	17°03′24″S 125°14′41″E	
YSLI		Seal Island Heliport	Seal Island, Victoria	38°55′31″S 146°39′41″E	
YSLK		Sea Lake Airport	Sea Lake, Victoria	35°31′54″S 142°53′24″E	
YSLN		Strathleven Airstrip	Palmer, Queensland	15°54′05″S 143°23′06″E	
YSLO		The Silos Heliport	Invermay, Tasmania	41°25′50″S 147°07′40″E	
YSLT		Sale Airstrip	Sale, Victoria	38°07′00″S 147°04′30″E	Closed
YSLV		Sylvania Homestead Airstrip	Capricorn, Western Australia	23°33′27″S 120°02′49″E	
YSLW		St Lawrence Airstrip	St Lawrence, Queensland	22°22′31″S 149°27′38″E	
YSMB	GOS	Somersby Airfield	Somersby, New South Wales	33°22′04″S 151°17′59″E	
YSMH		Samuel Hill Airfield	Shoalwater, Queensland	22°44′25″S 150°39′15″E	Military
YSMI	SIO	Smithton Airport	Smithton, Tasmania	40°50′06″S 145°05′00″E	
YSMK		Smokey Creek Aerodrome	Jambin, Queensland	24°07′30″S 150°26′52″E	
YSML		South Molle Island Seaplane Base	South Molle Island, Queensland	20°15′19″S 148°50′11″E	
YSMP	SHU	Smith Point Airport	Cobourg / Smith Point, Northern Territory	11°07′58″S 132°09′28″E	
YSMR	STH	Strathmore Station Airport	Strathmore, Queensland	17°51′46″S 142°33′28″E	
YSMT		Sunnymount Airstrip	Petford, Queensland	17°24′01″S 144°53′04″E	
YSMY		Strathmay Airstrip	Yarraden, Queensland	14°52′55″S 142°47′57″E	
YSNB		Snake Bay Airstrip	Milikapiti, Northern Territory	11°25′22″S 130°39′14″E	
YSNC		Sinclair Airstrip	Leonora, Western Australia	28°20′20″S 120°51′16″E	
YSND		Snapper Island Seaplane Base	Snapper Island, Queensland	16°17′32″S 145°29′51″E	
YSNE		Swanbourne Heliport	Campbell Barracks, Western Australia	31°58′24″S 115°45′30″E	
YSNF	NLK	Norfolk Island Airport	Norfolk Island	29°02′33″S 167°56′17″E	
YSNI		Snake Island Heliport	Snake Island, Victoria	38°43′44″S 146°30′23″E	
YSNK	SNB	Snake Bay Airport	Melville Island, Northern Territory	11°25′22″S 130°39′13″E	
YSNT		Snowtown Airstrip	Condowie, South Australia	33°48′00″S 138°22′01″E	Closed
YSNW	NOA	HMAS Albatross	Nowra, New South Wales	34°56′56″S 150°32′13″E	
YSNY		Sunnyside Airstrip	Walla Walla, New South Wales	35°45′47″S 146°54′33″E	
YSOB		Southbrook Airstrip	Southbrook, Queensland	27°40′06″S 151°43′53″E	
YSOE		South Bend Airstrip	Arcadia Valley, Queensland	25°13′22″S 148°45′32″E	Closed
YSOH		Southern Hills Aerodrome	Fraser Range, Western Australia	32°11′39″S 122°50′29″E	
YSOL	SLJ	Solomon Airport	Karijini National Park, Western Australia	22°15′19″S 117°45′43″E	
YSOP		Sydney Olympic Park Heliport	Sydney Olympic Park, New South Wales	33°51′01″S 151°03′52″E	
YSOW		Southwell Airstrip	Edward River, Queensland	14°31′13″S 142°02′39″E	
YSPE	SNH	Stanthorpe Airport	Stanthorpe, Queensland	28°37′06″S 151°59′24″E	
YSPF		Springfield Airstrip	Blackall, Queensland	24°17′53″S 144°52′42″E	
YSPI		Springsure Aerodrome	Springsure, Queensland	24°07′49″S 148°05′12″E	
YSPK	SCG	Spring Creek Airport	Shire of Etheridge, Queensland	18°37′18″S 144°34′06″E	
YSPT	SHQ	Southport Airport	Southport, Queensland	27°55′18″S 153°22′18″E	
YSPV	KSV	Springvale Airport	Springvale, Queensland	23°32′35″S 140°42′12″E	
YSPY		Spilsby Island Aerodrome	Spilsby Island, South Australia	34°39′35″S 136°20′23″E	
YSRA		Scenic Rim Airfield	Kooralbyn, Queensland	28°05′22″S 152°50′48″E	Formerly YKBN
YSRD		Sunrise Dam Airport	Sunrise Dam Gold Mine, Western Australia	29°05′54″S 122°27′18″E	
YSRG		Sunraysia Gliding Aerodrome	Koorlong, Victoria	34°15′35″S 142°03′30″E	
YSRI	XRH	RAAF Richmond	Richmond, New South Wales	33°36′11″S 150°47′02″E	
YSRK		Sherlock Bay Airstrip	Sherlock, Western Australia	20°53′57″S 117°39′10″E	Closed
YSRL		Sorell Heliport	Sorell, Tasmania	42°46′55″S 147°33′27″E	
YSRN	SRN	Strahan Airport	Strahan, Tasmania	42°09′20″S 145°17′29″E	
YSRT		Surat Airstrip	Noorindoo, Queensland	27°09′34″S 149°04′34″E	
YSSL		South Solitary Island Heliport	South Solitary Island, New South Wales	30°12′17″S 153°15′59″E	
YSSP		Skysafari Base Heliport	Yorkeys Knob, Queensland	16°50′52″S 145°42′56″E	
YSSY	SYD	Sydney Airport	Mascot, New South Wales	33°56′46″S 151°10′38″E	
YSTA		Saint Arnaud Airport	St Arnaud, Victoria	36°38′12″S 143°11′12″E	
YSTB		Strathburn Airstrip	Holroyd River, Queensland	14°28′39″S 142°49′29″E	
YSTC		Stuart Creek Aerodrome	Stuarts Creek, South Australia	29°42′46″S 137°03′55″E	
YSTD		Star Landing Area	Dotswood, Queensland	19°20′30″S 146°10′00″E	Military
YSTF		Stratford Heliport	Stratford, Queensland	16°52′17″S 145°44′15″E	
YSTG		Stag Platform Heliport	Offshore Western Australia	20°17′25″S 116°16′31″E	
YSTH	HLS	St Helens Airport	St Helens, Tasmania	41°20′12″S 148°16′54″E	
YSTI		Stephens Island Seaplane Base	Stephens Island, Queensland	09°30′36″S 143°33′00″E	
YSTL		Stirling Station Airstrip	Howitt, Queensland	17°11′31″S 141°42′49″E	
YSTM		Streatham Heliport	Streatham, Victoria	37°40′38″S 143°03′28″E	
YSTN		Stony Head Airstrip	Stony Head, Tasmania	41°02′01″S 146°59′45″E	Military
YSTO		Stonehenge Airstrip	Stonehenge, Shire of Barcoo, Queensland	24°21′23″S 143°17′29″E	
YSTP		Saint Pauls Homestead Airstrip	Seventy Mile, Queensland	20°21′14″S 146°48′04″E	
YSTR		Strathearn Aerodrome	Mooleulooloo, South Australia	31°45′26″S 140°20′33″E	
YSTT		Santa Teresa Airstrip	Santa Teresa, Northern Territory	24°07′00″S 134°23′27″E	
YSTW	TMW	Tamworth Airport	Tamworth, New South Wales	31°05′02″S 150°50′58″E	
YSUD		Sudbury Reef Seaplane Base	Coral Sea Islands	17°02′44″S 146°13′53″E	
YSUJ		Supplejack Downs Airstrip	Tanami, Northern Territory	19°16′08″S 129°56′55″E	
YSUM		Summerhill Road Heliport	Strathalbyn, South Australia	35°16′03″S 138°55′10″E	
YSUN		Sundown Valley Airstrip	Warrabah, New South Wales	30°27′20″S 150°59′14″E	
YSUR		Surveyors Airstrip	Dover / Surveyors Bay, Tasmania	43°17′20″S 147°04′27″E	Closed
YSUT		Suttor Creek Airstrip	Suttor, Queensland	21°20′22″S 147°58′45″E	
YSVE		Channel 7 Sydney Heliport	Epping, New South Wales	33°46′56″S 151°04′07″E	Closed
YSVH		Silver Hills Airstrip	Burleigh, Queensland	20°35′55″S 143°04′41″E	
YSVN		Strathaven Airstrip	Yarraden, Queensland	14°52′27″S 142°57′53″E	
YSVP		Silver Plains Airstrip	Coen, Queensland	13°58′31″S 143°33′13″E	
YSWA		Swansea Airfield	Swansea, Tasmania	42°05′58″S 148°04′13″E	
YSWB		Swan Bay Airstrip	East Coraki, New South Wales	29°02′57″S 153°18′04″E	
YSWD		Seaworld Heliport	Main Beach, Queensland	27°57′34″S 153°25′27″E	
YSWE		Sweers Island Resort Airstrip	Sweers Island, Queensland	17°07′27″S 139°36′13″E	
YSWG	WGA	Wagga Wagga Airport	Wagga Wagga, New South Wales	35°09′55″S 147°27′59″E	
YSWH	SWH	Swan Hill Airport	Swan Hill, Victoria	35°22′44″S 143°32′27″E	
YSWI		Swan Island Airstrip	Swan Island, Tasmania	40°43′46″S 148°07′00″E	
YSWK		South West Rocks Airstrip	Rainbow Reach, Kempsey Shire, New South Wales	30°55′29″S 153°01′39″E	
YSWL	SWC	Stawell Airport	Stawell, Victoria	37°04′18″S 142°44′24″E	
YSWR		Swan Reach Airstrip	Swan Reach, South Australia	34°33′22″S 139°35′32″E	
YSWS	WSI	Western Sydney Airport	Badgerys Creek, New South Wales	33°53′17″S 150°42′53″E	
YSXB		Saxby Downs Airstrip	Saxby, Queensland	20°00′33″S 142°29′05″E	
YSYC		Sandy Cape Heliport	K'gari, Queensland	24°43′07″S 153°13′10″E	Closed
YSYN		Strathalbyn Aerodrome	Langhorne Creek, South Australia	35°19′04″S 139°00′00″E	
YSYY		Sandy Cay Seaplane Base	Coral Sea Islands	16°39′27″S 145°59′23″E	

== YT ==
ICAO	IATA	Airport name	Community	Coordinates	Notes
YTAA	XTR	Tara Airport	Tara, Queensland	27°09′24″S 150°28′36″E	
YTAB	TBL	Tableland Homestead Airport	Tableland, Western Australia	17°17′44″S 126°54′46″E	
YTAD		Tandou Lake Airstrip	Menindee, New South Wales	32°39′57″S 142°04′00″E	
YTAF		Trafalgar Lane Heliport	Evandale, Tasmania	41°33′03″S 147°14′39″E	
YTAH		Tahmoor Mine Heliport	Bargo, New South Wales	34°15′08″S 150°34′36″E	
YTAL		Tralee Airstrip	Tralee, New South Wales	35°23′54″S 149°10′02″E	Closed
YTAM	XTO	Taroom Airport	Taroom, Queensland	25°48′07″S 149°54′48″E	
YTAN		Tanami Downs Airstrip	Tanami, Northern Territory	20°34′25″S 129°44′24″E	
YTAP		Taylors Plains Airstrip	Womblebank, Queensland	25°41′44″S 147°17′42″E	
YTAR	TAQ	Tarcoola Aerodrome	Tarcoola, South Australia	30°42′10″S 134°34′58″E	
YTAV		Avoca Airstrip	Avoca, Tasmania	41°46′54″S 147°43′10″E	Closed
YTBB		Tumby Bay Airport	Tumby Bay, South Australia	34°21′40″S 136°05′42″E	
YTBG		Talbingo Airstrip	Talbingo, New South Wales	35°34′58″S 148°17′32″E	
YTBH		Brendle Downs Station Airstrip	Toobeah, Queensland	28°30′41″S 149°56′34″E	
YTBI		Table Hill Airstrip	West Arnhem, Northern Territory	12°12′19″S 134°00′42″E	
YTBM		Tumbarumba Airstrip	Glenroy, New South Wales	35°45′45″S 147°53′13″E	
YTBP		Tobys Gap Airstrip	K'gari, Queensland	25°35′19″S 153°03′52″E	
YTBR	TBK	Timber Creek Airport	Timber Creek, Northern Territory	15°37′14″S 130°26′53″E	
YTBV		Tibuc Valley Airstrip	Coonabarabran, New South Wales	31°15′24″S 149°07′01″E	
YTBY		Talbot Bay Seaplane Base	Kimbolton, Western Australia	16°20′50″S 123°54′27″E	
YTCF		Tracies Field Airstrip	Telfer, Western Australia	22°18′49″S 122°04′02″E	
YTCK		Torrens Creek Airstrip	Torrens Creek, Queensland	20°46′52″S 145°00′51″E	
YTCL		Tocal Homestead Airstrip	Longreach, Queensland	23°45′22″S 143°29′46″E	
YTCN		TCN Channel Nine Heliport	Willoughby, New South Wales	33°48′41″S 151°11′47″E	Closed
YTCU		Tucson Airstrip	Corfield, Queensland	22°40′53″S 143°20′45″E	
YTCY		Tarcoonyinna Airstrip	Anangu Pitjantjatjara Yankunytjatjara, South Australia	26°45′26″S 133°21′31″E	
YTDL		Tidal River Heliport	Wilsons Promontory, Victoria	39°01′53″S 146°19′43″E	
YTDM		Todmorden Airstrip	Todmorden Station, South Australia	27°07′20″S 134°46′18″E	
YTDN		Tooradin Airfield	Tooradin, Victoria	38°12′53″S 145°25′43″E	
YTDR	TDR	Theodore Airport	Theodore, Queensland	24°59′11″S 150°05′35″E	
YTEA		Terang Airstrip	Togara, Queensland	23°57′39″S 148°46′42″E	Closed
YTEE	TQP	Trepell Airport	McKinlay, Queensland	21°50′06″S 140°53′17″E	
YTEF	TEF	Telfer Airport	Telfer Mine, Telfer, Western Australia	21°42′54″S 122°13′43″E	
YTEK		Sikorsky Helitech Heliport	Pinkenba, Queensland	27°25′59″S 153°06′54″E	
YTEL		Tellaraga Airstrip	Mallowa, New South Wales	29°35′43″S 149°24′26″E	
YTEM	TEM	Temora Airport	Temora, New South Wales	34°25′18″S 147°30′42″E	
YTEP		Tennaperra Airstrip	Cameron Corner, Queensland	28°03′53″S 141°50′34″E	
YTES		Tessa Shoals Sea Heliport	Point Samson, Western Australia	20°33′23″S 117°14′37″E	
YTEX		Texas Airstrip	Texas, Queensland	28°50′05″S 151°09′09″E	
YTFA		Truro Flat Airpark	Annadale, South Australia	34°23′43″S 139°23′00″E	
YTFD		Tenterfield Airstrip	Tenterfield, New South Wales	28°59′28″S 151°55′47″E	
YTFR		Tinaroo Falls Reservoir Seaplane Base	Tinaroo, Queensland	17°10′22″S 145°32′58″E	
YTGA	TAN	Tangalooma Airport	Tangalooma, Queensland	27°08′16″S 153°21′51″E	
YTGG		Taggerty Airstrip	Taggerty, Victoria	37°20′56″S 145°42′07″E	
YTGI		Trangie Airstrip	Trangie, New South Wales	31°58′35″S 148°00′14″E	
YTGM	XTG	Thargomindah Airport	Thargomindah, Queensland	27°59′11″S 143°48′39″E	
YTGT	GTS	The Granites Airport	The Granites, Northern Territory	20°32′54″S 130°21′00″E	
YTGV		The Grove Airstrip	Cootamundra, New South Wales	34°41′10″S 148°06′14″E	
YTGW		Tragowel Airstrip	Muttaburra, Queensland	22°28′11″S 144°27′20″E	
YTHA		Thlyacine "A" Platform Heliport	Offshore Victoria, Australia	39°14′12″S 142°54′06″E	
YTHB		Thredbo Heliport	Thredbo, New South Wales	36°30′20″S 148°18′10″E	
YTHD	TDN	Theda Station Airport	Theda Station, Western Australia	14°47′25″S 126°29′53″E	
YTHI		Thistle Island Airstrip	Thistle Island, South Australia	35°01′29″S 136°10′48″E	Military
YTHM		Three Hummock Island Airstrip	Three Hummock Island, Tasmania	40°27′05″S 144°54′50″E	
YTHN		Thunderbox Airstrip	Leinster, Western Australia	28°09′14″S 120°56′21″E	Formerly YTBX
YTHO		Thomason Seaplane Base	Rakula, Northern Territory	12°56′04″S 130°13′37″E	
YTHR		Three Rivers Homestead Airstrip	Kumarina, Western Australia	25°08′18″S 119°06′18″E	
YTHS		Three Springs Airstrip	Womarden, Western Australia	29°31′40″S 115°51′29″E	
YTHT		The Twins Station Aerodrome	McDouall Peak, South Australia	29°58′58″S 135°24′02″E	Military
YTHV		Thevenard Island Airstrip	Thevenard Island, Western Australia	21°27′34″S 115°00′51″E	
YTHY		Thylungra Airstrip	Eromanga, Queensland	26°05′34″S 143°27′05″E	
YTIB	TYB	Tibooburra Airport	Tibooburra, New South Wales	29°27′06″S 142°03′30″E	
YTIE		Oak Creek Coal Heliport	Tieri, Queensland	23°02′09″S 148°20′57″E	
YTIH		Tickalara Homestead Airstrip	Cameron Corner, Queensland	28°39′57″S 142°12′15″E	
YTII		Trinidad Aerodrome	Eromanga, Queensland	25°35′10″S 143°54′08″E	
YTIN		Tintinara Aerodrome	Tintinara, South Australia	35°52′14″S 140°04′22″E	
YTIT		Ti-Tree Airfield	Ti-Tree, Northern Territory	22°07′38″S 133°25′21″E	
YTIW		Tirrawarra Airstrip	Gidgealpa, South Australia	27°40′10″S 140°05′46″E	
YTIY		Trial Bay Airstrip	East Arnhem, Northern Territory	12°58′39″S 136°30′12″E	
YTJI		Tjirrkarli Airstrip	Tjirrkarli Community, Western Australia	26°00′22″S 125°27′45″E	
YTJU		Tjuntjuntjarra Airstrip	Plumridge Lakes, Western Australia	29°20′42″S 127°06′26″E	
YTKL		Turkey Lane Airstrip	Duncan, South Australia	35°44′15″S 137°07′56″E	
YTKS		Toorak Research Station Airstrip	Kynuna, Queensland	21°02′05″S 141°47′40″E	
YTKY	TKY	Turkey Creek Airport	Warmun (Turkey Creek), Western Australia	17°02′27″S 128°12′22″E	
YTLE		Toorale Airstrip	Gumbalie, New South Wales	30°19′04″S 145°23′54″E	
YTLG		Taralga Grathawa Airstrip	Curraweela, New South Wales	34°17′21″S 149°46′55″E	
YTLH		Toogoolawah Airstrip	Toogoolawah, Queensland	27°04′16″S 152°22′59″E	
YTLI		Talgai Airstrip	Talgai, Queensland	28°03′18″S 151°55′52″E	
YTLL		Tullamore Airstrip	Tullamore, New South Wales	32°36′38″S 147°35′54″E	
YTLP		Tilpa Airstrip	Tilpa, New South Wales	30°55′32″S 144°25′12″E	
YTLT		Tarlton Downs Airstrip	Anatye, Northern Territory	22°38′06″S 136°48′34″E	
YTLW		Talawanta Airstrip	Stokes, Queensland	18°37′39″S 140°15′17″E	
YTLY		The Lily Airstrip	Amelup, Western Australia	34°13′25″S 118°12′57″E	
YTMA		Thalmera Airstrip	Rhydding, Queensland	24°38′59″S 149°37′32″E	
YTMB		Tambo Airstrip	Tambo, Queensland	24°50′20″S 146°17′35″E	
YTME		Tanamera Airstrip	Longreach, Queensland	23°24′54″S 143°49′46″E	
YTML		Tamala Airstrip	Tamala, Western Australia	26°38′43″S 113°44′32″E	
YTMN		Tanami Airstrip	Tanami, Northern Territory	19°57′57″S 129°43′37″E	
YTMO	PHQ	The Monument Airport	Selwyn, Queensland	21°48′42″S 139°55′24″E	
YTMP	TPR	Tom Price Airport	Tom Price, Western Australia	22°44′46″S 117°52′08″E	
YTMS		Tambar Springs Airstrip	Tambar Springs, New South Wales	31°18′50″S 149°50′22″E	
YTMU	TUM	Tumut Airport	Tumut, New South Wales	35°15′46″S 148°14′27″E	
YTMY	TYP	Tobermorey Airport	Tobermorey, Northern Territory	22°15′21″S 137°57′11″E	
YTNB		Tanbar Airstrip	Tanbar, Queensland	25°50′52″S 141°55′41″E	
YTNC		Tuncurry Airstrip	Tuncurry, New South Wales	32°09′00″S 152°28′59″E	Closed
YTND		Townsend Island Seaplane Base	Shoalwater, Queensland	22°18′17″S 150°29′50″E	Military
YTNG	THG	Thangool Airport	Thangool, Queensland	24°29′38″S 150°34′44″E	
YTNK	TCA	Tennant Creek Airport	Tennant Creek, Northern Territory	19°38′04″S 134°11′00″E	
YTNR		Tanumbirini Airstrip	Tanumbirini, Arnold, Northern Territory	16°27′39″S 134°39′07″E	
YTNS		Toliness Airstrip	Bayrick, Queensland	25°19′17″S 146°04′08″E	Road airstrip
YTOA		Toolachie Airstrip	Innamincka, South Australia	28°24′30″S 140°48′36″E	
YTOB		Toomba Airstrip	Basalt, Queensland	19°54′16″S 145°37′16″E	Closed
YTOC	TCW	Tocumwal Airport	Tocumwal, New South Wales	35°48′39″S 145°36′15″E	
YTOG		Togo Station Airstrip	Narrabri, New South Wales	30°04′59″S 149°32′13″E	
YTOI		Torrens Island Heliport	Torrens Island, South Australia	34°48′28″S 138°31′23″E	Closed
YTOK		Torres Park Homestead Airstrip	Upper Warrego, Queensland	25°07′00″S 147°10′01″E	Closed
YTOL		Tooloombilla Homestead Airstrip	Forestvale, Queensland	25°52′26″S 148°02′32″E	
YTOO		Maryland Too Airstrip	Cascade, Western Australia	33°22′12″S 120°52′26″E	
YTOT		Tottenham Aerodrome	Tottenham, New South Wales	32°15′22″S 147°22′08″E	
YTPA		Tipperary Airport	Tipperary Station, Northern Territory	13°43′38″S 131°01′59″E	
YTPD		Thorpdale Airstrip	Thorpdale, Victoria	38°17′34″S 146°11′23″E	
YTPE		Tempe Downs Airstrip	Petermann, Northern Territory	24°22′57″S 132°25′23″E	Closed
YTPK		Turtle Park Airstrip	Marian, Queensland	21°12′30″S 148°58′42″E	
YTPL		Toopuntul Airstrip	Maude, New South Wales	34°20′49″S 144°04′06″E	
YTQY		Torquay Airport	Torquay, Victoria	38°17′45″S 144°21′52″E	
YTRA		Tropicana Airport	Tropicana Gold Mine, Western Australia	29°11′10″S 124°32′51″E	
YTRB		Torrumbarry Airstrip	Torrumbarry, Victoria	36°04′00″S 144°31′59″E	Closed
YTRC		Tarcombe Airstrip	Longreach, Queensland	24°04′20″S 143°23′34″E	
YTRD		Troubridge Island Heliport	Troubridge Island, South Australia	35°07′01″S 137°49′35″E	
YTRE	TRO	Taree Airport	Taree, New South Wales	31°53′19″S 152°30′50″E	
YTRF		Trefoil Island Airstrip	Trefoil Island, Tasmania	40°37′56″S 144°41′12″E	
YTRG		Traeger Airstrip	Mount Eba, South Australia	30°12′34″S 135°13′52″E	Road airstrip
YTRI		Trinity Inlet Seaplane Base	Cairns, Queensland	16°54′58″S 145°46′57″E	
YTRK		Turee Creek Aerodrome	Angelo River, Western Australia	23°37′22″S 118°39′14″E	
YTRN		Tarragona Airstrip	Corfield, Queensland	22°04′58″S 144°00′47″E	
YTRO		Timbaroo Airstrip	Alsace, Queensland	23°16′36″S 149°21′21″E	Closed
YTRP		Plumridge Lakes Airstrip	Plumridge Lakes, Western Australia	29°16′44″S 124°41′00″E	
YTRS		Three Rocks Sea Heliport	Coral Sea Islands	20°56′01″S 149°45′07″E	
YTRU		Tarnuk Airstrip	Merriwa, New South Wales	32°02′48″S 150°25′06″E	
YTRW	TWP	Torwood Airstrip	Ravensworth, Queensland	17°21′48″S 143°45′00″E	
YTSI		Tasman Island Heliport	Tasman Island	43°14′22″S 148°00′14″E	
YTST	TTX	Mungalalu Truscott Airbase	Mungalalu, Western Australia	14°05′23″S 126°22′51″E	
YTTB		Teutonic Bore Aerodrome	Leonora, Western Australia	28°23′26″S 121°11′57″E	
YTTD		OK Village Airstrip	Turtle Head Island, Queensland	10°57′20″S 142°42′14″E	
YTTE		Ti Tree Airstrip	Aurukun, Queensland	13°59′03″S 141°39′19″E	
YTTI		Troughton Island Airport	Troughton Island, Western Australia	13°45′06″S 126°08′54″E	
YTTS		Tartrus Aerodrome	Mount Gardiner, Queensland	22°57′08″S 149°25′41″E	
YTUA		Triabunna Airfield	Triabunna, Tasmania	42°30′49″S 147°53′53″E	
YTUB		Tullaburra Airstrip	Wakool, New South Wales	35°27′29″S 144°16′56″E	
YTUC		Tuckabiana Airstrip	Lake Austin, Western Australia	27°28′22″S 118°08′17″E	
YTUD		Thursday Island Heliport	Thursday Island, Queensland	10°34′59″S 142°12′59″E	Closed
YTUE		Trundle Aerodrome	Trundle, New South Wales	32°56′17″S 147°42′36″E	
YTUG		Trugananni Airstrip	Goomally, Queensland	24°29′36″S 149°12′49″E	
YTUL		Tullah Heliport	Tullah, Tasmania	41°43′59″S 145°37′11″E	Closed
YTUM		Tumbar Station Airstrip	Jericho, Queensland	23°59′04″S 146°16′39″E	
YTUN		Tunbridge Airfield	Tunbridge, Tasmania	42°06′40″S 147°21′45″E	
YTUR		Turee Airstrip	Coolah, New South Wales	31°55′36″S 149°47′43″E	
YTUY		Tully Airstrip	Tully, Queensland	17°56′10″S 145°56′16″E	
YTVA		Talavera Airstrip	Gilberton, Shire of Etheridge, Queensland	19°12′38″S 143°39′49″E	
YTVR		The Vines Heliport	The Vines, Western Australia	31°45′53″S 116°00′27″E	Closed
YTWA		Tierawoomba Airstrip	Oxford, Queensland	21°51′20″S 149°02′05″E	
YTWB	TWB	Toowoomba City Aerodrome	Toowoomba, Queensland	27°32′28″S 151°54′47″E	
YTWD		Talwood Airstrip	Talwood, Queensland	28°29′38″S 149°27′23″E	
YTWE		Trelawney Airstrip	Clermont, Queensland	22°50′16″S 146°41′49″E	
YTWG		Towrang Gliding Aerodrome	Carrick, New South Wales	34°41′27″S 149°53′17″E	
YTWH		The Tweed Hospital Heliport	Tweed Heads, New South Wales	28°10′40″S 153°32′48″E	Closed
YTWL		Two Wells Heliport	Two Wells, South Australia	34°35′17″S 138°30′53″E	Closed
YTWN		Tooraweenah Airstrip	Tooraweenah, New South Wales	31°26′30″S 148°54′00″E	
YTYA		Tyabb Airport	Tyabb, Victoria	38°16′00″S 145°10′46″E	
YTYH		Tyagarah Airstrip	Tyagarah, New South Wales	28°35′41″S 153°33′04″E	
YTYN		Tieyon Aerodrome	Tieyon, South Australia	26°12′54″S 133°54′13″E	

== YU ==
ICAO	IATA	Airport name	Community	Coordinates	Notes
YUAL		Halibut Platform Heliport	Bass Strait, offshore Victoria	38°24′16″S 148°19′13″E	
YUAN		Mulan Airstrip	Sturt Creek, Western Australia	20°06′32″S 127°37′09″E	
YUBK		Umbakumba Airfield	Groote Eylandt, Northern Territory	13°52′23″S 136°47′18″E	
YUBT		Umberatana Homestead Aerodrome	Umberatana, South Australia	30°14′03″S 139°06′20″E	
YUBX		Cobia Platform Heliport	Bass Strait, offshore Victoria	38°26′59″S 148°18′33″E	
YUCH		Ucharonidge Airstrip	Pamayu, Northern Territory	17°40′21″S 134°14′27″E	
YUDA	UDA	Undara Airport	Undara Volcanic National Park, Queensland	18°11′30″S 144°36′48″E	
YUDG		Urandangi Airstrip	Piturie, Queensland	21°35′40″S 138°21′56″E	
YUDL		Undilla Airstrip	Camooweal, Queensland	19°37′30″S 138°37′59″E	
YUFA		Kingfish "A" Platform Heliport	Bass Strait, offshore Victoria	38°35′48″S 148°08′41″E	
YUFB		Kingfish "B" Platform Heliport	Bass Strait, offshore Victoria	38°35′50″S 148°11′17″E	
YUFW		West Kingfish Platform Heliport	Bass Strait, offshore Victoria	38°35′36″S 148°06′20″E	
YUKL		Mackerel Sea Heliport	Bass Strait, offshore Victoria	38°28′46″S 148°20′34″E	
YULC		Ulcanbah Airstrip	Pentland, Queensland	22°01′46″S 145°58′27″E	
YULN		Ulan Coal Mines Heliport	Ulan, New South Wales	32°14′21″S 149°44′44″E	
YULX		Flounder Platform Heliport	Bass Strait, offshore Victoria	38°18′41″S 148°26′22″E	
YUMA		Bream "A" Platform Heliport	Bass Strait, offshore Victoria	38°30′00″S 147°46′20″E	
YUMB		Umbeara Airstrip	Ghan, Northern Territory	25°44′48″S 133°42′07″E	
YUMU		Umuwa Airstrip	Umuwa, South Australia	26°29′12″S 132°02′24″E	
YUNA		Tuna Platform Heliport	Bass Strait, offshore Victoria	38°10′12″S 148°25′10″E	
YUND		Mundiwa Airstrip	Collerina, New South Wales	29°35′49″S 146°36′38″E	
YUNG		Borung Airstrip	Mysia, Victoria	36°15′56″S 143°47′07″E	
YUNW		West Tuna Platform Heliport	Bass Strait, offshore Victoria	38°11′33″S 148°23′19″E	
YUNY	CZY	Cluny Airport	Cluny, Queensland	24°30′41″S 139°37′02″E	
YUOF		Longford Heliport	Longford, Victoria	38°13′12″S 147°10′06″E	
YUPA		Dolphin Platform Heliport	Bass Strait, offshore Victoria	38°29′14″S 147°22′39″E	
YUPC		Upolu Cay Seaplane Base	Coral Sea Islands	16°41′00″S 145°56′20″E	
YUPE		Perch Platform Heliport	Bass Strait, offshore Victoria	38°34′09″S 147°19′21″E	
YUPG		Urapunga Airstrip	Wilton, Northern Territory	14°42′19″S 134°33′45″E	
YUPH		Upper Horton Wyl Airstrip	Upper Horton, New South Wales	30°06′23″S 150°24′15″E	
YUPX		Marlin Platform Heliport	Bass Strait, offshore Victoria	38°13′50″S 148°13′15″E	
YURB		Bream "B" Platform Heliport	Bass Strait, offshore Victoria	38°31′02″S 147°50′20″E	
YURL		Urlampe Airstrip	Anatye, Northern Territory	22°27′26″S 137°43′16″E	
YURR		Burra Heliport	Burra, South Australia	33°40′35″S 138°56′29″E	
YUSL	USL	Useless Loop Airport	Useless Loop, Western Australia	26°09′29″S 113°23′41″E	
YUSN		Snapper Platform Heliport	Bass Strait, offshore Victoria	38°11′39″S 148°01′32″E	
YUSU		Fortesque Platform Heliport	Bass Strait, offshore Victoria	38°24′27″S 148°16′41″E	
YUTA		Barracouta Platform Heliport	Bass Strait, offshore Victoria	38°17′48″S 147°40′34″E	
YUTP		Utopia Airstrip	Sandover, Northern Territory	22°03′18″S 134°47′24″E	
YUTS		Utopia Station Airstrip	Ankerrapw, Northern Territory	22°13′55″S 134°34′44″E	
YUWH		Whiting Platform Heliport	Bass Strait, offshore Victoria	38°14′24″S 147°52′26″E	

== YV ==
ICAO	IATA	Airport name	Community	Coordinates	Notes
YVAF		Valley Farm Airstrip	Truro, South Australia	34°23′14″S 139°08′39″E	Closed
YVAL		The Vale Airstrip	Claude Road, Tasmania	41°25′48″S 146°15′48″E	
YVAN		Vansittart Bay Seaplane Base	Mitchell Plateau, Western Australia	14°00′00″S 126°08′00″E	
YVCB		Victoria Barracks Heliport	Paddington, New South Wales	33°53′04″S 151°13′37″E	Closed
YVFL		Waverley Park Heliport	Mulgrave, Victoria	37°55′31″S 145°11′18″E	
YVIE		Victor Island East Sea Heliport	Coral Sea Islands	21°15′17″S 149°25′12″E	
YVIL		The Ville Heliport	Townsville, Queensland	19°15′00″S 146°49′34″E	
YVIV		Mount Vivian Aerodrome	Mount Vivian, South Australia	30°34′51″S 135°43′47″E	Military
YVIW		Victor Island West Sea Heliport	Coral Sea Islands	21°17′46″S 149°21′34″E	
YVLG		Valley of Lagoons Airstrip	Valley of Lagoons, Queensland	18°40′27″S 145°05′40″E	
YVLY		Varley Aerodrome	Holt Rock, Western Australia	32°43′11″S 119°30′21″E	
YVND		Booby Island Seaplane Base	Booby Island, Queensland	10°36′18″S 141°54′30″E	
YVNI		Vanderlin Island Heliport	Vanderlin Island, Northern Territory	15°41′57″S 136°58′58″E	
YVNS		Vaughan Springs Aerodrome	Lake Mackay, Northern Territory	22°20′31″S 130°51′53″E	
YVOB		Vivonne Bay Heliport	Vivonne Bay, South Australia, South Australia	35°58′57″S 137°10′57″E	
YVPC		Victoria Police Centre Heliport	Docklands, Victoria	37°48′52″S 144°57′04″E	
YVPK		Victoria Park Heliport	Ewingsdale, New South Wales	28°39′12″S 153°34′30″E	
YVRD	VCD	Victoria River Downs Airport	Victoria River Downs Station, Northern Territory	16°24′12″S 131°00′12″E	
YVRS	VNR	Vanrook Station Airstrip	Yagoonya, Queensland	16°57′44″S 141°57′09″E	
YVSH		Vashon Head Airstrip	Cobourg, Northern Territory	11°08′35″S 131°58′55″E	
YVTH		Victor Harbor Heliport	Victor Harbor, South Australia	35°33′42″S 138°36′24″E	
YVVA		Victoria Valley Airbase	Glenisla, Victoria	37°11′01″S 142°20′22″E	
YVVL		Violet Vale Airstrip	Yarraden, Queensland	14°44′01″S 143°35′22″E	

== YW ==
ICAO	IATA	Airport name	Community	Coordinates	Notes
YWAA		Wandoo Alpha Heliport	Offshore Western Australia	20°08′12″S 116°25′10″E	
YWAB		Waldburg Homestead Aerodrome	East Lyons River, Western Australia	24°43′00″S 117°20′43″E	
YWAC		Wauchope Airstrip	Davenport, Northern Territory	20°38′26″S 134°12′55″E	
YWAG		Wanaaring Airstrip	Wanaaring, New South Wales	29°42′42″S 144°10′16″E	
YWAH		Wahroongah Airstrip	Isisford, Queensland	24°27′00″S 144°06′38″E	
YWAL	WLA	Wallal Downs Airport	Wallal Downs, Western Australia	19°46′27″S 120°38′59″E	
YWAN		Wanda Beach Heliport	Kurnell, New South Wales	34°02′23″S 151°09′49″E	
YWAO		Wandoo Bravo Heliport	Offshore Western Australia	20°07′26″S 116°26′02″E	
YWAR		Warragul Heliport	Warragul, Victoria	38°10′06″S 145°56′03″E	
YWAT		Wattle Hills Airstrip	Shelburne, Queensland	12°38′14″S 143°02′29″E	
YWAV	WAV	Wave Hill Airport	Gurindji, Northern Territory	17°23′37″S 131°07′09″E	
YWAX		Wanarn Airstrip	Wanarn Community, Western Australia	25°17′51″S 127°33′23″E	
YWBA		Woorabinda Airstrip	Woorabinda, Queensland	24°06′51″S 149°28′35″E	
YWBB		Womblebank Homestead Airfield	Womblebank, Queensland	25°45′19″S 148°06′07″E	
YWBE		Werribee Airfield	Wyndham Vale, Victoria	37°51′21″S 144°37′03″E	
YWBH		Wallabadah Airstrip	Wallabadah, New South Wales	31°34′36″S 150°56′03″E	
YWBI		Warrabri Airstrip	Ali Curung, Northern Territory	20°59′57″S 134°23′47″E	
YWBL	WMB	Warrnambool Airport	Warrnambool, Victoria	38°17′43″S 142°26′48″E	
YWBN		Wedderburn Airport	Wedderburn, New South Wales	34°10′48″S 150°48′30″E	
YWBR		Warburton Airport	Warburton, Western Australia	26°07′42″S 126°35′00″E	
YWBS	SYU	Warraber Island Airport	Warraber Island, Queensland	10°12′24″S 142°49′24″E	
YWBV		West Beverley	Dale, Western Australia	32°08′15″S 116°43′58″E	
YWBY		Westbury Airstrip	Longreach, Queensland	22°55′46″S 144°25′02″E	
YWCA	WIO	Wilcannia Airport	Wilcannia, New South Wales	31°31′10″S 143°22′50″E	
YWCH	WLC	Walcha Airport	Walcha, New South Wales	31°00′24″S 151°33′11″E	
YWCK	WAZ	Warwick Airport	Warwick, Queensland	28°08′58″S 151°56′35″E	
YWCM		Wilson's Camp Airstrip	Tanami, Northern Territory	20°05′54″S 129°07′36″E	
YWCN		Warbreccan Aerodrome	Stonehenge, Barcoo Shire, Queensland	24°17′54″S 142°50′51″E	
YWCS		Winchelsea Heliport	Winchelsea, Victoria	38°14′43″S 143°59′19″E	Closed
YWDA		Windarra Airstrip	Laverton, Western Australia	28°28′50″S 122°14′40″E	
YWDC		Wodgina Airstrip	Marble Bar, Western Australia	21°08′19″S 118°41′34″E	Closed
YWDE		Wingadee Airstrip	Winmalee, New South Wales	30°34′57″S 148°19′07″E	
YWDG		Windarling Airport	Windarling Mine, Western Australia	30°01′54″S 119°23′24″E	
YWDH	WNR	Windorah Airport	Windorah, Queensland	25°24′48″S 142°40′00″E	
YWDI		Wardang Island Airstrip	Wardang Island, South Australia	34°28′32″S 137°21′45″E	
YWDJ		Windjana Grove Airstrip	Wunaamin Miliwundi Ranges, Western Australia	17°25′17″S 124°55′30″E	
YWDL		Wondoola Airstrip	Stokes, Queensland	18°34′24″S 140°53′42″E	
YWDM		Waddamana Heliport	Waddamana, Tasmania	42°07′42″S 146°43′38″E	Closed
YWDS		Woodside Airstrip	Woodside, South Australia	34°57′31″S 138°53′26″E	
YWDT		Wyandotte Airstrip	Greenvale, Queensland	18°45′14″S 144°50′27″E	
YWDU		Wandu Airstrip	Temora, New South Wales	34°23′51″S 147°25′49″E	
YWDV		Wandovale (Mount Full Stop) Airstrip	Basalt, Queensland	19°40′12″S 144°53′07″E	
YWDY		Wide Bay Aerodrome	Tin Can Bay, Queensland	25°56′10″S 152°57′54″E	Closed
YWEA		Wanella Station Airstrip	Coppabella, Queensland	21°53′45″S 148°22′19″E	
YWEB		Werribee Airstrip	Woodstock, New South Wales	33°42′50″S 148°53′27″E	Closed
YWEC		Wellclose Airstrip	Adavale, Queensland	25°51′06″S 145°05′39″E	
YWED		Wedderburn Airstrip	Nine Mile, Victoria	36°25′50″S 143°29′15″E	Closed
YWEE		Wooleen Homestead Airstrip	Murchison, Western Australia	27°05′44″S 116°09′07″E	
YWEH		Weipa Heliport	Nanum, Queensland	12°38′19″S 141°51′37″E	
YWEL	QEL	Bodangora Airport	Wellington, New South Wales	32°27′39″S 148°59′27″E	
YWEO		Wertaloona Aerodrome	Wertaloona, South Australia	30°38′42″S 139°20′32″E	
YWER		Wernadinga Airstrip	Carpentaria, Queensland	18°07′27″S 139°57′22″E	
YWEX		Well 33 Airstrip	Gibson Desert North, Western Australia	22°23′10″S 124°49′09″E	
YWFD		Western Field Airstrip	St George Ranges, Western Australia	19°19′07″S 125°34′49″E	Closed
YWGA		Port Hedland/Wodgina Airport	Marble Bar, Western Australia	21°02′09″S 118°38′37″E	
YWGE		Wandagee Station Airstrip	Minilya, Western Australia	23°46′01″S 114°33′05″E	
YWGI		Wedge Island Airstrip	Wedge Island, South Australia	35°09′01″S 136°27′40″E	
YWGM		White Gum Airstrip	Malebelling, Western Australia	31°52′02″S 116°56′21″E	
YWGN		Wagin Airport	Wagin, Western Australia	33°18′59″S 117°21′37″E	
YWGT	WGT	Wangaratta Airport	Wangaratta, Victoria	36°24′57″S 146°18′25″E	
YWGW		Wongawol Aerodrome	Lake Carnegie, Western Australia	26°07′06″S 121°57′35″E	
YWHA	WYA	Whyalla Airport	Whyalla, South Australia	33°03′32″S 137°30′52″E	
YWHC		White Cliffs Aerodrome	White Cliffs, New South Wales	30°51′05″S 143°04′24″E	
YWHG		Wahring Field Aerodrome	Wahring, Victoria	36°40′51″S 145°14′33″E	
YWHI		Witchelina Aerodrome	Witchelina, South Australia	30°02′23″S 138°03′32″E	
YWHL		Walhallow Airstrip	Creswell, Northern Territory	17°46′42″S 135°39′30″E	
YWHN		Whitehaven Seaplane Base	Whitsunday Islands, Queensland	20°16′38″S 149°02′14″E	
YWHP		Wollongong Heliport	Wollongong, New South Wales	34°26′22″S 150°53′45″E	
YWHY		Brisbane Water Police Heliport	Port of Brisbane, Queensland	27°24′04″S 153°09′51″E	
YWIB		Mount Willoughby Aerodrome	Mount Willoughby, South Australia	27°57′29″S 134°08′58″E	
YWID		Widden Airstrip	Widden, New South Wales	32°31′15″S 150°20′44″E	
YWIE		Wirralie Gold Mine Airstrip	Mount Coolon, Queensland	21°07′36″S 147°16′22″E	
YWIG		Wigram Island (Mallarrami) Airstrip	Wigram Island, Northern Territory	11°46′51″S 136°32′22″E	
YWII		Wirrina Heliport	Wirrina Cove, South Australia	35°30′30″S 138°14′24″E	
YWIL		Wilandra Airstrip	Mutawintji, New South Wales	31°17′13″S 142°39′04″E	
YWIM		Wieambilla/Kenya Heliport	Crossroads, Queensland	26°56′26″S 150°27′33″E	
YWIN		Willowbank Skydiving Airstrip	Mount Forbes, Queensland	27°43′16″S 152°38′39″E	
YWIO		Wilton Aerodrome	Wilton, New South Wales	34°13′12″S 150°40′15″E	
YWIR		Wirraminna Aerodrome	Wirraminna, South Australia	31°11′34″S 136°13′12″E	
YWIS		Williamson Airfield	Rockhampton, Queensland	22°28′24″S 150°10′42″E	
YWIT	WIT	Wittenoom Airport	Wittenoom, Western Australia	22°13′33″S 118°21′16″E	Military
YWJL		Wujal Wujal Heliport	Wujal Wujal, Queensland	15°56′54″S 145°19′07″E	
YWJS		Wee Jasper Airstrip	Wee Jasper, New South Wales	35°07′49″S 148°41′24″E	
YWKB	WKB	Warracknabeal Airport	Warracknabeal, Victoria	36°19′16″S 142°25′10″E	
YWKD		Woodycupaldiya Airstrip	Nemarluk, Northern Territory	13°51′59″S 129°59′17″E	
YWKI		Waikerie Airport	Waikerie, South Australia	34°11′00″S 140°01′48″E	
YWKM		Wyalkatchem Aerodrome	Wyalkatchem, Western Australia	31°12′09″S 117°22′44″E	
YWKR		Walker Island Airstrip	Walker Island (North), Tasmania	40°37′04″S 144°56′10″E	
YWKU		Wurankuwu Airstrip	Bathurst Island, Tiwi Islands, Northern Territory	11°37′12″S 130°17′49″E	
YWKW		Warkworth Airstrip	Warkworth, New South Wales	32°32′54″S 151°01′27″E	
YWLA		Willowra Airstrip	Willowra, Northern Territory	21°16′43″S 132°37′43″E	
YWLB		Welbourn Hill Airstrip	Welbourne Hill Station, South Australia	27°20′32″S 134°05′12″E	
YWLD		Willis Island Seaplane Base	Willis Island, Coral Sea Islands	16°17′13″S 149°58′17″E	
YWLF		Welford Aerodrome	Jundah, Queensland	25°10′05″S 143°19′51″E	
YWLG	WGE	Walgett Airport	Walgett, New South Wales	30°02′00″S 148°07′30″E	
YWLH		Wallara Ranch Airstrip	Petermann, Northern Territory	24°38′52″S 132°19′28″E	
YWLI		Mount Wellington Heliport	Wellington Park, Tasmania	42°53′47″S 147°14′09″E	Closed
YWLM	NTL	Newcastle Airport / RAAF Williamtown	Newcastle, New South Wales	32°47′42″S 151°50′04″E	Joint use
YWLN		Wooltana Airstrip	Wooltana Station, South Australia	30°25′17″S 139°26′35″E	
YWLO		Willeroo Airstrip	Delamere, Northern Territory	15°17′32″S 131°34′46″E	
YWLP		Wilsons Promontory (Yanakie) Aerodrome	Wilsons Promontory, Victoria	38°57′00″S 146°17′02″E	
YWLU	WUN	Wiluna Airport	Wiluna, Western Australia	26°37′48″S 120°13′12″E	
YWLX		Wallacia Airstrip	Wallacia, New South Wales	33°52′00″S 150°39′00″E	Closed
YWMA		Wonnaminta Stat Aerodrome	Packsaddle, New South Wales	30°39′04″S 142°20′31″E	
YWMC		William Creek Airport	William Creek, South Australia	28°54′24″S 136°20′30″E	
YWMG		Weilmoringle Airstrip	Weilmoringle, New South Wales	29°14′08″S 146°55′20″E	
YWML		Westmoreland Airstrip	Nicholson, Queensland	17°19′16″S 138°14′17″E	
YWMM		Wollomombi Airstrip	Wollomombi, New South Wales	30°29′28″S 152°05′02″E	
YWMO		West Musgrave Airstrip	Ngaanyatjarra-giles, Western Australia	26°03′11″S 127°41′27″E	
YWMP	WPK	Wrotham Park Airport	Wrotham Park, Queensland	16°39′29″S 144°00′03″E	
YWMR		Wrotham Park Resort Airstrip	Wrotham, Queensland	16°29′36″S 143°43′52″E	
YWMY		Williambury Aerodrome	Minilya, Western Australia	23°51′25″S 115°08′33″E	
YWNA		Wilgena Aerodrome	Wilgena Station, South Australia	30°46′00″S 134°43′48″E	
YWND	WDI	Wondai Airport	Wondai, Queensland	26°17′03″S 151°51′41″E	
YWNG		Wonga Airstrip	Broken Hill, New South Wales	32°27′22″S 141°15′26″E	
YWNI		Wathanin Airstrip	Aurukun, Queensland	13°42′15″S 141°33′15″E	
YWNL		Wingellina Airstip	Wingellina, Western Australia	26°03′38″S 128°55′42″E	
YWNN		Wandoan Airstrip	Wandoan, Queensland	26°06′46″S 149°57′24″E	
YWNO		Wonganoo Aerodrome	Wiluna, Western Australia	27°08′18″S 121°20′19″E	
YWNR		Woolner Aerodrome	Hotham, Northern Territory	12°21′47″S 131°27′59″E	
YWNS		Wandsworth Airstrip	Jundah, Queensland	25°01′51″S 143°40′30″E	
YWNT		Westmead NETS Base Hospital Heliport	Westmead, New South Wales	33°48′09″S 150°59′24″E	
YWOD		Woodbury Airfield	Woodbury, Tasmania	42°09′45″S 147°27′00″E	
YWOG		Wonthaggi Township Heliport	Wonthaggi, Victoria	38°36′02″S 145°35′53″E	
YWOK		Woodstock Airstrip	Hopetoun, Western Australia	33°46′16″S 120°15′09″E	
YWOH		Wongan Hills Airport	Wongan Hills, Western Australia	30°52′48″S 116°43′38″E	
YWOM		Woolomin Airstrip	Woolomin, New South Wales	31°19′00″S 151°07′59″E	Closed
YWON		Wongalara Airstrip	Flying Fox, Northern Territory	14°06′01″S 134°24′49″E	
YWOO		Woodvale Airstrip	Merah North, New South Wales	30°14′27″S 149°08′36″E	
YWOR	WLL	Wollogorang Airport	Wollogorang Station, Northern Territory	17°13′12″S 137°56′04″E	
YWOT		Wooloomanata Aerodrome	Little River, Victoria	37°56′12″S 144°22′13″E	
YWOU		Wombungi Airstrip	Bradshaw, Northern Territory	14°46′31″S 131°02′50″E	
YWOV		Woodvale Airfield	Woodvale, Victoria	36°38′00″S 144°11′00″E	
YWOW		Wings Out West Airstrip	Dubbo, New South Wales	32°20′17″S 148°31′42″E	
YWOX		Woorlba Aerodrome	Balladonia, Western Australia	32°23′38″S 123°59′19″E	
YWPA		Wirrealpa Aerodrome	Wirrealpa, South Australia	31°08′25″S 138°58′48″E	
YWPD		Wilpena Pound Airstrip	Flinders Ranges, South Australia	31°31′01″S 138°37′29″E	
YWPE		Walpole Airport	North Walpole, Western Australia	34°57′13″S 116°41′43″E	
YWPL		Winning Pool North Airstrip	Lyndon, Western Australia	23°07′01″S 114°31′34″E	
YWPN		Wilpena Airstrip	Flinders Ranges, South Australia	31°31′00″S 138°37′30″E	
YWPR		Wilpoorinna Airstrip	Mundowdna, South Australia	29°57′48″S 138°20′14″E	
YWRA		Wooroona Airstrip	Barkly, Queensland	20°28′47″S 138°10′05″E	
YWRC		Hyden (Wave Rock) Airstrip	Hyden, Western Australia	32°25′36″S 118°54′29″E	Formerly YHYD
YWRE		Wirralie Airstrip	Aramac, Queensland	22°17′56″S 145°59′01″E	
YWRK		Warooka Airstrip	Point Souttar, South Australia	34°57′27″S 137°18′44″E	
YWRL		Warialda Airstrip	Warialda, New South Wales	29°32′10″S 150°32′12″E	
YWRN	QRR	Warren Airport	Warren, New South Wales	31°44′00″S 147°48′12″E	
YWRO		Wallaroo Heliport	Wallaroo, South Australia	33°55′38″S 137°38′16″E	
YWRR		Warroora Homestead Aerodrome	Lyndon, Western Australia	23°26′46″S 113°50′55″E	
YWRS		Werrington Airstrip	Lyndhurst, Queensland	19°19′09″S 144°04′49″E	
YWRT		Waratah Airfield	Waratah, Tasmania	41°26′56″S 145°32′53″E	
YWRV		Walker River Airstrip	Numburindi, Northern Territory	13°35′57″S 135°45′36″E	
YWSB		West Beach Heliport	West Beach, South Australia	34°56′58″S 138°30′08″E	
YWSC		Western Creek Airstrip	Sturt Plateau, Northern Territory	15°39′42″S 132°40′21″E	
YWSD		Westwood Downs Aerodrome	Broughams Gate, New South Wales	30°42′41″S 141°23′52″E	
YWSG		Watts Bridge Memorial Airfield	Cressbrook, Queensland	27°05′44″S 152°27′35″E	
YWSI		Wirrida Siding Airstrip	Ingomar, South Australia	29°34′36″S 134°32′07″E	Military
YWSL		West Sale Airport	Sale, Victoria	38°05′30″S 146°57′55″E	
YWSN		Woodstock Airstrip	Victoria Vale, Queensland	19°21′31″S 142°45′25″E	
YWSR		Wallsair Airstrip	Maryland, New South Wales	32°52′58″S 151°40′20″E	
YWST		Westmead Hospital Heliport	Westmead, New South Wales	33°48′17″S 150°59′18″E	
YWSX		Westonia Aerodrome	Westonia, Western Australia	31°19′08″S 118°41′05″E	
YWTA		Wintinna Aerodrome	Wintinna, South Australia	27°43′45″S 134°07′25″E	
YWTB		Watsons Bay Heliport	HMAS Watson, New South Wales	33°50′06″S 151°16′50″E	Closed
YWTE		White Tip Reef Seaplane Base	Coral Sea Islands	19°55′00″S 150°14′00″E	
YWTH		Waterhouse Island Airstrip	Waterhouse Island, Tasmania	40°48′36″S 147°37′30″E	
YWTI		Walcott Inlet Seaplane Base	Wunaamin Miliwundi Ranges, Western Australia	16°22′59″S 124°29′01″E	
YWTL	WLO	Waterloo Airport	Waterloo, Northern Territory	16°37′48″S 129°19′16″E	
YWTN	WIN	Winton Airport	Winton, Queensland	22°21′48″S 143°05′06″E	
YWTO		Wentworth Airport	Wentworth, New South Wales	34°05′18″S 141°53′30″E	
YWTP		Wheatstone Platform Heliport	Offshore Western Australia	19°55′48″S 115°23′03″E	
YWTV		Watson River Airstrip	Archer River, Queensland	13°13′43″S 142°14′08″E	
YWUD	WUD	Wudinna Airport	Wudinna, South Australia	33°02′36″S 135°26′48″E	
YWUL		Wulwuwuy Airstrip	East Arnhem, Northern Territory	12°53′28″S 136°21′26″E	
YWVA	WVA	Warnervale Airport	Warnervale, New South Wales	33°14′27″S 151°25′40″E	
YWVL		Warren Vale Station Airstrip	Stokes, Queensland	18°25′09″S 140°47′14″E	
YWVN		Wolverton Airstrip	Archer River, Queensland	13°18′51″S 142°53′08″E	
YWVR		Wolgan Valley Heliport	Wolgan Valley, New South Wales	33°15′13″S 150°11′16″E	
YWWA		Wee Waa Airstrip	Wee Waa, New South Wales	30°15′30″S 149°24′29″E	
YWWD		Weewondilla Aerodrome	Longreach, Queensland	22°45′05″S 144°24′06″E	
YWWE		Warrawee Airstrip	Seventy Mile, Queensland	20°17′47″S 146°37′04″E	
YWWG		Warrawagine Aerodrome	Marble Bar, Western Australia	20°50′39″S 120°42′07″E	
YWWH		Wentford Homestead Airstrip	Moranbah, Queensland	22°03′50″S 147°43′16″E	
YWWI	WWI	Woodie Woodie Airport	Pilbara, Western Australia	21°38′42″S 121°11′30″E	
YWWL	WWY	West Wyalong Airport	West Wyalong, New South Wales	33°56′12″S 147°11′30″E	
YWWS		Wirraway Station Aerodrome	Tabragalba, Queensland	28°00′53″S 153°04′11″E	
YWWX		Williwin Aerodrome	Barcaldine, Queensland	24°07′27″S 145°35′05″E	
YWYA		Wyandra Airstrip	Wyandra, Queensland	27°16′00″S 145°59′24″E	
YWYB		Wynbring Airstrip	Yellabinna, South Australia	30°33′30″S 133°32′02″E	
YWYF		Wycheproof Airport	Wycheproof, Victoria	36°03′30″S 143°14′24″E	
YWYG		Wyagipo Airstrip	Wilton, Northern Territory	14°36′59″S 135°29′27″E	
YWYL		Whyalla Airstrip	Smithlea, Queensland	28°45′38″S 151°02′15″E	
YWYM	WYN	Wyndham Airport	Wyndham, Western Australia	15°30′41″S 128°09′11″E	
YWYN		Wynella Airstrip	Dirranbandi, Queensland	28°56′17″S 148°07′44″E	
YWYO		Wyoming Heliport	Bowenville, Queensland	27°13′09″S 151°29′41″E	Military
YWYR		Wyreema Airstrip	Wyreema, Queensland	27°40′03″S 151°51′16″E	
YWYT		Wayatinah Heliport	Wayatinah, Tasmania	42°23′18″S 146°30′07″E	
YWYU		Wyuna Airstrip	Highbury, Western Australia	33°05′43″S 117°01′57″E	
YWYY	BWT	Burnie Airport	Wynyard, Tasmania	40°59′56″S 145°43′52″E	

== YX ==
These ICAO codes are reserved for heliports and are often associated with hospitals (e.g. Canberra Hospital, YXCB).

ICAO	IATA	Airport name	Community	Coordinates	Notes
YXAA		New Royal Adelaide Hospital Heliport	Adelaide, South Australia	34°55′15″S 138°35′10″E	
YXAB		Coonabarabran Hospital Heliport	Coonabarabran, New South Wales	31°16′31″S 149°17′04″E	
YXAE		Katherine Hospital Heliport	Katherine, Northern Territory	14°26′24″S 132°16′15″E	
YXAG		Angaston Hospital Heliport	Angaston, South Australia	34°30′26″S 139°02′36″E	
YXAH		Lambert Park Heliport	Armidale, New South Wales	30°30′40″S 151°39′20″E	
YXAL		Albury Hospital Heliport	East Albury, New South Wales	36°04′45″S 146°56′19″E	Closed
YXAN		Ardrossan Hospital Heliport	Ardrossan, South Australia	34°25′37″S 137°55′02″E	
YXAO		Canowindra Hospital Heliport	Canowindra, New South Wales	33°33′24″S 148°40′31″E	
YXAR		Ararat Hospital Heliport	Ararat, Victoria	37°16′43″S 142°55′53″E	
YXAT		Atherton Hospital Heliport	Atherton, Queensland	17°15′57″S 145°29′01″E	
YXAU		Wyatt Park Heliport	Lidcombe, New South Wales	33°51′30″S 151°02′27″E	
YXBA		Balaklava Hospital Heliport	Balaklava, South Australia	34°08′21″S 138°25′10″E	
YXBD		Bundaberg Base Hospital Heliport	Bundaberg West, Queensland	24°52′10″S 152°20′06″E	
YXBF		Bicheno Medical Heliport	Bicheno, Tasmania	41°52′17″S 148°18′20″E	
YXBH		Bathurst Hospital Heliport	West Bathurst, New South Wales	33°24′21″S 149°34′19″E	
YXBI		Biggenden Hospital Heliport	Biggenden, Queensland	25°30′25″S 152°03′02″E	
YXBK		Bellbrook Medical Helipad	Bellbrook, New South Wales	30°49′00″S 152°30′59″E	
YXBL		Blacktown Hospital Heliport	Blacktown, New South Wales	33°46′36″S 150°55′01″E	Closed
YXBM		Blue Mountains Hospital Heliport	Katoomba, New South Wales	33°42′19″S 150°19′20″E	
YXBN		Bairnsdale Hospital Heliport	Bairnsdale, Victoria	37°49′53″S 147°36′33″E	
YXBO		Boonah Hospital Heliport	Boonah, Queensland	27°59′57″S 152°40′45″E	
YXBR		Mount Barker Hospital Heliport	Mount Barker, South Australia	35°04′53″S 138°52′10″E	Closed
YXBS		Beaudesert Hospital Heliport	Beaudesert, Queensland	27°59′08″S 153°00′08″E	
YXBT		Ballarat Health Service Heliport	Ballarat, Victoria	37°33′33″S 143°50′44″E	
YXBU		Bulwer/Moreton Island Heliport	Moreton Island, Queensland	27°04′21″S 153°22′03″E	
YXBV		Bega Hospital Heliport	Bega, New South Wales	36°41′16″S 149°51′31″E	
YXBW		Bowen Hospital Heliport	Bowen, Queensland	20°00′24″S 148°14′24″E	
YXBY		Alonnah Medical Heliport	Alonnah, Tasmania	43°19′00″S 147°14′42″E	
YXBZ		Biloela Hospital Heliport	Biloela, Queensland	24°23′37″S 150°30′55″E	
YXCA		Moriarty Park Heliport	Canungra, Queensland	28°01′07″S 153°09′35″E	
YXCB		Canberra Hospital Heliport	Canberra, Australian Capital Territory	35°20′44″S 149°06′10″E	
YXCC		Concord Hospital Heliport	Concord West, New South Wales	33°50′20″S 151°05′40″E	
YXCE		Cairns South Health Facility Heliport	Edmonton, Queensland	17°01′07″S 145°43′31″E	
YXCF		Orange Helicopter Rescue Base	Orange, New South Wales	33°18′13″S 149°07′16″E	
YXCH		Cherbourg Hospital Heliport	Cherbourg, Queensland	26°17′28″S 151°57′27″E	
YXCI		Chinchilla Hospital Heliport	Chinchilla, Queensland	26°44′26″S 150°38′03″E	
YXCK		Cessnock Hospital Heliport	Cessnock, New South Wales	32°49′37″S 151°20′53″E	
YXCL		Collarenebri Hospital Heliport	Collarenebri, New South Wales	29°32′42″S 148°34′53″E	Closed
YXCM		Cooma Hospital Heliport	Cooma, New South Wales	36°14′32″S 149°07′48″E	
YXCO		Cooktown Health Service Heliport	Cooktown, Queensland	15°28′40″S 145°15′01″E	
YXCP		Campbelltown Hospital Heliport	Campbelltown, New South Wales	34°04′42″S 150°48′20″E	
YXCS		Cloncurry Hospital Heliport	Cloncurry, Queensland	20°42′13″S 140°31′43″E	
YXCT		Clermont Hospital Heliport	Clermont, Queensland	22°49′37″S 147°37′52″E	
YXCU		Cunninghams Gap Heliport	Tarome, Queensland	28°02′52″S 152°26′45″E	
YXCV		Collinsville Hospital Heliport	Collinsville, Queensland	20°32′48″S 147°50′16″E	
YXCW		Cowra Hospital Heliport	Cowra, New South Wales	33°49′52″S 148°41′32″E	Closed
YXCY		Calvary Hospital Heliport	Canberra, Australian Capital Territory	35°19′11″S 149°05′48″E	Closed
YXDA		Dalby Hospital Heliport	Dalby, Queensland	27°10′02″S 151°16′37″E	
YXDB		Dubbo Hospital Heliport	Dubbo, New South Wales	32°14′19″S 148°37′14″E	
YXDD		Dandenong Heliport	Dandenong, Victoria	37°58′35″S 145°13′15″E	
YXDE		Denman Medical Heliport	Denman, New South Wales	32°23′12″S 150°40′55″E	
YXDG		Dorrigo Medical Heliport	Dorrigo, New South Wales	30°20′32″S 152°42′33″E	
YXDH		Royal Darwin Hospital Heliport	Tiwi, Northern Territory	12°21′10″S 130°52′54″E	
YXDM		Derby Medical Heliport	Derby, Tasmania	41°08′42″S 147°48′31″E	
YXDN		Dunedoo Hospital Heliport	Dunedoo, New South Wales	32°00′50″S 149°23′23″E	
YXDR		Munduberra Hospital Heliport	Mundubbera, Queensland	25°35′17″S 151°17′36″E	
YXDT		Gladstone Hospital Heliport	West Gladstone, Queensland	23°50′59″S 151°14′55″E	
YXDU		Dunwich Hospital Heliport	Dunwich, Queensland	27°29′49″S 153°23′57″E	
YXDV		Dover Medical Heliport	Dover, Tasmania	43°19′34″S 146°59′27″E	
YXDY		Dysart Hospital Heliport	Dysart, Queensland	22°34′58″S 148°21′13″E	
YXEA		Eaglehawk Neck Medical Heliport	Eaglehawk Neck, Tasmania	43°00′54″S 147°55′32″E	
YXEE		Moree Hospital Heliport	Moree, New South Wales	29°28′15″S 149°50′26″E	
YXEG		Bellingen Medical Heliport	Bellingen, New South Wales	30°27′13″S 152°54′07″E	
YXEI		Eidsvold Hospital Heliport	Eidsvold, Queensland	25°22′57″S 151°07′31″E	
YXEL		Bothwell Medical Heliport	Bothwell, Tasmania	42°23′15″S 147°00′22″E	
YXEM		Eden Medical Heliport	Eden, New South Wales	37°03′22″S 149°54′38″E	
YXEP		Weipa Hospital Heliport	Trunding, Queensland	12°38′26″S 141°52′01″E	Closed
YXES		Esk Hospital Heliport	Esk, Queensland	27°14′27″S 152°25′05″E	
YXFH		Fiona Stanley Hospital Heliport	Murdoch, Western Australia	32°04′14″S 115°50′49″E	
YXFM		Flinders Medical Centre Heliport	Bedford Park, South Australia	35°01′12″S 138°34′07″E	
YXFO		Forbes Hospital Heliport	Forbes, New South Wales	33°23′45″S 148°00′50″E	
YXFP		Freycinet Peninsula Medical Heliport	Freycinet Peninsula, Tasmania	42°08′48″S 148°16′34″E	
YXFR		Frankston Hospital Heliport	Frankston, Victoria	38°09′00″S 145°07′37″E	
YXFS		Forster Hospital Heliport	Forster, New South Wales	32°11′18″S 152°30′48″E	
YXFV		Newcastle Westpac Base Heliport	Broadmeadow, New South Wales	32°55′13″S 151°43′47″E	
YXGA		Gatton Showgrounds Heliport	Gatton, Queensland	27°33′36″S 152°16′55″E	
YXGC		Gloucester Medical Heliport	Gloucester, New South Wales	32°00′53″S 151°57′36″E	
YXGE		Glen Innes Medical Heliport	Glen Innes, New South Wales	29°43′49″S 151°44′11″E	
YXGG		Glenreagh Medical Heliport	Glenreagh, New South Wales	30°03′00″S 152°59′01″E	
YXGH		Goulburn Hospital Heliport	Goulburn, New South Wales	34°44′53″S 149°42′44″E	
YXGI		Gayndah Hospital Heliport	Gayndah, Queensland	25°37′55″S 151°36′17″E	
YXGL		Grenfell Medical Heliport	Grenfell, New South Wales	33°54′22″S 148°09′42″E	
YXGM		Ingham Health Service Heliport	Ingham, Queensland	18°39′06″S 146°09′50″E	
YXGO		Goondiwindi Hospital Heliport	Goondiwindi, Queensland	28°32′53″S 150°18′05″E	
YXGP		Grafton Hospital Heliport	Grafton, New South Wales	29°40′25″S 152°56′27″E	
YXGR		Gilgandra Hospital Heliport	Gilgandra, New South Wales	31°42′14″S 148°39′55″E	
YXGS		Gosford Hospital Heliport	Gosford, New South Wales	33°25′11″S 151°20′20″E	
YXGT		Gulgong Hospital Heliport	Gulgong, New South Wales	32°21′28″S 149°32′20″E	
YXGU		Gunnedah Hospital Heliport	Gunnedah, New South Wales	30°58′58″S 150°15′08″E	
YXGW		Gundagai Medical Heliport	Gundagai, New South Wales	35°04′05″S 148°06′09″E	
YXGY		Gympie Medical Heliport	Gympie, Queensland	26°11′19″S 152°39′10″E	
YXHA		Hawkesbury Hospital Heliport	Windsor, New South Wales	33°36′38″S 150°49′17″E	
YXHB		Holbrook Medical Heliport	Holbrook, New South Wales	35°43′27″S 147°19′06″E	
YXHC		Charlton Hospital Heliport	Charlton, Victoria	36°16′05″S 143°21′10″E	
YXHE		Hervey Bay Hospital Heliport	Urraween, Queensland	25°18′00″S 152°49′17″E	
YXHG		Gold Coast University Hospital Heliport	Southport, Queensland	27°57′34″S 153°22′55″E	
YXHH		Royal Hobart Hospital Heliport	Hobart, Tasmania	42°52′47″S 147°19′50″E	
YXHK		Hornsby Ku-ring-gai Hospital Heliport	Hornsby, New South Wales	33°42′12″S 151°06′46″E	
YXHS		Sunshine Coast University Hospital Heliport	Birtinya, Queensland	26°44′50″S 153°06′49″E	
YXHT		Charters Towers Hospital Heliport	Charters Towers, Queensland	20°04′33″S 146°15′51″E	
YXHU		Hughenden Hospital Heliport	Hughenden, Queensland	20°50′33″S 144°11′16″E	
YXHY		Hay Hospital Heliport	Hay, New South Wales	34°30′00″S 144°51′09″E	
YXIG		Bingara Medical Heliport	Bingara, New South Wales	29°51′51″S 150°34′47″E	
YXIH		Mount Isa Hospital Heliport	Mornington, Queensland	20°43′47″S 139°29′40″E	
YXIL		Collingullie Medical Heliport	Collingullie, New South Wales	35°05′36″S 147°07′43″E	
YXIP		Ipswich Hospital Heliport	Ipswich, Queensland	27°37′10″S 152°45′38″E	Closed
YXIS		Innisfail Hospital Heliport	Innisfail, Queensland	17°31′06″S 146°01′48″E	
YXIV		Inverell Hospital Heliport	Inverell, New South Wales	29°46′18″S 151°07′53″E	
YXIW		Inglewood Hospital Heliport	Inglewood, Queensland	28°25′06″S 151°03′40″E	
YXJA		Jamison Private Hospital Penrith Heliport	Jamisontown, New South Wales	33°45′46″S 150°40′49″E	Closed
YXJD		Jindabyne Medical Heliport	Jindabyne, New South Wales	36°25′05″S 148°36′55″E	
YXJH		John Hunter Hospital Heliport	New Lambton Heights, New South Wales	32°55′26″S 151°41′37″E	
YXJN		Jandowae Hospital Heliport	Jandowae, Queensland	26°46′53″S 151°06′17″E	
YXJU		Junee Medical Heliport	Junee, New South Wales	34°51′52″S 147°34′46″E	Closed
YXKA		Killarney Medical Heliport	Killarney, Queensland	28°20′31″S 152°17′39″E	
YXKC		Kingscote Hospital Heliport	Kingscote, South Australia	35°38′41″S 137°38′04″E	
YXKH		Kapunda Hospital Heliport	Kapunda, South Australia	34°19′52″S 138°55′19″E	
YXKI		Kilcoy Hospital Heliport	Kilcoy, Queensland	26°56′56″S 152°33′59″E	
YXKL		Kilkivan Medical Heliport	Kilkivan, Queensland	26°04′59″S 152°14′35″E	
YXKN		Kingaroy Hospital Heliport	Kingaroy, Queensland	26°31′57″S 151°50′22″E	
YXKO		Kyogle Hospital Heliport	Kyogle, New South Wales	28°37′42″S 153°00′07″E	
YXKP		Kedron Park SES Base Heliport	Kedron, Queensland	27°24′51″S 153°02′13″E	Closed
YXKR		Karratha Health Campus Heliport	Pegs Creek, Western Australia	20°43′53″S 116°50′26″E	
YXKT		Kyneton District Health Service Heliport	Kyneton, Victoria	37°15′20″S 144°28′14″E	
YXKU		Kurri Kurri District Hospital Heliport	Kurri Kurri, New South Wales	32°49′32″S 151°27′46″E	
YXKW		Blackwater Hospital Heliport	Blackwater, Queensland	23°34′17″S 148°52′41″E	
YXLA		Laidley Hospital Heliport	Laidley, Queensland	27°37′57″S 152°23′57″E	
YXLB		Baralaba Hospital Heliport	Baralaba, Queensland	24°11′05″S 149°48′34″E	Closed
YXLE		Leeton Medical Heliport	Leeton, New South Wales	34°33′35″S 146°24′17″E	
YXLF		Latrobe Hospital Heliport	Latrobe, Tasmania	41°13′42″S 146°25′18″E	
YXLG		Lithgow Medical Heliport	Bowenfels, New South Wales	33°29′58″S 150°07′43″E	
YXLH		Leongatha Hospital Heliport	Leongatha, Victoria	38°29′19″S 145°57′01″E	
YXLL		Liverpool Hospital Heliport	Liverpool, New South Wales	33°55′13″S 150°55′51″E	
YXLM		Lamb Island Heliport	Lamb Island, Queensland	27°37′18″S 153°23′10″E	
YXLN		Coolamon Medical Heliport	Coolamon, New South Wales	34°48′36″S 147°12′15″E	
YXLQ		Lyell McEwin Hospital Heliport	Elizabeth Vale, South Australia	34°44′56″S 138°39′57″E	
YXLR		Millmerran Hospital Heliport	Millmerran, Queensland	27°52′46″S 151°15′47″E	
YXLS		Latrobe Regional Hospital Heliport	Traralgon, Victoria	38°13′10″S 146°28′21″E	
YXLT		Caboolture Hospital Heliport	Caboolture, Queensland	27°04′46″S 152°57′47″E	Closed
YXLU		Launceston General Hospital Heliport	Launceston, Tasmania	41°26′51″S 147°08′25″E	
YXLX		Loxton Hospital Heliport	Loxton, South Australia	34°27′20″S 140°33′52″E	
YXMA		Maclean Hospital Heliport	Maclean, New South Wales	29°27′13″S 153°12′05″E	
YXMB		Mareeba Hospital Heliport	Mareeba, Queensland	16°59′12″S 145°25′32″E	
YXMC		Macleay Island Heliport	Macleay Island, Queensland	27°36′32″S 153°21′22″E	
YXMD		Mount Druitt Hospital Heliport	Mount Druitt, New South Wales	33°45′58″S 150°49′50″E	
YXMG		Murgon Hospital Heliport	Murgon, Queensland	26°14′18″S 151°57′03″E	
YXMH		Mudgee Hospital Heliport	Mudgee, New South Wales	32°36′09″S 149°35′17″E	
YXMI		Meningie Hospital Heliport	Meningie, South Australia	35°41′36″S 139°20′05″E	
YXMJ		Murray Bridge Hospital Heliport	Murray Bridge, South Australia	35°07′42″S 139°16′51″E	
YXMK		Macksville Hospital Heliport	North Macksville, New South Wales	30°42′37″S 152°55′17″E	
YXMM		Mannum Hospital Heliport	Mannum, South Australia	34°55′01″S 139°18′30″E	
YXMN		Moranbah Hospital Heliport	Moranbah, Queensland	22°00′08″S 148°03′19″E	Closed
YXMO		Mossman Hospital Heliport	Mossman, Queensland	16°27′48″S 145°22′05″E	
YXMP		Mount Perry Health Care Centre Heliport	Mount Perry, Queensland	25°10′54″S 151°38′45″E	
YXMQ		Maitland Hospital Heliport	Maitland, South Australia	34°22′16″S 137°40′34″E	
YXMR		Moura Hospital Heliport	Moura, Queensland	24°34′33″S 149°58′34″E	
YXMS		Miles Hospital Heliport	Miles, Queensland	26°39′29″S 150°11′47″E	
YXMT		New Maitland Hospital Heliport	Metford, New South Wales	32°45′34″S 151°36′16″E	
YXMU		Mullumbimby Medical Heliport	Mullumbimby, New South Wales	28°33′34″S 153°29′32″E	
YXMV		Mona Vale Hospital Heliport	Mona Vale, New South Wales	33°41′06″S 151°18′30″E	
YXMW		Merriwa Hospital Heliport	Merriwa, New South Wales	32°08′36″S 150°21′39″E	
YXMX		Minlaton Medical Heliport	Minlaton, South Australia	34°46′03″S 137°35′29″E	
YXMY		Moruya Hospital Heliport	Moruya, New South Wales	35°54′14″S 150°04′10″E	
YXMZ		Manilla Medical Heliport	Manilla, New South Wales	30°45′08″S 150°43′05″E	
YXNA		Nambour Hospital Heliport	Nambour, Queensland	26°37′14″S 152°57′03″E	
YXND		Worrabinda Health Service Heliport	Woorabinda, Queensland	24°08′00″S 149°27′17″E	Closed
YXNE		Nepean Hospital Heliport	Kingswood, New South Wales	33°45′34″S 150°42′54″E	
YXNH		Narrabri Hospital Heliport	Narrabri, New South Wales	30°19′33″S 149°46′38″E	
YXNL		Northern Beaches Hospital Heliport	Frenchs Forest, New South Wales	33°45′03″S 151°14′00″E	
YXNN		Nanango Hospital Heliport	Nanango, Queensland	26°39′57″S 152°00′27″E	
YXNO		Noosa Hospital Heliport	Noosaville, Queensland	26°24′09″S 153°02′44″E	
YXNR		North Rankin Complex Heliport	Offshore Western Australia	19°35′11″S 116°08′20″E	
YXNS		Royal North Shore Hospital Heliport	St Leonards, New South Wales	33°49′16″S 151°11′31″E	
YXNT		Natural Arch Heliport	Natural Bridge, Queensland	28°13′00″S 153°14′03″E	
YXNW		Shoalhaven Memorial Hospital Heliport	Nowra, New South Wales	34°52′12″S 150°35′44″E	Closed
YXNY		Nelson Bay Medical Heliport	Nelson Bay, New South Wales	32°43′00″S 152°09′17″E	
YXOA		Cohuna Hospital Heliport	Cohuna, Victoria	35°47′59″S 144°12′51″E	
YXOD		Oatlands Medical Heliport	Oatlands, Tasmania	42°18′15″S 147°22′00″E	
YXOF		Coffs Harbour Base Hospital Heliport	Coffs Harbour, New South Wales	30°19′01″S 153°05′35″E	
YXOG		Orange Bloomfield Hospital Heliport	Orange, New South Wales	33°19′00″S 149°05′33″E	
YXOH		Coolah Hospital Heliport	Coolah, New South Wales	31°49′19″S 149°42′36″E	
YXOK		Crookwell Rural Fire Service Heliport	Crookwell, New South Wales	34°26′58″S 149°28′09″E	
YXOL		Condobolin Medical Heliport	Condobolin, New South Wales	33°04′52″S 147°08′59″E	
YXOM		Bombala Medical Heliport	Bombala, New South Wales	36°54′50″S 149°14′29″E	
YXON		Coonamble Medical Heliport	Coonamble, New South Wales	30°58′02″S 148°23′14″E	
YXOO		Cootamundra Hospital Heliport	Cootamundra, New South Wales	34°38′02″S 148°00′46″E	
YXOR		O'Reillys Guesthouse Heliport	O'Reilly, Queensland	28°13′54″S 153°08′06″E	
YXOS		Ouse Medical Heliport	Ouse, Tasmania	42°29′10″S 146°42′58″E	
YXOT		Monto Hospital Heliport	Monto, Queensland	24°52′01″S 151°06′46″E	
YXOU		Caloundra Health Service Heliport	Caloundra, Queensland	26°47′59″S 153°07′11″E	Closed
YXOW		Bowral Medical Heliport	Bowral, New South Wales	34°29′12″S 150°25′22″E	
YXPC		Joyce Palmer Health Service Heliport	Palm Island, Queensland	18°43′57″S 146°34′40″E	
YXPD		Port Hedland Hospital Heliport	South Hedland, Western Australia	20°24′52″S 118°35′56″E	
YXPE		Port Pirie Hospital Heliport	Port Pirie, South Australia	33°10′33″S 138°00′19″E	
YXPH		Peak Hill Hospital Heliport	Peak Hill, New South Wales	32°44′10″S 148°11′59″E	
YXPI		Pindara Hospital Heliport	Benowa, Queensland	28°00′29″S 153°23′33″E	
YXPK		Parkes Hospital Heliport	Parkes, New South Wales	33°09′12″S 148°10′16″E	
YXPM		Port Macquarie Base Hospital Heliport	Port Macquarie, New South Wales	31°27′08″S 152°52′36″E	
YXPN		Proserpine Hospital Heliport	Proserpine, Queensland	20°23′57″S 148°35′08″E	
YXPR		Portland Hospital Heliport	Portland, Victoria	38°20′29″S 141°36′23″E	
YXPU		Port Arthur Medical Heliport	Port Arthur, Tasmania	43°08′32″S 147°50′37″E	
YXQC		Queensland Children's Hospital Heliport	South Brisbane, Queensland	27°29′03″S 153°01′37″E	
YXQE		Queen Elizabeth II Medical Centre Heliport	Nedlands, Western Australia	31°58′08″S 115°49′01″E	
YXQU		Quirindi Medical Heliport	Quirindi, New South Wales	31°30′04″S 150°40′36″E	
YXRA		Randwick Medical Heliport	Randwick, New South Wales	33°55′10″S 151°14′21″E	
YXRD		Redland Bay Hospital Heliport	Redland Bay, Queensland	27°37′12″S 153°18′29″E	
YXRH		Tara Hospital Heliport	Tara, Queensland	27°16′23″S 150°27′25″E	
YXRK		Rockhampton Base Hospital Heliport	The Range, Queensland	23°22′47″S 150°29′43″E	
YXRM		Renmark Hospital Heliport	Renmark, South Australia	34°09′49″S 140°44′41″E	
YXRN		Rylstone Hospital Heliport	Rylstone, New South Wales	32°48′14″S 149°58′30″E	
YXRP		Royal Perth Hospital Heliport	Perth, Western Australia	31°57′13″S 115°51′59″E	
YXRU		Russell Island Heliport	Russell Island, Queensland	27°39′27″S 153°22′00″E	
YXSA		Sydney Adventist Hospital Heliport	Wahroonga, New South Wales	33°44′00″S 151°06′00″E	
YXSB		Southcare Base Heliport	Hume, Australian Capital Territory	35°22′43″S 149°10′17″E	
YXSC		Scone Medical Heliport	Scone, New South Wales	32°03′01″S 150°52′40″E	
YXSD		St Helens District Hospital Heliport	St Helens, Tasmania	41°19′06″S 148°14′31″E	
YXSE		Shoalhaven Emergency Management Heliport	South Nowra, New South Wales	34°53′47″S 150°35′26″E	
YXSG		St George Hospital Heliport	Kogarah, New South Wales	33°58′01″S 151°07′58″E	
YXSH		Shellharbour Hospital Heliport	Oak Flats, New South Wales	34°33′36″S 150°50′30″E	
YXSI		Singleton Hospital Heliport	Singleton, New South Wales	32°34′01″S 151°11′13″E	
YXSM		St Marys Medical Heliport	St Marys, Tasmania	41°35′14″S 148°11′03″E	
YXSO		Scottsdale Medical Heliport	Scottsdale, Tasmania	41°09′28″S 147°30′43″E	
YXST		Stanthorpe Hospital Heliport	Stanthorpe, Queensland	28°39′36″S 151°55′40″E	
YXSU		Sutherland Hospital Heliport	Caringbah, New South Wales	34°02′20″S 151°06′56″E	
YXSW		Swansea Medical Heliport	Swansea, Tasmania	42°07′34″S 148°04′41″E	
YXSY		Strathalbyn Medical Heliport	Strathalbyn, South Australia	35°15′38″S 138°53′10″E	
YXTA		Tangalooma Resort Heliport	Moreton Bay, Queensland	27°10′55″S 153°22′17″E	
YXTB		Triabunna Medical Heliport	Triabunna, Tasmania	42°30′35″S 147°54′43″E	
YXTD		Trundle Medical Heliport	Trundle, New South Wales	32°55′17″S 147°42′16″E	Closed
YXTE		Tenterfield Medical Heliport	Tenterfield, New South Wales	29°02′53″S 152°00′59″E	
YXTI		Thursday Island Hospital Heliport	Thursday Island, Queensland	10°35′19″S 142°12′35″E	
YXTL		Townsville Hospital Northwest Heliport	Douglas, Queensland	19°19′13″S 146°45′38″E	
YXTM		Tamborine Mountain Heliport	Tamborine Mountain, Queensland	27°55′58″S 153°11′00″E	
YXTN		Tanunda Medical Heliport	Tanunda, South Australia	34°31′16″S 138°58′57″E	
YXTO		Toowoomba Base Hospital Heliport	South Toowoomba, Queensland	27°34′13″S 151°56′45″E	
YXTR		Wrigley Park Heliport	Taree, New South Wales	31°54′23″S 152°27′03″E	
YXTS		Townsville Hospital Southeast Heliport	Douglas, Queensland	19°19′21″S 146°46′00″E	
YXTT		Tumut Hospital Heliport	Tumut, New South Wales	35°18′29″S 148°13′09″E	Closed
YXTU		Tully Hospital Heliport	Tully, Queensland	17°55′37″S 145°55′24″E	
YXTV		Tweed Valley Hospital Heliport	Cudgen, New South Wales	28°15′50″S 153°33′59″E	
YXTW		Tamworth Hospital Heliport	North Tamworth, New South Wales	31°04′20″S 150°55′36″E	
YXTX		Texas Multipurpose Health Service Heliport	Texas, Queensland	28°51′19″S 151°10′44″E	
YXUA		Milton Ulladulla Hospital Heliport	Milton, New South Wales	35°19′15″S 150°26′22″E	
YXUD		Cudal Medical Heliport	Cudal, New South Wales	33°16′48″S 148°44′36″E	
YXUH		Macquarie University Hospital Heliport	Macquarie Park, New South Wales	33°45′57″S 151°06′58″E	
YXUS		Muswellbrook Hospital Heliport	Muswellbrook, New South Wales	32°15′51″S 150°53′54″E	
YXVH		Victorian Heart Hospital Heliport	Clayton, Victoria	37°54′45″S 145°08′24″E	
YXVL		Bowraville Medical Heliport	South Arm, New South Wales	30°38′52″S 152°50′53″E	
YXWA		Warwick Hospital Heliport	Warwick, Queensland	28°13′26″S 152°01′00″E	
YXWG		Wagga Wagga Base Hospital Heliport	Wagga Wagga, New South Wales	35°07′09″S 147°21′26″E	
YXWH		Walcha Medical Heliport	Walcha, New South Wales	30°59′13″S 151°35′41″E	
YXWI		Werris Creek Medical Heliport	Werris Creek, New South Wales	31°20′24″S 150°38′55″E	
YXWL		Wollongong Hospital Heliport	Wollongong, New South Wales	34°25′27″S 150°52′56″E	
YXWM		Westmead Children's Hospital Heliport	Westmead, New South Wales	33°48′08″S 150°59′37″E	
YXWO		Wondai Medical Heliport	Wondai, Queensland	26°18′54″S 151°52′52″E	
YXWS		Westmead Central Acute Services Building Heliport	Westmead, New South Wales	33°48′09″S 150°59′24″E	
YXWT		Wellington Medical Heliport	Wellington, New South Wales	32°32′55″S 148°56′59″E	
YXWU		Woolgoolga Medical Heliport	Woolgoolga, New South Wales	30°07′02″S 153°12′13″E	
YXWW		Wee Waa Hospital Heliport	Wee Waa, New South Wales	30°13′32″S 149°26′51″E	
YXWY		Wyong Hospital Heliport	Hamlyn Terrace, New South Wales	33°15′37″S 151°28′51″E	
YXXL		Box Hill Hospital Heliport	Box Hill, Victoria	37°48′49″S 145°07′08″E	
YXXM		Monash Children's Hospital Heliport	Clayton, Victoria	37°55′11″S 145°07′26″E	
YXYA		Yass Hospital Heliport	Yass, New South Wales	34°51′16″S 148°54′30″E	
YXYK		Yorketown Hospital Heliport	Yorketown, South Australia	35°01′08″S 137°36′42″E	
YXYO		Young Hospital Heliport	Young, New South Wales	34°19′16″S 148°17′17″E	
YXYR		Ayr Hospital Heliport	Ayr, Queensland	19°33′53″S 147°24′34″E	

== YY ==
ICAO	IATA	Airport name	Community	Coordinates	Notes
YYAA		Yandama Airstrip	Milparinka, New South Wales	29°39′54″S 141°24′50″E	
YYAB		Yackabindie Airstrip	Sir Samuel, Western Australia	27°34′02″S 120°31′49″E	
YYAC		Yacamunda Airstrip	Mount Coolon, Queensland	21°22′43″S 147°06′01″E	
YYAG		Yagga Yagga Southeast Aerodrome	Tanami, Western Australia	20°57′57″S 128°05′49″E	
YYAK		Yalkulka Airstrip	Southedge, Queensland	16°43′53″S 145°20′51″E	
YYAL	YLG	Yalgoo Airport	Yalgoo, Western Australia	28°21′19″S 116°41′02″E	
YYAM		Yalamurra Airstrip	Adavale, Queensland	26°39′15″S 145°17′12″E	
YYAN		Yangunbi Airstrip	East Arnhem, Northern Territory	12°17′19″S 136°39′32″E	Closed
YYAR		Mount Yarrabah Heliport	Yarrabah, Queensland	16°54′15″S 145°50′31″E	
YYAS		Yass Heliport	Yass, New South Wales	34°49′20″S 148°54′28″E	
YYAW		Yalcawinna Airfield	Broken Hill, New South Wales	31°42′43″S 141°48′18″E	
YYAY		Yinyikay Airstrip	East Arnhem, Northern Territory	12°12′45″S 136°14′08″E	
YYBE		Yarrabee Mine Airstrip	Jellinbah, Queensland	23°15′43″S 149°00′59″E	Road airstrip
YYBH		Yarrabah Heliport	Yarrabah, Queensland	16°54′35″S 145°52′13″E	
YYCA		Yancannia Airstrip	White Cliffs, New South Wales	30°30′16″S 142°54′41″E	
YYDE		Yandee Airstrip	Marble Bar, Western Australia	21°22′06″S 118°52′52″E	
YYDM		Yundamindera Airstrip	Leonora, Western Australia	29°07′14″S 122°02′29″E	
YYDN		Yarraden Airstrip	Yarraden, Queensland	14°18′13″S 143°18′39″E	
YYDY		Yuduyudu Seaplane Base	East Arnhem, Northern Territory	12°13′40″S 136°38′11″E	
YYEA		Yeaburn Airstrip	Homewood, Victoria	37°10′33″S 145°19′23″E	
YYER		Yerilla Aerodrome	Kookynie, Western Australia	29°28′03″S 121°49′48″E	
YYGG		Yagga Yagga Northwest Airstrip	Tanami, Western Australia	20°53′26″S 127°56′56″E	
YYIN		Yinnietharra Station Airstrip	West Lyons River, Western Australia	24°39′17″S 116°10′23″E	
YYKA		Yaraka Airstrip	Yaraka, Queensland	24°53′35″S 144°03′41″E	
YYKI	OKR	Yorke Island Airport	Yorke Island, Queensland	09°45′08″S 143°24′16″E	
YYLD		Yalda Downs Homestead Aerodrome	White Cliffs, New South Wales	30°15′41″S 142°58′37″E	
YYLG		Yallalong Homestead Aerodrome	Murchison, Western Australia	27°25′35″S 115°31′05″E	
YYLK		Yalakun Station Airstrip	East Arnhem, Northern Territory	12°15′44″S 136°00′37″E	
YYLL		Yellow Bank Junction Airstrip	Westgrove, Queensland	25°26′52″S 148°27′20″E	
YYLR	KYF	Yeelirrie Airport	Yeelirrie Station, Western Australia	27°16′37″S 120°05′44″E	
YYME		Yarrowmere Airstrip	Pentland, Queensland	21°27′48″S 145°51′25″E	
YYMI	XMY	Yam Island Airport	Yam Island, Queensland	09°53′57″S 142°46′28″E	
YYND	YUE	Yuendumu Airport	Yuendumu, Northern Territory	22°15′15″S 131°46′55″E	
YYNG	NGA	Young Airport	Young, New South Wales	34°15′20″S 148°14′53″E	
YYNR		Yanrey Airstrip	Yannarie, Western Australia	22°30′41″S 114°47′54″E	
YYOO		Yalymboo Airstrip	Yalymboo, South Australia	31°48′12″S 136°51′36″E	
YYOR	ORR	Yorketown Airport	Yorketown, South Australia	35°00′12″S 137°37′10″E	
YYRK		York Airstrip	York, Western Australia	31°51′18″S 116°47′56″E	Closed
YYRM		Yarram Airport	Yarram, Victoria	38°34′00″S 146°45′18″E	
YYRN		Yamarna Airstrip	Cosmo Newbery, Western Australia	28°09′18″S 123°40′30″E	
YYRW		Yarlarweelor Airstrip	Peak Hill, Western Australia	25°27′30″S 117°58′30″E	Coordinates unverified
YYTA	KYI	Yalata Mission Airport	Yalata, South Australia	31°28′14″S 131°49′30″E	
YYUM		Yuinmery Airstrip	Sandstone, Western Australia	28°33′47″S 119°01′08″E	
YYUN		Yunta Airstrip	Yunta, South Australia	32°34′19″S 139°33′51″E	
YYWA		Yowah Aerodrome	Yowah, Queensland	27°57′11″S 144°37′40″E	
YYWG		Yarrawonga Airport	Yarrawonga, Victoria	36°01′50″S 146°01′40″E	
YYYA		Mugarinya Airstrip	Marble Bar, Western Australia	21°17′08″S 118°23′07″E	

== YZ ==
ICAO	IATA	Airport name	Community	Coordinates
YZAN		Zanthus Airstrip	Zanthus, Western Australia	31°02′11″S 123°34′04″E
YZCE		Churchable Airstrip	Churchable, Queensland	27°25′48″S 152°22′42″E
YZHN		Zeehan Airstrip	Zeehan, Tasmania	41°53′20″S 145°21′03″E
YZON		Zone Five Aerodrome	Brookhampton, Western Australia	33°39′59″S 115°54′11″E
