= Goolwa =

Goolwa may also refer to:

- Goolwa, South Australia, a town and locality
- The Goolwa (clipper ship)
- Goolwa Airport, an airport in South Australia
- Goolwa Barrages, a series of tidal barrages in the River Murray in South Australia
- Goolwa cockle, a common name for the mollusc, Plebidonax deltoides
- Goolwa railway station, a heritage railway station in South Australia
- Hundred of Goolwa, a cadastral unit in South Australia

== See also ==
- Goolwa Beach
- Goolwa North
- Goolwa South
