= CFH =

CFH may refer to:

- Coach Fred Hoiberg, Iowa State University men's basketball coach
- Complement Factor H, a complement control protein
- NHS Connecting for Health, The UK Agency delivering the NHS National Programme for IT, usually written "CfH"
- Chase Farm Hospital, a hospital in London
- Chafford Hundred railway station, Essex, England, National Rail station code "CFH"
- Call for Help, an American/Canadian television show about computing and technology
- Cowboys from Hell, a groove metal album by Pantera
- Unit of gas flow of standard cubic feet per hour.
- Clifton Hills Landing Strip, IATA airport code "CFH"
