= Naracoorte =

Naracoorte may refer to:

- Naracoorte, South Australia, a town and locality
- Naracoorte Airport
- Naracoorte Coastal Plain (biogeographic region)
- Naracoorte woodlands, a WWF ecoregion - refer List of ecoregions in Australia
- District Council of Naracoorte, a former local government area, now part of Naracoorte Lucindale Council

== See also ==
- Naracoorte Caves National Park
  - Naracoorte Caves Conservation Park
  - Naracoorte Caves Conservation Reserve
- The Naracoorte Herald
