= KBY =

KBY may refer to:

- Yeshivat Kerem B'Yavneh, a village in Israel often abbreviated as KBY
- Kebayoran railway station, station code KBY
- Streaky Bay Airport, IATA airport code "KBY"
