= LGH =

LGH may refer to:

== Places ==
=== Australia ===
- Launceston General Hospital, Tasmania
- Leigh Creek Airport, South Australia (IATA:LGH)

=== Canada ===
- Lakeshore General Hospital, Quebec
- Lions Gate Hospital, British Columbia

=== Elsewhere ===
- Lahore General Hospital, Pakistan
- Landesgymnasium für Hochbegabte, school in Schwäbisch Gmünd, Germany
- Leicester General Hospital, England
- Lowell General Hospital, Massachusetts, US

== Other uses ==
- Leibgarde der Hartschier, life guard of the Kingdom of Bavaria
