= RCN =

RCN may refer to:

== Broadcasting and internet ==
- RCN Corporation (formerly Residential Communications Network), a cable television, telephone, and internet service provider in the United States
- Radio Cadena Nacional (disambiguation), a broadcast network in Colombia
  - RCN Radio
  - RCN Televisión
    - RCN Nuestra Tele Internacional, an international pay television channel owned by RCN Televisión
- Radiowe Centrum Nadawcze (English: radio broadcasting center), Polish designation for a broadcasting transmitter

== Other uses ==
- RCN, the IATA airport code for American River Airpark in the Australian state of South Australia
- RCN Foundation, an independent UK charitable trust that supports nursing to improve health and the well-being of the public
- RCN Series, a sequence of stand-alone science fiction novels by David Drake, centering around an officer in the Republic of Cinnabar Navy
- Reality Check Network, a software based warez magazine that existed from 1995 to 1997
- Red Cross Nordic United World College, a boarding school in Norway
- Reformed Church of Newtown, a church in Queens, New York, U.S.
- Research Council of Norway, a Norwegian government agency that funds research and innovation projects
- Royal Canadian Navy, the naval force of Canada
- Royal College of Nursing, a professional membership organisation of the United Kingdom
- Rundstrecken Challenge Nürburgring, a motorsport event series held mainly on the Nürburgring complex in Germany
