= Oodnadatta Airport =

Airport in South Australia

- IATA: ODD; ICAO: YOOD

Summary
- Airport type: Public
- Operator: Outback Communities Authority
- Location: Oodnadatta, South Australia, Australia
- Elevation AMSL: 386 ft (118 m)
- Coordinates: 27°33′36″S 135°26′42″E

Map
- Location in South Australia

Runways
Direction	Length		Surface
Direction	m	ft	Surface
04/22	932	3,058
13/31	1,286	4,219
- Sources: Australian AIP and aerodrome chart

Oodnadatta Airport (IATA: ODD, ICAO: YOOD) is an aerodrome that services Oodnadatta, South Australia, Australia.

== History ==
Oodnadatta airport was utilised by the Royal Australian Air Force's No. 34 Squadron to courier equipment and stores, transport troops and utilised by RAAF and United States Army Air Force fighter and bomber aircraft en route to Darwin, Northern Territory.

The airport held the record for the hottest temperature recorded in Australia. On 2 January 1960 the temperature was recorded at 50.7 °C (123 °F).

== See also ==
- List of airports in South Australia
- Oodnadatta § Climate – climate data
