= Loxton Airport =

- IATA: none; ICAO: YLOX

Summary
- Airport type: Public
- Owner/Operator: District Council of Loxton Waikerie
- Location: Loxton, South Australia
- Elevation AMSL: 125 ft / 38 m
- Coordinates: 34°28′30″S 140°39′48″E

Map
- Location in South Australia

Runways
Direction	Length		Surface
Direction	m	ft	Surface
08/26	1,186	3,891	Gravel
17/35	854	2,802	Sand/silt
- Sources: Australian AIP

Loxton Airport (ICAO: YLOX) is located 5 nautical miles (9.3 km; 5.8 mi) east of Loxton, South Australia.

== See also ==
- List of airports in South Australia
