= Cleve Airport =

- IATA: CVC; ICAO: YCEE

Summary
- Airport type: Public
- Owner/Operator: Cleve District Council
- Location: Cleve, South Australia
- Elevation AMSL: 589 ft / 180 m
- Coordinates: 33°42′36″S 136°30′18″E
- Website: www.cleve.sa.gov.au

Map
- Location in South Australia

Runways
Direction	Length		Surface
Direction	m	ft	Surface
08/26	1,350	4,429	Asphalt
18/36	895	2,936	Natural
- Sources: Australian AIP and aerodrome chart

Cleve Airport (IATA: CVC, ICAO: YCEE) is an airport located 0.5 nautical miles (0.93 km; 0.58 mi) east of Cleve, South Australia.

== See also ==
- List of airports in South Australia
