= Alton Downs Airport =

Airport in South Australia

- IATA: AWN; ICAO: YADS

Summary
- Airport type: Private
- Location: Alton Downs, South Australia
- Elevation AMSL: 95 ft / 29 m
- Coordinates: 26°29′19″S 139°15′36″E

Map
- Location in South Australia

Runways
Direction	Length		Surface
Direction	ft	m	Surface
17/35	3,772	1,150	Dirt

Alton Downs Airport (IATA: AWN, ICAO: YADS) is a small, privately owned airport in Alton Downs, South Australia.

== Facilities ==
The airport has one dirt runway with a heading of around 17/35.

== See also ==
- List of airports in South Australia
