= List of airports in South Australia =

This is a list of airports in the Australian state of South Australia.

== List of airports ==
The list is sorted by the name of the community served, click the sort buttons in the table header to switch listing order. Airports named in bold are Designated International Airports, even if they have limited or no scheduled international services.

Community	Airport name	Type	ICAO	IATA	Coordinates
Adelaide	**Adelaide Airport**	Public	YPAD	ADL	34°56′42″S 138°31′50″E
Aldinga	Aldinga Airfield	Public	YADG		35°17′23.12″S 138°29′35.05″E
Alton Downs	Alton Downs Airport	Private	YADS	AWN	26°29′19″S 139°15′36″E
Amata	Amata Airport	Private	YAMT	AMT	26°5.8′0″S 131°12.2′0″E
American River	American River Airpark	Private		RCN	35°48′44″S 137°44′11″E
Andamooka	Andamooka Airport	Public	YAMK	ADO	30°26′18″S 137°08′12″E
Balcanoona	Balcanoona Airport	Private	YBLC	LCN	30°32′6″S 139°20′13″E
Brukunga	Claremont Airbase	Private	YCLB		34°59′31″S 138°55′37″E
Carrapateena mine	Carrapateena Airport	Private	YCPT		31°18.5′S 137°26.6′E
Ceduna	Ceduna Airport	Public	YCDU	CED	32°07′50″S 133°42′35″E
Cleve	Cleve Airport	Public	YCEE	CVC	33°42′36″S 136°30′18″E
Clifton Hills	Clifton Hills Landing Strip	Public	YCFH	CFH	27°0′55″S 138°53′31″E
Coober Pedy	Coober Pedy Airport	Public	YCBP	CPD	29°02′24″S 134°43′18″E
Coorabie	Coorabie Airport	Public		CRJ	31°53′40″S 132°17′46″E
Cordillo Downs	Cordillo Downs Airport	Private	YCOD	ODL	26°44′43″S 140°38′17″E
Cowarie	Cowarie Airport	Public	YCWI	CWR	27°42′45″S 138°19′41″E
Cowell	Cowell Airport	Public	YCWL	CCW	33°40′00″S 136°53′30″E
Dulkaninna	Dulkaninna Airport	Public	YDLK	DLK	29°1′24″S 138°28′49″E
Edinburgh	RAAF Base Edinburgh	Military	YPED		34°42′09″S 138°37′15″E
Etadunna	Etadunna Airstrip	Public	YEDA	ETD	28°43′59″S 138°33′4″E
Gawler	Gawler Aerodrome	Private	YGAW		34°36′00″S 138°43′08″E
Goolwa	Goolwa Airport	Private	YGWA		35°28′54″S 138°45′06″E
Jacinth Ambrosia Mine	Jacinth Ambrosia Airport	Private	YJAC		30°54′06″S 132°11′00″E
Kadina	Kadina Airport	Public	YKDI		33°58′12″S 137°39′36″E
Kimba	Kimba Airport	Public	YIMB		33°05′59″S 136°27′35″E
Kingscote	Kingscote Airport	Public	YKSC	KGC	35°42′50″S 137°31′18″E
Leigh Creek	Leigh Creek Airport	Private	YLEC	LGH	30°35′47″S 138°25′31″E
Loxton	Loxton Airport	Public	YLOX		34°28′30″S 140°39′48″E
Moomba	Moomba Airport	Private	YOOM	MOO	28°06′00″S 140°11′48″E
Mount Gambier	Mount Gambier Airport	Public	YMTG	MGB	37°44′44″S 140°47′07″E
Murray Bridge	Murray Bridge Airport	Private	YMBD		35°04′00″S 139°13′36″E
Naracoorte	Naracoorte Airport	Public	YNRC	NAC	36°59′06″S 140°43′05″E
North Shields	Port Lincoln Airport	Public	YPLC	PLO	34°36′19″S 135°52′49″E
Olympic Dam	Olympic Dam Airport	Private	YOLD	OLP	30°29′06″S 136°52′36″E
Oodnadatta	Oodnadatta Airport	Public	YOOD	ODD	27°33′36″S 135°26′42″E
Parafield, Adelaide	Parafield Airport	Public	YPPF		34°47′36″S 138°37′59″E
Port Augusta	Port Augusta Airport	Public	YPAG	PUG	32°30′25″S 137°43′00″E
Port Pirie	Port Pirie Airport	Public	YPIR	PPI	33°14′20″S 137°59′42″E
Prominent Hill Mine	Prominent Hill Airport	Private	YPMH	PXH	29°43′00″S 135°31′18″E
Renmark	Renmark Airport	Public	YREN	RMK	34°11′48″S 140°40′24″E
Streaky Bay	Streaky Bay Airport	Public	YKBY	KBY	32°50′01″S 134°17′36″E
Tumby Bay	Tumby Bay Airport	Public	YTBB		34°21′40″S 136°05′42″E
Waikerie	Waikerie Airport	Public	YWKI		34°11′00″S 140°01′48″E
Whyalla	Whyalla Airport	Public	YWHA	WYA	33°03′32″S 137°30′52″E
William Creek	William Creek Airport	Private	YWMC		28°54′24″S 136°20′30″E
Woomera	RAAF Woomera Airfield	Military	YPWR	UMR	31°08′39″S 136°49′01″E
Wudinna	Wudinna Airport	Public	YWUD	WUD	33°02′36″S 135°26′48″E
Yorketown	Yorketown Airport	Public	YYOR	ORR	35°00′12″S 137°37′10″E

== Defunct airports ==
Community	Airport name	Type	ICAO	IATA	Coordinates
Hendon, Adelaide	Hendon Aerodrome, Captain Butler's Aerodrome	Public			34.872°S 138.515°E
Mallala	RAAF Base Mallala	Military			34°24′54″S 138°30′17″E

== See also ==
- List of airports in Australia
