= Radio Cadena Nacional =

Radio Cadena Nacional may refer to:

- RCN Radio, a Colombian radio network
- RCN Televisión, a Colombian television network
  - RCN Nuestra Tele Internacional, an international pay television channel owned by RCN Televisión

== See also ==
- Cadena nacional, a national network in several Latin American countries
- RCN (disambiguation)
