= Tumby Bay Airport =

- IATA: none; ICAO: YTBB

Summary
- Airport type: Public
- Operator: District Council of Tumby Bay
- Location: Tumby Bay, South Australia
- Elevation AMSL: 32 ft / 10 m
- Coordinates: 34°21′40″S 136°05′42″E

Map
- Location in South Australia

Runways
Direction	Length		Surface
Direction	m	ft	Surface
15/33	1,097	3,599	Gravel
- Sources: Australian AIP and aerodrome chart

Tumby Bay Airport (ICAO: YTBB) is located at Tumby Bay, South Australia.

== See also ==
- List of airports in South Australia
