= Goolwa Airport =

- IATA: none; ICAO: YGWA

Summary
- Airport type: Private
- Owner: Geoff Eastwood
- Operator: Goolwa Airport
- Serves: Fleurieu Peninsula
- Location: Goolwa, South Australia
- Elevation AMSL: 104 ft (32 m)
- Coordinates: 35°28′44″S 138°44′41″E
- Website: www.goolwaairport.com.au

Map
- Location in South Australia

Runways
| Direction | Length | | Surface |
| Direction | m | ft | Surface |
|---|---|---|---|
| 01/19 | 1,500 | 4,921 | Bitumen |
| 09/27 | 680 | 2,231 | Grass |
| 16/34 | 1,000 | 3,281 | Grass |
- Sources: AIP, Goolwa Airport

Goolwa Airport (ICAO: YGWA) is an airport located in Goolwa, South Australia 2.2 nautical miles (4.1 km; 2.5 mi) northwest of the town centre. The facility is primarily used for recreational flying and general aviation. The airport hosts the Goolwa Classic Air Show, the biggest non-military air show in South Australia.

== Runway ==
Goolwa Airport has three runways:

- Runway 01/19 1,500 m (4,921 ft) Bitumen
- Runway 09/27 680 m (2,231 ft) Grass
- Runway 16/34 1,000 m (3,281 ft) Grass

== Flying school ==
Home of Goolwa Air flight training currently operating out of Goolwa Airport.

The airfield is the site for RA-Aus flight training school approved by the Recreational Aviation Australia.

== See also ==
- List of airports in South Australia
