= Leigh Creek Airport =

- IATA: LGH; ICAO: YLEC

Summary
- Airport type: Public
- Operator: Outback Communities Authority
- Location: Leigh Creek, South Australia
- Elevation AMSL: 856 ft / 261 m
- Coordinates: 30°35′54″S 138°25′36″E

Map
- Location in South Australia

Runways
| Direction | Length | | Surface |
| Direction | m | ft | Surface |
|---|---|---|---|
| 11/29 | 1,710 | 5,610 | Asphalt |
| 02/20 | 1,219 | 3,999 | Asphalt |
- Sources: Australian AIP and aerodrome chart Location; Operator

Leigh Creek Airport (IATA: LGH, ICAO: YLEC) is located 1 nautical mile (1.9 km; 1.2 mi) east of the town centre in the locality of Leigh Creek, South Australia.

== Charter operators ==
| Airlines | Destinations |
|---|---|
| Sharp Airlines | Charter: Adelaide |

== See also ==
- List of airports in South Australia
