= Troughton Island Airport =

Airport in Western Australia

- IATA: none; ICAO: YTTI

Summary
- Airport type: Private
- Operator: ShoreAir Pty Ltd
- Location: Troughton Island
- Elevation AMSL: 27 ft / 8 m
- Coordinates: 13°45′06″S 126°08′54″E}

Map
- Location in Western Australia

Runways
Direction	Length		Surface
Direction	m	ft	Surface
14/32	982	3,222
- Sources: Australian AIP and aerodrome chart

Troughton Island Airport (ICAO: YTTI) is located on Troughton Island, in the Kimberley region of Western Australia.

== See also ==
- List of airports in Western Australia
- Transport in Australia § Aviation
