= American River Airpark =

Airport in South Australia

- IATA: RCN; ICAO: none

Summary
- Airport type: Private
- Operator: Privately Owned
- Location: American River; Kangaroo Island; South Australia
- Focus city for: American River
- Elevation AMSL: 233 ft / 71 m
- Coordinates: 35°48′44″S 137°44′12″E

Map
- Location in South Australia

Runways
Direction	Length		Surface
Direction	ft	m	Surface
1 (17/35)	3,281	1,000	Dirt

American River Airpark (IATA: RCN) is a privately owned airfield on Kangaroo Island in the Australian state of South Australia located in the locality of American River. The airport is privately owned and operated as part of a scenic flight service within Kangaroo Island Connect and is also used by Wrightsair.

== Facilities ==
The airfield has one runway.

Runway 1 is the main runway which is a dirt strip where almost all of the flights leave off of. It has a total length of around 1,000 metres (3,300 ft). The runway's heading is approximately 17/35.

== See also ==
- List of airports in South Australia
