= Clifton Hills Landing Strip =

Airport in Australia

- IATA: CFH; ICAO: YCFH

Summary
- Airport type: Public
- Location: Clifton Hills Station, South Australia
- Elevation AMSL: 98 ft / 30 m
- Coordinates: 27°01′06″S 138°53′31″E

Map
- Location in South Australia

Runways
Direction	Length		Surface
Direction	ft	m	Surface
1 (03/21)	2,952	900	Dirt
2 (11/29)	2,624	800	Dirt

Clifton Hills Landing Strip (IATA: CFH, ICAO: YCFH) also known as Clifton Hills Airport, is a landing strip in Clifton Hills Station, South Australia.

== Facilities ==
The airport has 2 runways.

- Runway 1: This is the main runway with a length of 2952 ft (900 m), has a surface material of dirt and an approximate heading of 03/21.
- Runway 2: The runway's length is 2624 ft (800 m), also has a surface material of dirt, and an approximate heading of 11/29.

== See also ==
- List of airports in South Australia
