= Yorketown Airport =

- IATA: ORR; ICAO: YYOR

Summary
- Airport type: Public
- Owner: Yorke Peninsula Council
- Location: Yorketown, South Australia
- Elevation AMSL: 559 ft / 170 m
- Coordinates: 35°00′12″S 137°37′10″E

Map
- Location in South Australia

Runways
Direction	Length		Surface
Direction	ft	m	Surface
17/35	3,543	1,080	Gravel

Yorketown Airport (IATA: ORR, ICAO: YYOR) is a regional, uncontrolled airport located in Yorketown on the Yorke Peninsula, South Australia. The airfield is run and operated by the Yorke Peninsula Council.

The airfield is used as an emergency landing strip for the RFDS service, but it is also open for public use.

== Facilities ==
The airfield has one paved runway with the heading of 17/35. The airfield has basic landing lights, aircraft parking, windsock, toilets and a water station. The airfield does not have avgas.

== See also ==
- List of airports in South Australia
