= Naracoorte Airport =

- IATA: NAC; ICAO: YNRC

Summary
- Airport type: Public
- Operator: Naracoorte Lucindale Council
- Location: Naracoorte, South Australia
- Elevation AMSL: 139 ft (42 m)
- Coordinates: 36°59′06″S 140°43′05″E

Map
- Location in South Australia

Runways
Direction	Length		Surface
Direction	m	ft	Surface
08/26	1,048	3,438	Asphalt
02/20	1,118	3,668	Clay/sand
- Sources: Australian AIP and aerodrome chart

Naracoorte Airport (IATA: NAC, ICAO: YNRC) is located 2 nautical miles (3.7 km; 2.3 mi) south of the town centre in Naracoorte, South Australia.

== See also ==
- List of airports in South Australia
