= Troughton Island =

Island off the Kimberley coast of Western Australia

Troughton Island Western Australia
- Coordinates: 13°45′S 126°08′E
- Elevation: 27 m (89 ft)
- Area: 0.93 km^{2} (0.4 sq mi)
- Time zone: AWST (UTC+8)
- Location: 80 km (50 mi) NW of Kalumburu; 45 km (28 mi) NW of Mungalalu Truscott Airbase
- State electorate(s): Kimberley
- Federal division(s): Durack
| Mean max temp | Mean min temp | Annual rainfall |
| 31.2 °C; 88 °F | 25.5 °C; 78 °F | 812.0 mm 32 in |

Troughton Island is an island located off the Kimberley coast of Western Australia, at the entrance of Vansittart Bay, about 80 kilometres (50 mi) north-west of Kalumburu and 45 kilometres (28 mi) north-west of the Mungalalu Truscott Airbase. Troughton Island is used as a helicopter base for the Timor Sea oil rigs approximately 500 kilometres (300 mi) west of Darwin.

== History ==
The island was found and named in 1819 by Phillip Parker King. The Sir Graham Moore Islands Airline company ShoreAir Pty Ltd has opened and operated an airport on the island since the 1960s. It is a reference point for hydrographic surveys.

== Climate ==
Under the Köppen climate classification, Troughton Island has a hot semi-arid climate (BSh), bordering on a tropical savanna climate, with a sweltering and oppressively humid wet season from December to March and a hot dry season from April to November.

Climate data for Troughton Island, elevation 6 m (20 ft), (1996–2020 normals, extremes 1957–present)
| Month | Jan | Feb | Mar | Apr | May | Jun | Jul | Aug | Sep | Oct | Nov | Dec | Year |
|---|---|---|---|---|---|---|---|---|---|---|---|---|---|
| Record high °C (°F) | 36.3 (97.3) | 35.2 (95.4) | 35.4 (95.7) | 36.3 (97.3) | 35.4 (95.7) | 33.9 (93.0) | 32.0 (89.6) | 35.6 (96.1) | 34.4 (93.9) | 35.6 (96.1) | 35.6 (96.1) | 36.4 (97.5) | 36.4 (97.5) |
| Mean daily maximum °C (°F) | 31.9 (89.4) | 31.8 (89.2) | 32.3 (90.1) | 33.0 (91.4) | 31.5 (88.7) | 29.4 (84.9) | 28.7 (83.7) | 29.2 (84.6) | 30.7 (87.3) | 32.2 (90.0) | 33.4 (92.1) | 33.0 (91.4) | 31.4 (88.6) |
| Mean daily minimum °C (°F) | 26.6 (79.9) | 26.6 (79.9) | 26.9 (80.4) | 27.2 (81.0) | 25.7 (78.3) | 23.6 (74.5) | 22.5 (72.5) | 22.7 (72.9) | 24.8 (76.6) | 26.7 (80.1) | 27.9 (82.2) | 27.5 (81.5) | 25.7 (78.3) |
| Record low °C (°F) | 20.0 (68.0) | 20.0 (68.0) | 21.1 (70.0) | 22.3 (72.1) | 17.2 (63.0) | 15.5 (59.9) | 15.0 (59.0) | 18.2 (64.8) | 20.5 (68.9) | 18.4 (65.1) | 22.2 (72.0) | 20.6 (69.1) | 15.0 (59.0) |
| Average rainfall mm (inches) | 274.8 (10.82) | 159.3 (6.27) | 110.1 (4.33) | 40.5 (1.59) | 29.6 (1.17) | 4.7 (0.19) | 1.0 (0.04) | 0.7 (0.03) | 0.3 (0.01) | 3.6 (0.14) | 13.6 (0.54) | 187.3 (7.37) | 825.5 (32.5) |
| Average rainy days (≥ 1.0 mm) | 12.1 | 8.2 | 6.9 | 2.6 | 1.7 | 0.4 | 0.2 | 0.0 | 0.0 | 0.5 | 1.6 | 7.0 | 41.2 |
Source: Australian Bureau of Meteorology (rain 2000-2020)
