= North Macksville, New South Wales =

Locality in New South Wales

North Macksville New South Wales
- Coordinates: 30.69°S 152.94°E
- Postcode(s): 2447
- LGA(s): Nambucca Valley Council
- State electorate(s): Oxley
- Federal division(s): Cowper
Localities around North Macksville:
Wirrimbi	Newee Creek	Nambucca Heads
Congarinni North	North Macksville
	Macksville	Gumma

North Macksville is a locality on the north (left) bank of the Nambucca River in the Mid North Coast region of New South Wales, Australia. It is connected by a bridge to Macksville on the south side of the river.

The Macksville Bridge took four years to build and was completed in 1931, replacing a ferry crossing.
