= Goolwa South =

Goolwa South South Australia
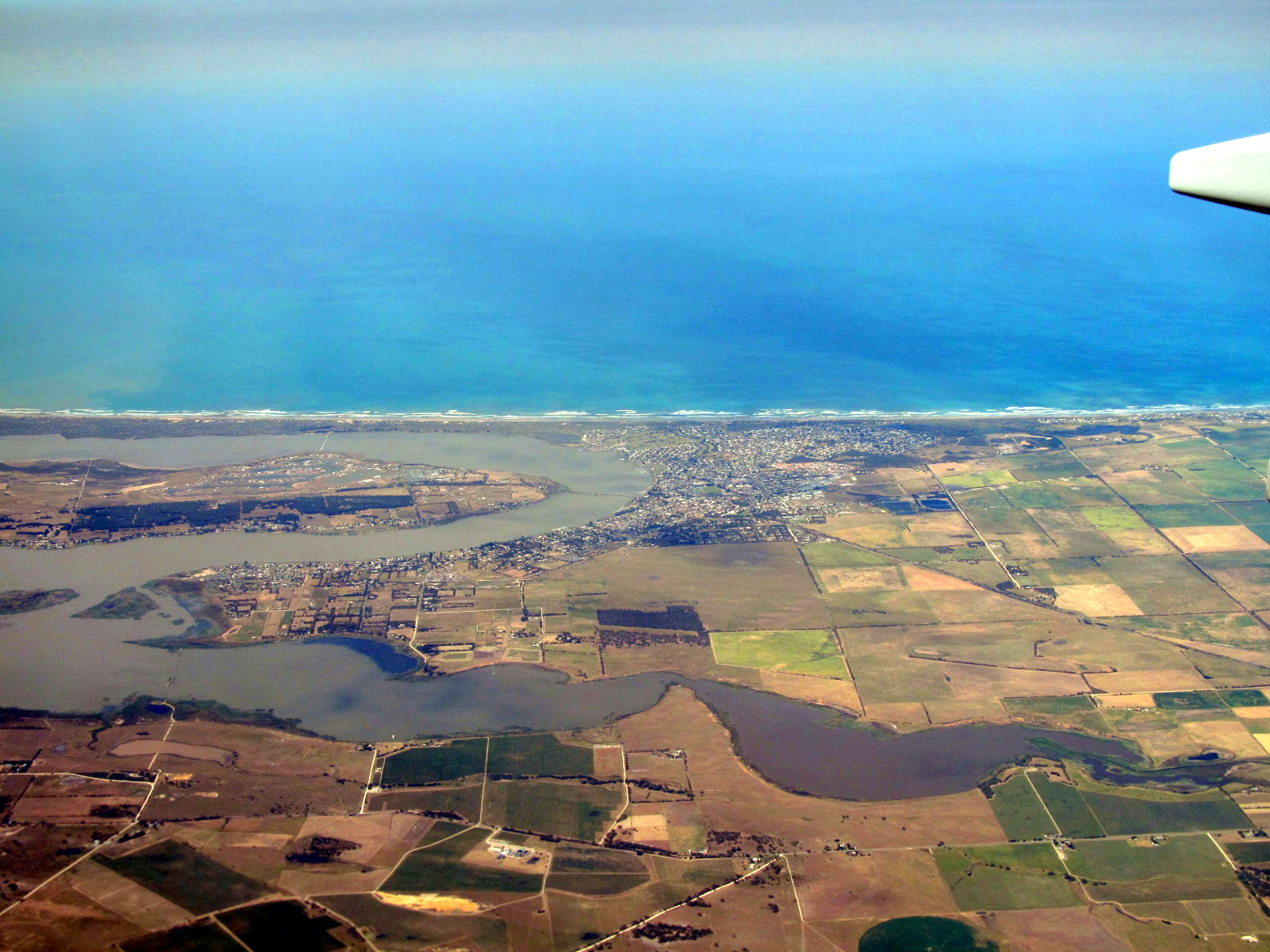
- Goolwa South located on the oceanic coastline between the left-hand side of and the middle of the image.

- Coordinates: 35.512270°S 138.779410°E
- Population: 971 (2016 census)
- Established: 1925
- Postcode(s): 5214
- Time zone: ACST (UTC+9:30)
  - Summer (DST): ACST (UTC+10:30)
- Location: 67 km (42 mi) south of Adelaide
- LGA(s): Alexandrina Council
- Region: Fleurieu and Kangaroo Island
- County: Hindmarsh
- State electorate(s): Finniss
- Federal division(s): Mayo
Mean max temp	Mean min temp	Annual rainfall
20.8 °C; 69 °F	11.8 °C; 53 °F	383.2 mm 15.1 in
Suburbs around Goolwa South:
Goolwa Beach	Goolwa; Hindmarsh Island	Coorong
Goolwa Beach	Goolwa South	Coorong
Encounter Bay	Encounter Bay	Encounter Bay
- Footnotes: Coordinates; Locations; Climate; Adjoining localities

Goolwa South (previously known as South Goolwa) is a locality in the Australian state of South Australia located about 67 kilometres (42 miles) south of the state capital of Adelaide on both on the southern continental coastline and the south-western coast of Lake Alexandrina. It occupies the full extent of the Sir Richard Peninsula, land to the immediate west and part of the Goolwa Channel in the lake system to its north.

The name was first used in respect to a private sub-division of land within the cadastral unit of the Hundred of Goolwa in 1925. Boundaries were created for the “long established name” in 1993 and were again adjusted in August 2000 to include the Sir Richard Peninsula in the adjoining Hundred of Nangkita.

The western end of the locality is occupied by an urban area which extends into the adjoining localities of Goolwa and Goolwa Beach while the remainder of the locality is zoned for conservation and includes part of the Coorong National Park.

Goolwa South is located within the federal division of Mayo, the state electoral district of Finniss and the local government area of the Alexandrina Council.

== See also ==
- Goolwa Barrages
