= Wudinna Airport =

- IATA: WUD; ICAO: YWUD

Summary
- Airport type: Public
- Owner/Operator: Wudinna District Council
- Location: Wudinna, South Australia
- Elevation AMSL: 310 ft / 94 m
- Coordinates: 33°02′36″S 135°26′48″E

Map
- Location in South Australia

Runways
Direction	Length		Surface
Direction	m	ft	Surface
14/32	1,510	4,954	Asphalt
07/25	939	3,081	Gravel
- Sources: Australian AIP and aerodrome chart

Wudinna Airport (IATA: WUD, ICAO: YWUD) is located 0.5 nautical miles (0.93 km; 0.58 mi) west of Wudinna, South Australia.

== See also ==
- List of airports in South Australia
