= William Creek Airport =

- IATA: none; ICAO: YWMC

Summary
- Airport type: Private
- Operator: Trevor Wright (Wrightair)
- Location: William Creek, South Australia
- Elevation AMSL: 300 ft / 91 m
- Coordinates: 28°54′19″S 136°20′32″E

Map
- Location in South Australia

Runways
Direction	Length		Surface
Direction	m	ft	Surface
11/29	1,200	3,937	Asphalt
- Sources: Australian AIP

William Creek Airport (ICAO: YWMC) is an airport in William Creek, South Australia.

== See also ==
- List of airports in South Australia
