= Streaky Bay Airport =

Airport in South Australia

- IATA: KBY; ICAO: YKBY

Summary
- Airport type: Public
- Operator: District Council of Streaky Bay
- Location: Streaky Bay, South Australia, Australia
- Elevation AMSL: 69 ft / 21 m
- Coordinates: 32°50′11.6″S 134°17′34.1″E

Map
- Location in South Australia

Runways
Direction	Length		Surface
Direction	m	ft	Surface
13/31	1,351	4,432	Asphalt
05/23	780	2,559	Gravel
- Sources: AIP

Streaky Bay Airport (IATA: KBY, ICAO: YKBY) is an airport located 4.8 nautical miles (8.9 km; 5.5 mi) southeast of Streaky Bay, a town in the state of South Australia in Australia.

== Facilities ==
The airport resides at an elevation of 69 ft (21 m) above sea level. It has two runways: 13/31 has an asphalt surface measuring 1,351 m × 18 m (4,432 ft × 59 ft) and 05/23 has a gravel surface measuring 780 m × 18 m (2,559 ft × 59 ft).

== See also ==
- List of airports in South Australia
