= Golden Grove mine =

Mine in Western Australia

- Location in Western Australia
- Interactive map of Golden Grove mine
- Location: Yalgoo, Western Australia, Australia; 28°44′41″S 116°56′38″E
- Products: Copper concentrate Zinc concentrate
- Production: Copper: 18,100 tonnes Gold: 14,000 ounces Lead: 1,170 tonnes Silver: 775,000 ounces Zinc: 51,500 tonnes
- Financial year: 2023
- Discovered: 1971
- Opened: 1990
- Company: 29Metals Limited
- Website: www.29metals.com/assets/golden-grove
- Acquired: 2021

The Golden Grove mine is a copper, lead, silver, zinc and gold mine located 52 km south-southeast of Yalgoo, Western Australia. It is operated by 29Metals Limited after a 2021 divestment by EMR Capital.

== History ==
The mine was originally owned by Australian Consolidated Minerals Pty Ltd before passing into the ownership of Normandy Poseidon Ltd in November 1991. Normandy, now renamed Normandy Mining Ltd, was acquired by Newmont Australia Ltd in February 2002.

Newmont passed on the mine to Oxiana Limited in June 2005 for A$265 million and Oxiana merged with Zinifex to form OZ Minerals in mid-2008. OZ Minerals had to sell Golden Grove in June 2009 to China Minmetals, like almost all its other mines, when the company was hit by severe financial difficulties.

Golden Grove currently consists of two operations that are 3 km apart, the Gossan Hill underground mine and the Scuddles underground mine, which both produce zinc, copper, lead, silver and gold. The Gossan Hill deposit was discovered in 1971, and the Scuddles deposit was discovered in 1979.

In 2008, the mine's revenue was A$266.2 million and had a segment operating result of A$72.1 million.

In June 2009, OZ Minerals announced that a trunnion bearing failure on its mill at Golden Grove had put the mill out of service for almost a month, shortly before the approval of the sale of the mine, but operations resumed in July 2009.

It was purchased by EMR Capital, a specialist resources private equity manager, who purchased the mine from MMG in February 2017. Minerals and Metals Group was formed after its parent company China Minmetals bought the mine from OZ Minerals in June 2009. Golden Grove was part of a deal in which the Sepon, Century, Rosebery and Avebury Mines, the Dugald River, High Lake, and Izok Lake Projects, as well as some exploration assets were sold for US$1.354 billion by OZ Minerals to China Minmetals.

The deal, initially including the Prominent Hill Mine, was blocked by the Australian Government, citing national security concerns. Wayne Swan, Treasurer of Australia, stated that Prominent Hill could not be included in the sale as it was within sensitive military area and the sale went only ahead after Prominent Hill was excluded.

EMR Capital purchased the mine in 2017 for US$210 million after MMG had been looking for a buyer since 2016. EMR Capital had been founded by Owen Hegarty, who had led Oxiana when it acquired Golden Grove from Newmont in 2005.

In June 2021, EMR Capital divested itself of Golden Grove and other assets, launching the Australian Securities Exchange-listed 29Metals Limited as the new owner of the mine.

== Production ==
Production figures for the mine:^{1}

| Year | Copper | Gold | Lead | Silver | Zinc |
|---|---|---|---|---|---|
| 2001 | 22,249 t | 5,356 oz | 4,937 t | 975,146 oz | 77,569 t |
| 2002 | 19,500 t | 10,300 oz | 4,937 t | 899,500 oz | 34,571 t |
| 2003 | | | | | |
| 2004 | | | | | |
| 2005 | 21,808 t | 25,272 oz | 4,949 t | 2,174,620 oz | 70,508 t |
| 2006 | 10,811 t | 49,354 oz | 11,458 t | 3,005,611 oz | 138,817 t |
| 2007 | 15,404 t | 48,807 oz | 8,119 t | 3,165,408 oz | 131,954 t |
| 2008 | 18,467 t | 47,755 oz | 13,300 t | 3,157,837 oz | 139,900 t |
| 2009 | | | | | |
| 2010 | | | | | |
| 2011 | | | | | |
| 2012 | | | | | |
| 2013 | | | | | |
| 2014 | | | | | |
| 2015 | | | | | |
| 2016 | | | | | |
| 2017 | | | | | |
| 2018 | | | | | |
| 2019 | | | | | |
| 2020 | | | | | |
| 2021 | 16,015 t | 35,850 oz | 2,448 t | 1,496,339 oz | 47,756 t |
| 2022 | 16,938 t | 26,574 oz | 2,764 t | 1,321,000 oz | 57,575 t |
| 2023 | 18,100 t | 14,000 oz | 1,170 t | 775,000 oz | 51,500 t |

- ^{1} January to September 2002 only.
