= Hallstatt =

Town in Gmunden, Upper Austria

- Municipality
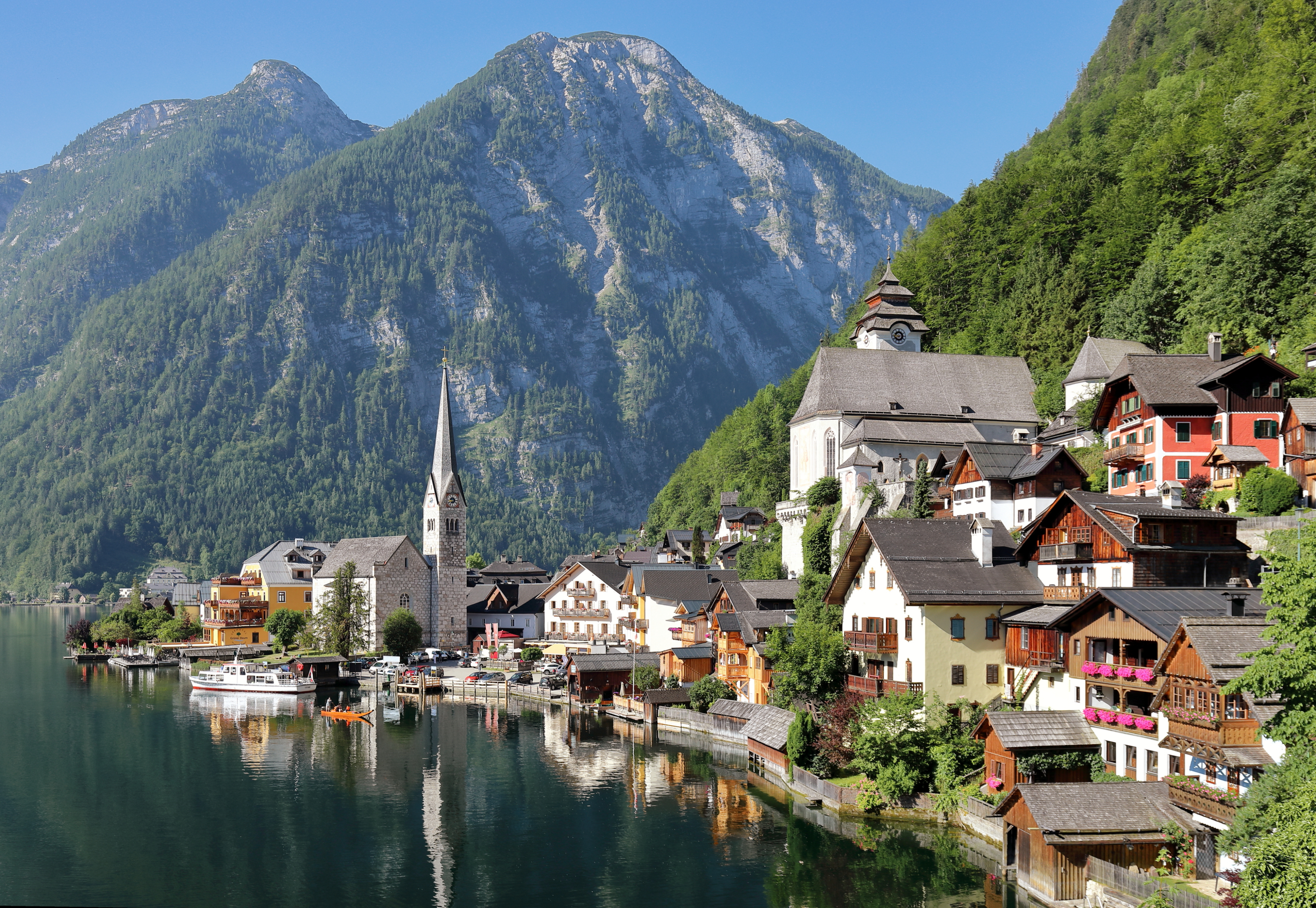
- The centre of Hallstatt

- Coat of arms

- Location within Austria
- Coordinates: 47.562°N 13.649°E
- Country: Austria
- State: Upper Austria
- District: Gmunden

Government
  - Mayor: Alexander Scheutz (SPÖ)

Area
  - Total: 59.83 km^{2} (23.10 sq mi)
- Elevation: 511 m (1,677 ft)

Population (2026-01-01)
  - Total: 741
  - Density: 12.4/km^{2} (32.1/sq mi)
- Time zone: UTC+1 (CET)
  - Summer (DST): UTC+2 (CEST)
- Postal code: 4830
- Area code: 06134
- Vehicle registration: GM
- Website: www.hallstatt.at

Hallstatt (German: [ˈhalʃtat]) is a small town in the Gmunden District of the Austrian state of Upper Austria. Situated between the southwestern shore of Hallstätter See and the steep slopes of the Dachstein massif, the town lies in the Salzkammergut region, on the national road linking Salzburg and Graz.

Hallstatt is known for its production of salt, dating back to prehistoric times, and gave its name to the Hallstatt culture, the archaeological culture linked to Proto-Celtic and early Celtic people of the Early Iron Age in Europe, c. 800–450 BC.

Hallstatt is at the core of the Hallstatt-Dachstein/Salzkammergut Cultural Landscape declared as one of the World Heritage Sites in Austria by UNESCO in 1997. It is an area of overtourism.

== History ==
Hallstatt
UNESCO World Heritage Site
- Interactive map of Hallstatt
- Part of: Hallstatt-Dachstein / Salzkammergut Cultural Landscape
- Criteria: Cultural: iii, iv
- Reference: 806
- Inscription: 1997 (21st Session)
- Area: 28,446.2 ha (70,292 acres)
- Buffer zone: 20,013.9 ha (49,455 acres)

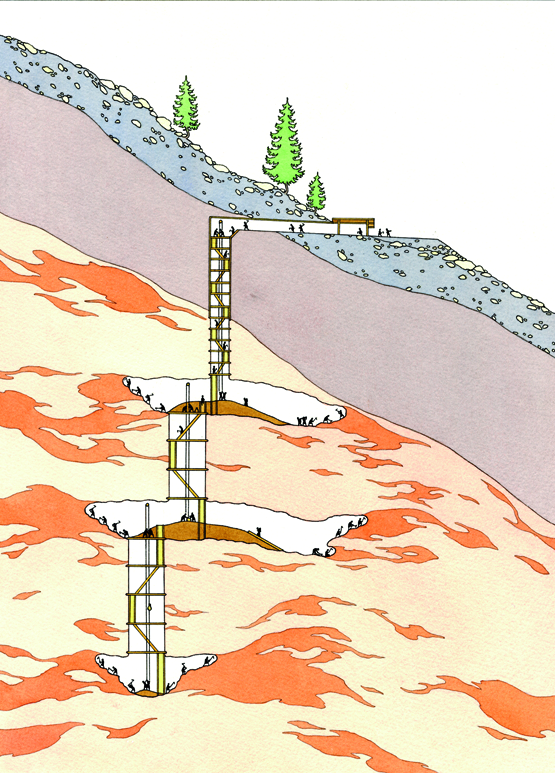
A section of the Iron Age Hallstatt salt workings

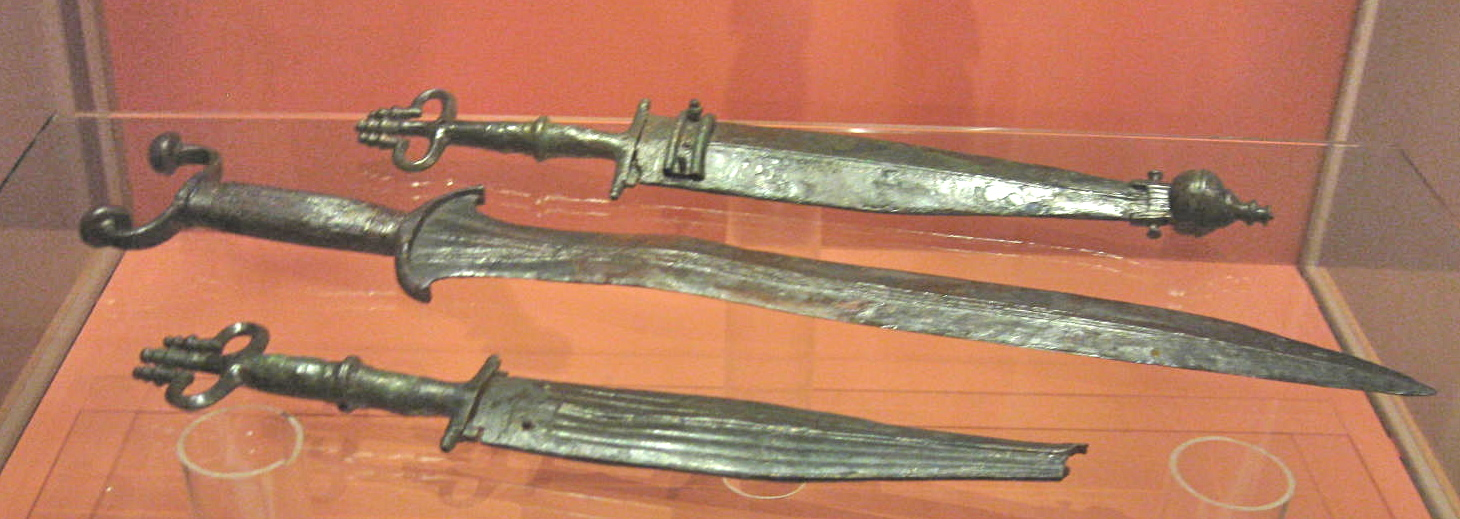
"Antenna hilt" Hallstatt 'D' swords, from Hallstatt

During the Bronze Age salt production became day-to-day commercial activity in Hallstatt. Salt was produced in large quantities in evidently highly organized arrangements. Specialist workers supported the salt mining operations. The wealth that was generated is on display in the prehistoric cemeteries in Hallstatt.

In 1846 Johann Georg Ramsauer discovered a large prehistoric cemetery at the Salzberg mines near Hallstatt (47.561°N 13.642°E), which he excavated during the second half of the 19th century. Eventually the excavation would yield 1,045 burials, although no settlement has yet been found. This may be covered by the later village, which has long occupied the entire narrow strip between the steep hillsides and the lake.

Some 1,300 burials have been found, including around 2,000 individuals, with women and children but few infants.

The humans that settled Hallstatt exploited the salt mines in the area from the 8th to 5th centuries BC. The style and decoration of the grave goods found in the cemetery are distinctive. In the mine workings themselves, the salt has preserved many organic materials such as textiles, wood, and leather, and many abandoned artefacts such as shoes, pieces of cloth, and tools and miner's backpacks have survived in good condition.

Hallstatt A–B are part of the Bronze Age Urnfield culture. Phase A saw Villanovan influence. In this period, people were cremated and buried in simple graves. In phase B, tumulus (barrow or kurgan) burial becomes common, and cremation predominates. Little is known about this period in which the typical Celtic elements have not yet distinguished themselves from the earlier Villanova-culture. The "Hallstatt period" proper is restricted to HaC and HaD (8th to 5th centuries BC), corresponding to the early European Iron Age. Hallstatt lies in the area where the western and eastern zones of the Hallstatt culture meet, which is reflected in the finds from there.

Hallstatt C is characterized by the first appearance of iron swords. Hallstatt D displays daggers, almost to the exclusion of swords, in the western zone graves ranging from circa 600 to 500 BC. There are also differences in the pottery and brooches. Halstatt D has been further divided into the sub-phases D1 to D3 relating only to the western zone.

Major activity at the site appears to have finished about 500 BC, for reasons that are unclear. Many Hallstatt graves were robbed, probably at this time. There was widespread disruption throughout the western Hallstatt zone, and the salt workings had by then become very deep.

Much of the material from early excavations was dispersed.

Finds from the Hallstatt site

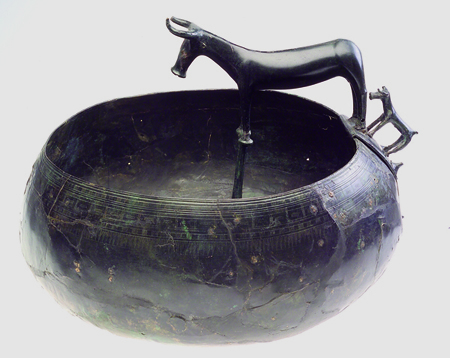
A bronze vessel with cow and calf, Hallstatt

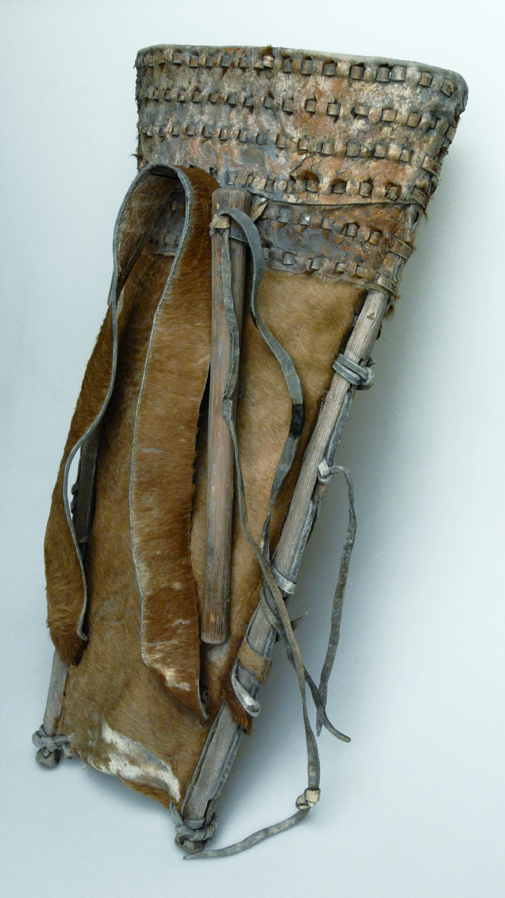
A wood and leather carrying pack from the mine

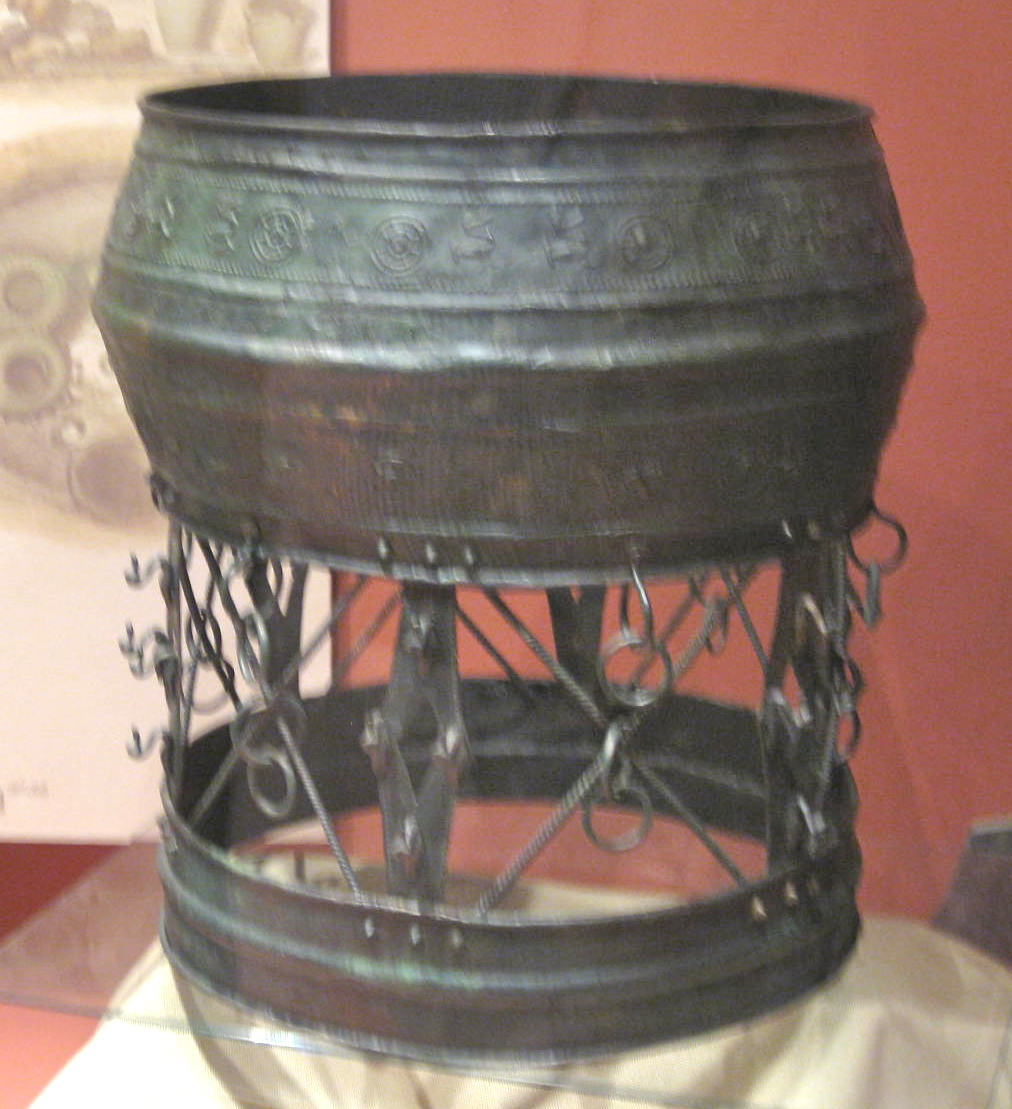
A bronze container with stand, Hallstatt Ha C

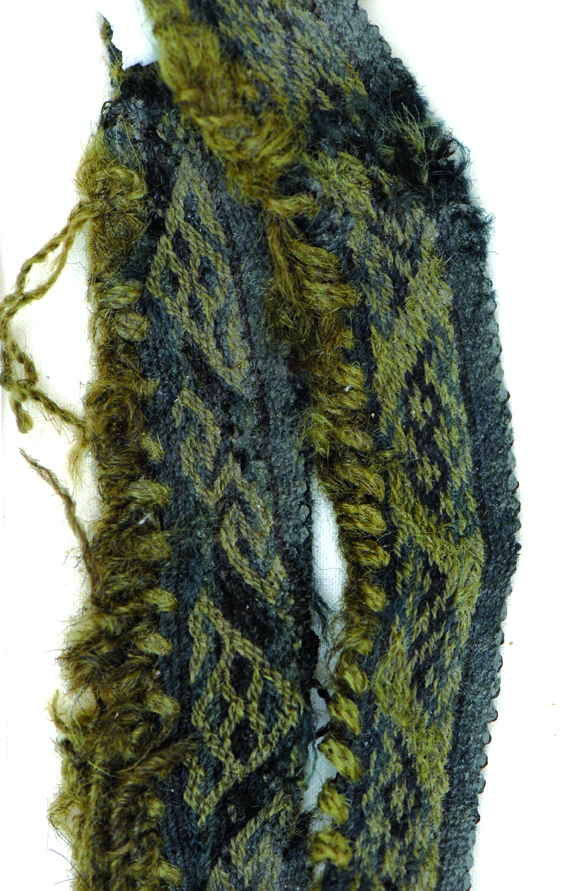
A textile fragment from the salt mine

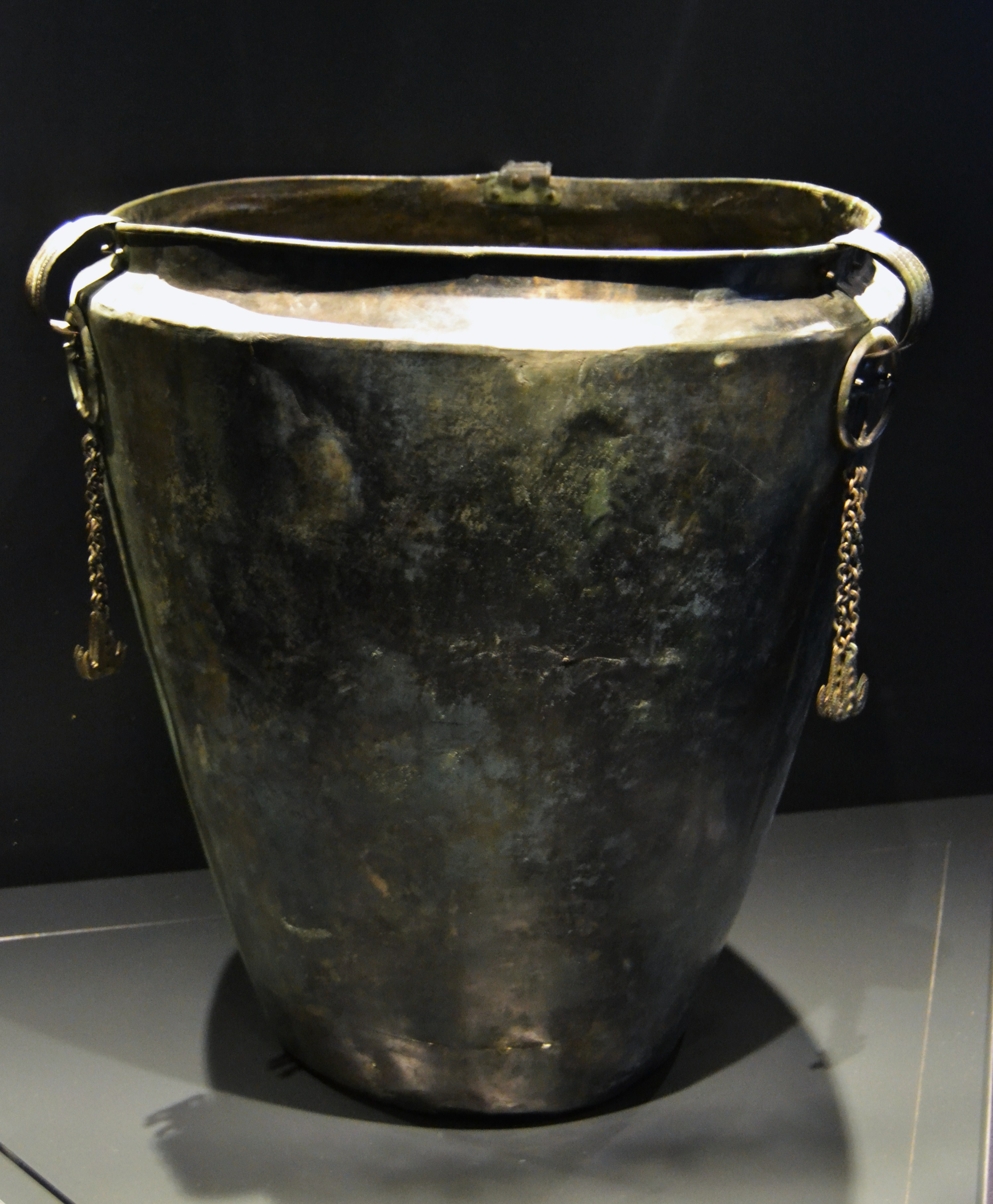
Bronze situla, 800-750 BC

=== Romans onwards ===
Tourists are told that Hallstatt is the site of "the world's oldest pipeline", which was constructed 400 years ago from 13,000 hollowed-out trees. There is so little space for cemeteries that every ten years bones used to be exhumed and removed into an ossuary, to make room for new burials. A collection of elaborately decorated skulls with the deceased's name, profession, and date of death inscribed on them is on display at the local chapel.

=== 19th century ===
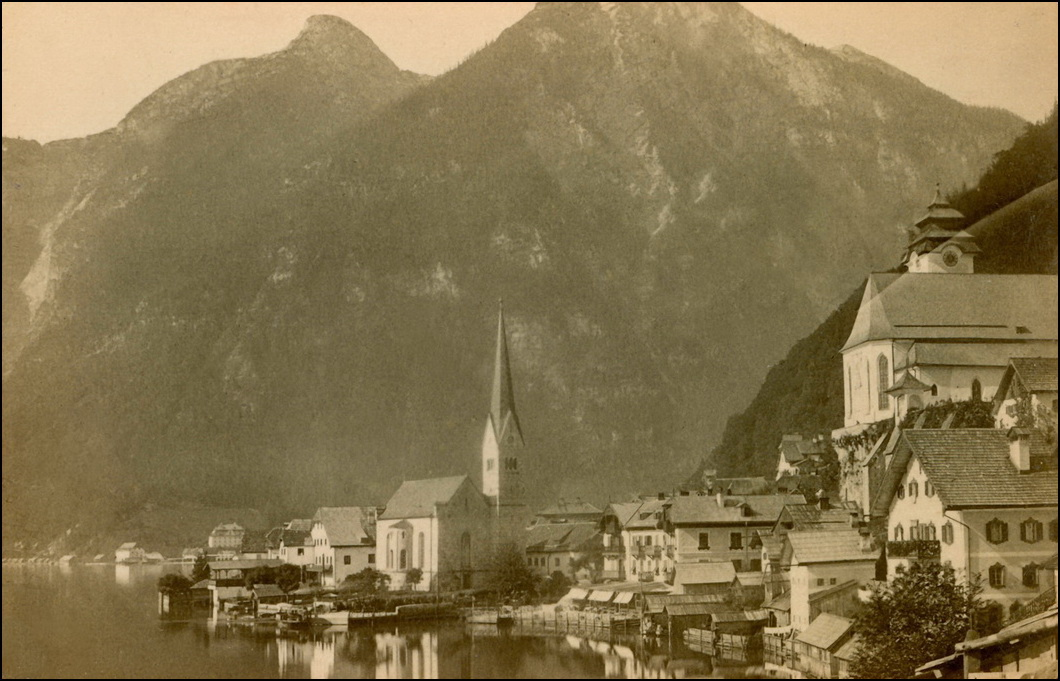
A view of Hallstatt in 1899

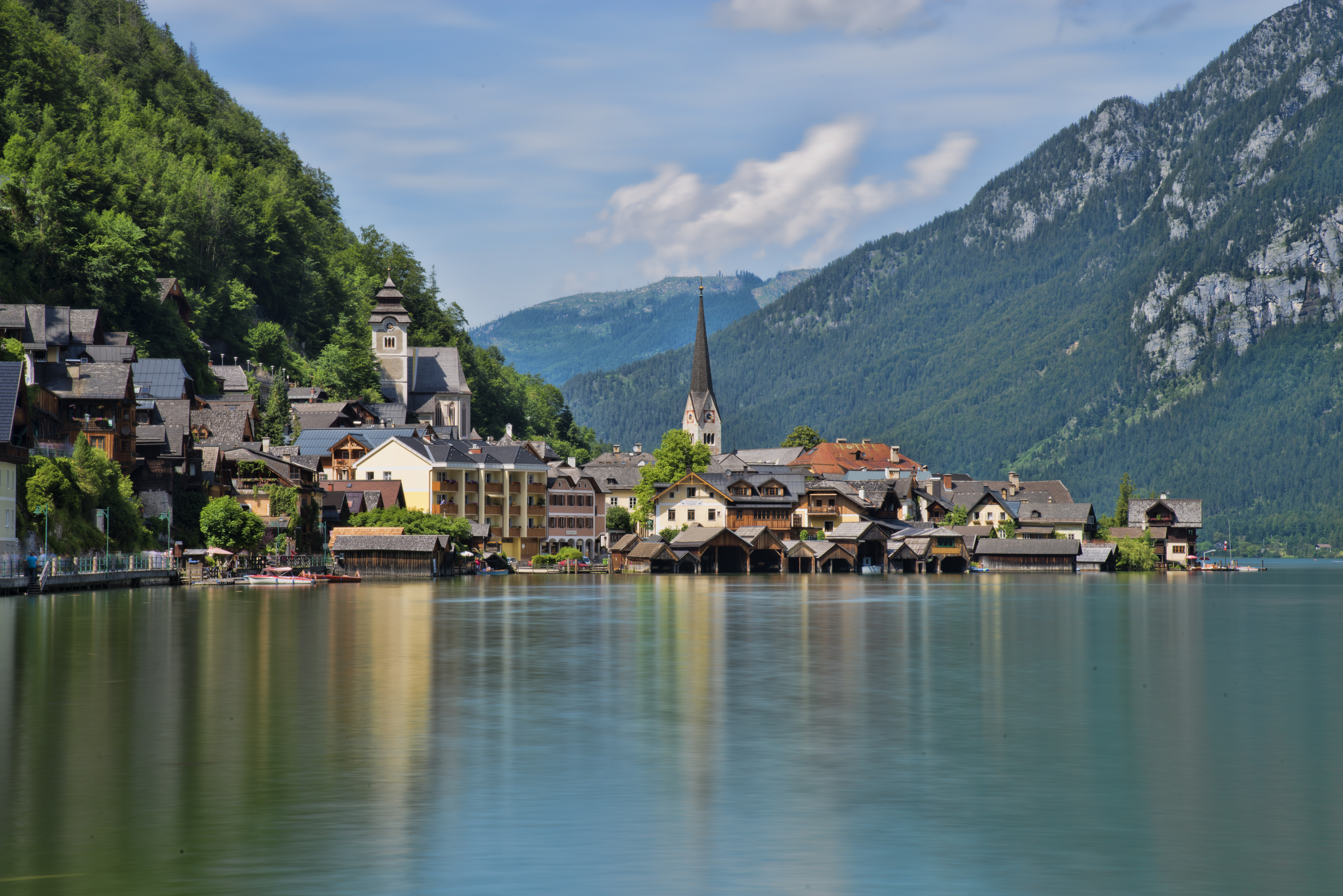
Hallstatt viewed from the south, Hallstatt Museum

Until the late 19th century, it was only possible to reach Hallstatt by boat or via narrow trails. The land between the lake and mountains was sparse, and the town itself exhausted every free patch of it. Access between houses on the river bank was by boat or over the upper path, a small corridor passing through attics. The first road to Hallstatt was only built in 1890, along the west shore, partially by rock blasting. Nevertheless, this secluded and inhospitable landscape counts as one of the first places of human settlement due to the rich sources of natural salt, which have been mined for thousands of years, originally in the shape of hearts owing to the use of antler picks.

=== Archaeology ===
In 2025, archaeologists announced the discovery of a Roman-era cameo depicting Medusa during excavations associated with construction work at a new funicular railway station. The cameo, carved from black-and-white banded agate or onyx and dated to the 2nd century AD, was likely crafted in the Adriatic city of Aquileia and is notable for its workmanship and preservation. It is considered among the few larger Roman cameos on public display in Upper Austria.

== Hallstatt salt mine ==
The Hallstatt salt mine is the world's oldest working salt mine. The mine is located within the Upper Permian to Lower Triassic Haselgebirge Formation of the Northern Limestone Alps. The Hallstatt salt mine comprises 21 levels and several smaller shafts ranging from 514 metres (1,686 ft) above sea level (Erbstollen level) to an elevation of around 1,267 m (4,157 ft) (Erzherzog Matthias Schurf level).

== Tourism ==
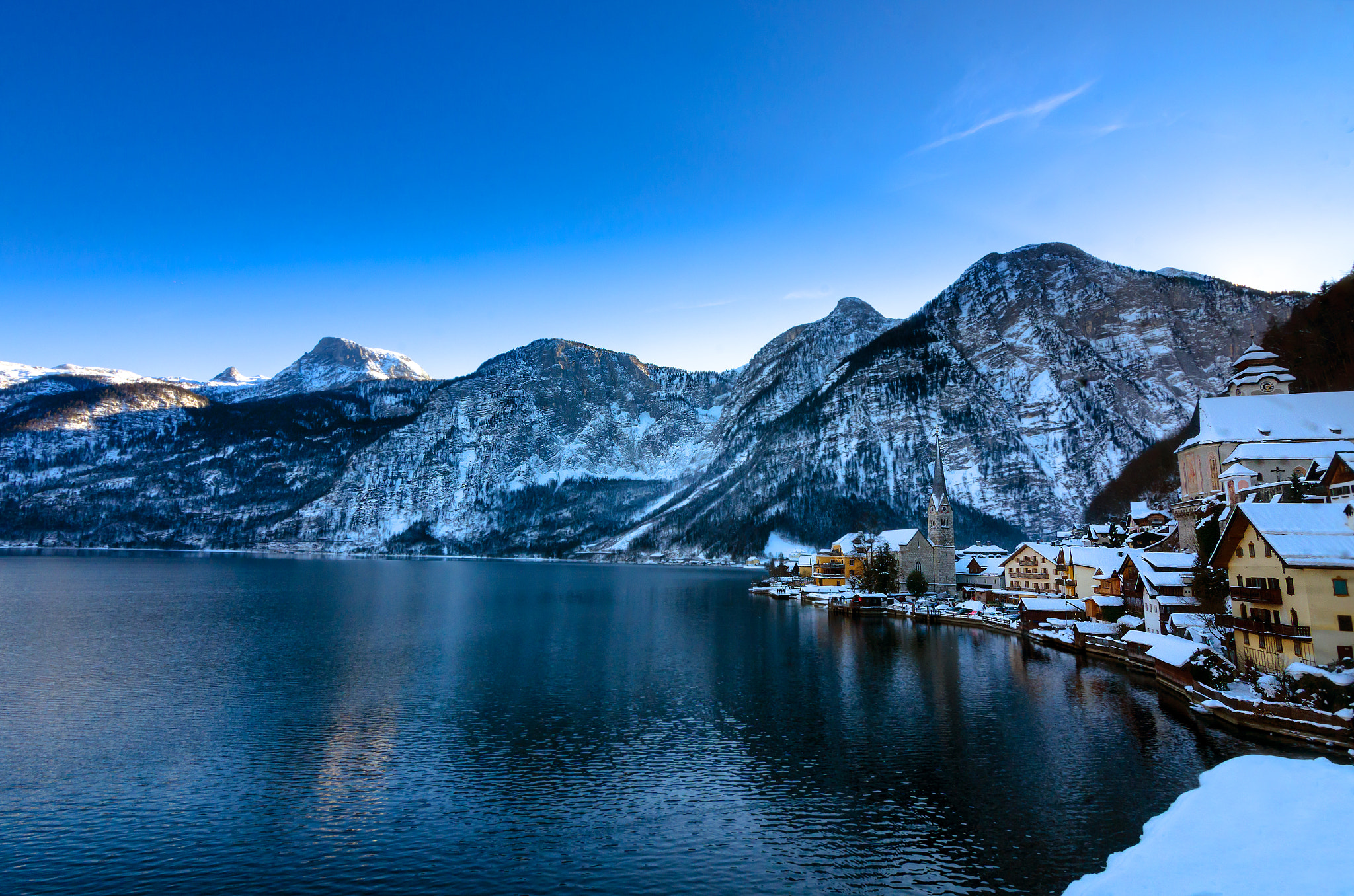
Hallstatt in Winter

Hallstatt's tourism began in the 19th century but greatly increased after it was named a UNESCO World Heritage Site in 1997. It became popular among East Asian tourists in 2006 when it was featured on a South Korean television show.

Social media images of Hallstatt, captioned "the most Instagrammable town in the world", went viral in Eastern and Southeastern Asia. In 2013, it was rumored in China to be the model for the movie Frozen's Arendelle village. Filmmakers have said the village was based on research done in Norway and Canada, not in Austria, but the rumors increased daytourist visits.

=== Notable places ===
Hallstatt has several tourist sites. These include:

Hallstatt Skywalk: Hallstatt Skywalk, also known as the "World Heritage View", offers a panorama of the UNESCO World Heritage Site. Located 360 meters above Hallstatt, the platform overlooks the village, Lake Hallstatt and the surrounding Dachstein Alps.

Hallstatt Ossuary (Beinhaus): Located in St. Michael's Chapel, the Ossuary is a cultural monument comprising more than 1,200 human skulls, 600 of which are artistically painted with symbols, names and dates. The tradition of painting skulls and preserving bones began due to limited burial space in the village.

Hallstatt Museum and Excavations: The Hallstatt Museum covers the ancient history of the region, especially its role in the salt trade. It features artifacts from the Hallstatt culture, dating back to the Bronze and Iron Ages, including tools, weapons and burial objects. The museum also covers the archaeological excavations in the nearby area that reveal the complex society of the Hallstatt civilization.

=== Overtourism by day visitors ===
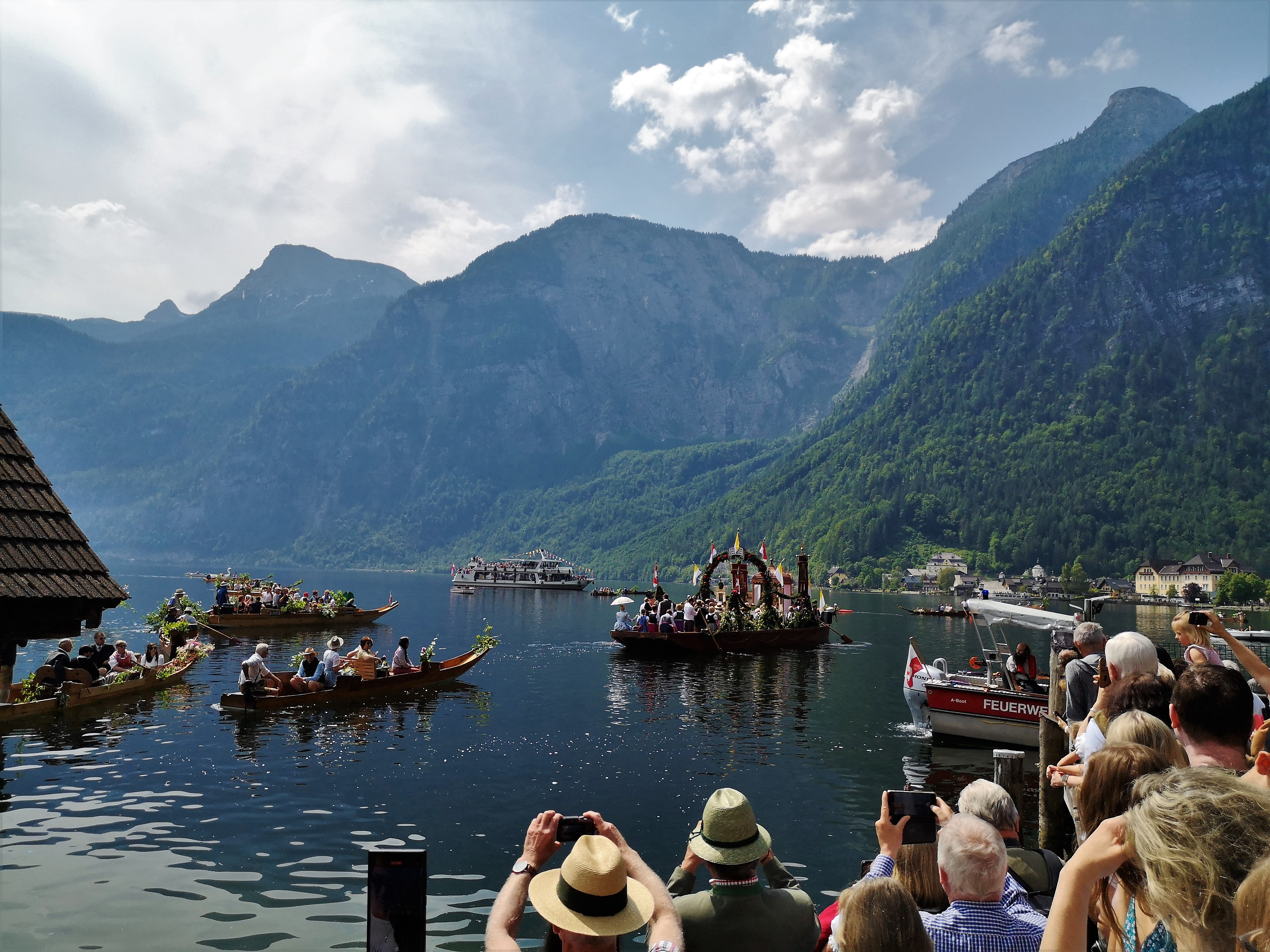
Corpus Christi procession in Hallstatt, 2023

The problems and opportunities of greatly-increased tourism in Hallstatt were covered by The Washington Post in August 2019.

By 2017, local churches were employing bouncers to prevent services being disrupted by tourists. In 2020, the town had a population of 780, and estimates of 10,000 to nearly 30,000 tourists per day, primarily via bus tours which bring tourists briefly into the town for photo opportunities, then quickly move on.

Tourism is important to Hallstatt's economy, but according to locals the day-visitors drive away tourists who would stay longer. Hallstatt became the prime example of overtourism in Austria and led to controversies around limiting the number of tourists. The Austrian Public Broadcasting Organization made multiple documentaries about the situation.

In 2020, the town focused on "quality" tourism. Starting in autumn 2020 there were assigned time slots for tour buses to cope with the problem. Arrivals were limited to 54 per day, about half of the previous number allowed. Buses with an overnight booking in the town received preference.

In 2023 locals protested against overtourism. In May, two fences were built to prevent tourists from stopping to take selfies; they were removed after "a backlash" on social media. In August, protesters blocked the entrance to a tunnel through which buses pass to enter the town. The mayor announced plans to reduce the number of buses allowed by another one-third.

== Politics ==
Seats in the municipal assembly (Gemeinderat) as of 2021 local elections:

- Social Democratic Party of Austria (SPÖ): 7
- BFH (Independent): 4
- Austrian People's Party (ÖVP): 2

Alexander Scheutz (SPÖ) has been mayor of Hallstatt since 2009.

== International relations ==
=== Twin town ===
Hallstatt is twinned with:

- Huizhou, China

=== Replica ===
On 16 June 2011, plans to build a replica in China were first reported. On 2 June 2012, it was reported that Chinese mining company China Minmetals Corporation built a full-scale replica of the entire town in Huizhou, Guangdong province.

In 2022, the Chinese Hallstatt replica was the final location of the 12th episode of the first season of the Korean television series Money Heist: Korea – Joint Economic Area. In the episode, it was called "Kherson", after the town in Ukraine.

== Climate ==
Hallstatt, like much of Austria (see Climate of Austria), has a humid continental climate (Dfb) (Cfb if the −3.0 °C (26.6 °F) isotherm is used) with warm, rainy summers and chilly to cold, snowy winters. Precipitation is plentiful year-round, hence the f in Dfb, but is at its highest during the three months of summer (June through August).

Spring is a short (March and April) transition season between cold winters and mild summers. By mid-November, fall has turned to winter and the nighttime low temperature is around freezing, giving a growing season of April to early November.

Climate data for Hallstatt
Month	Jan	Feb	Mar	Apr	May	Jun	Jul	Aug	Sep	Oct	Nov	Dec	Year
Mean daily maximum °C (°F)	1.5 (34.7)	4.0 (39.2)	9.2 (48.6)	13.9 (57.0)	19.0 (66.2)	22.3 (72.1)	24.1 (75.4)	23.3 (73.9)	19.7 (67.5)	13.8 (56.8)	6.7 (44.1)	2.3 (36.1)	13.3 (56.0)
Daily mean °C (°F)	−2.6 (27.3)	−0.7 (30.7)	3.7 (38.7)	8.0 (46.4)	12.9 (55.2)	16.2 (61.2)	17.8 (64.0)	17.2 (63.0)	13.7 (56.7)	8.6 (47.5)	3.1 (37.6)	−1.0 (30.2)	8.1 (46.5)
Mean daily minimum °C (°F)	−6.5 (20.3)	−5.4 (22.3)	−1.7 (28.9)	2.2 (36.0)	6.8 (44.2)	10.2 (50.4)	11.6 (52.9)	11.1 (52.0)	7.8 (46.0)	3.4 (38.1)	−0.5 (31.1)	−4.3 (24.3)	2.9 (37.2)
Average precipitation mm (inches)	86 (3.4)	86 (3.4)	89 (3.5)	110 (4.3)	125 (4.9)	172 (6.8)	177 (7.0)	153 (6.0)	104 (4.1)	91 (3.6)	96 (3.8)	104 (4.1)	1,393 (54.9)

== See also ==
- Instagram tourism
- List of World Heritage Sites in Austria
