= Prominent Hill Airport =

- IATA: PXH; ICAO: YPMH

Summary
- Airport type: Private
- Owner/Operator: Oz Minerals
- Location: Prominent Hill Mine
- Elevation AMSL: 734 ft / 224 m
- Coordinates: 29°43′00″S 135°31′18″E

Map
- Location in South Australia

Runways
Direction	Length		Surface
Direction	m	ft	Surface
18/36	1,800	5,906	Bitumen
- Sources: AIP

Prominent Hill Airport (IATA: PXH, ICAO: YPMH) is a private airport servicing the Oz Minerals Prominent Hill Mine in north west South Australia, 130 km (81 mi) south-east of Coober Pedy.

== Airlines and destinations ==
Airlines	Destinations
Alliance Airlines	Charter:^{1} Adelaide
National Jet Express	Charter:^{1} Adelaide, Port Augusta
Sharp Airlines	Charter:^{1} Adelaide

Notes
^1 Fly-in fly-out (FIFO) private charter operations only.
