= Carrapateena mine =

Mine in Australia

- Location within Australia Location within South Australia
- Location: South Australia, Australia; 31°14′54″S 137°29′14″E 31°14'54.0"S 137°29'13.5"E
- Products: Copper
- Website: www.ozminerals.com/operations/carrapateena-project/

The Carrapateena mine is a large copper mine under development in South Australia's Far North region 100 km southeast of Olympic Dam and approximately 160 km north of Port Augusta. Carrapateena represents one of the largest copper reserves in Australia and in the world having estimated reserves of 292 million tonnes of ore grading 1.31% copper and 3.64 million oz of gold. It was discovered by explorer and metallurgist Rudie Gomez in 2005. The project was acquired by Oz Minerals in 2011, and the project was referred to the EPBC Act for Federal environmental approval in 2012. Construction of the decline to access the mine commenced in 2016. The mining technique used to extract the ore is sub-level caving.

The Tjati decline was officially opened in November 2016. The company expected that it would take two years to complete excavation of the decline which is 7.5 km (4.7 mi) long and descends 600 m (2,000 ft). The mine owners also have a signed agreement with the traditional owners of the land, the Kokatha people. The company announced board approval for continued development on 24 August 2017, expecting to spend A$916 million on development before the mine would begin to produce ore in late 2019. The first copper concentrate was produced in December 2019, by which time the mine had cost between $950 million and $980 million.

Mine life is forecast to be about 20 years. During the construction time for the decline, surface construction continued. This included an accommodation village and airstrip in 2017–2018. They were followed by processing plant, access road and electricity infrastructure from mid-2018 and installation of underground materials handling. The mine site is on Pernatty Station with other infrastructure on Oakden Hills Station.

Construction of the airstrip was completed in July 2018 by NRW Holdings with the village providing 550 accommodation rooms completed about a month later. National Jet Express provides fly-in fly-out services between Adelaide, Port Augusta and Carrapateena since October 2018 using an RJ-100 aircraft. It operates 14 flights per week on the route.

The Program for Environment Protection and Rehabilitation (PEPR) for the mine was approved by the state government on 29 March 2018. Downer was then awarded the contract to take over from PYBAR Mining Services to continue underground mining operations from 1 July 2018. Downer is also a joint venture partner in the engineering, procurement and construction of above ground facilities.
