= Owen Hegarty =

Australian mining professional

Owen Hegarty OAM HonFAusIMM

Personal details
- Born: Owen Leigh Hegarty
- Occupation: Mining engineer

Owen Leigh Hegarty is an Australian mining professional with over forty years experience in the industry. Hegarty worked with Rio Tinto for 24 years, where he held positions of Managing Director Asia and Managing Director of the group's copper and gold business. He founded Oxiana Limited which grew from a small exploration company into a multi-billion dollar base and precious metals producer, developer and explorer. Oxiana merged with Zinifex to form Oz Minerals in 2008. Hegarty's commentary on the resources sector has been published in various news media including The Age, The Australian, Australian Financial Review, Jakarta Post, South China Morning Post, Wall Street Journal and other industry-specific publications.

== Australian interests ==
Hegarty is a non-executive director of Fortescue and a Director of the Australasian Institute of Mining & Metallurgy. He is Chair of Tigers Realm Minerals and a non-executive director of Tigers Realm Coal and Highfield Resources. He is also the chair of Melbourne-based EMR Capital and is a member of the South Australian Minerals & Petroleum Expert Group which advises the Government of South Australia's Department of State Development. He is also a director of the Mining Hall of Fame Foundation.

== Hong Kong interests ==
Hegarty is Executive Vice Chairman of Hong Kong listed mining companies G-Resources Group (gold) and Executive Vice Chairman of CST Mining Group (copper).

== Political views ==
Hegarty has expressed his support for his business associate Andrew Forrest's controversial 'Forrest Review' and believes in its potential to improve opportunities for indigenous Australians.

== Honours ==
Hegarty was awarded the Australasian Institute of Mining & Metallurgy Institute Medal in 2006 and an honorary fellowship in 2019 as well as the G. J. Stokes Memorial Award in 2008. In the 2021 Queen's Birthday Honours he was awarded the Medal of the Order of Australia for "service to the minerals and mining sector".
