= Charles Mayrs =

Canadian artist and writer

Charles Mayrs (born Charles Alexander Mayrs, April 18, 1940, in Winnipeg, Manitoba) is a Canadian artist and writer whose career has spanned more than 50 years in advertising, the arts and limited edition book design, writing and publishing based in Vancouver, British Columbia.

== Early life ==
Mayrs the son of Irish immigrants from Coleraine, Northern Ireland. Mayrs's father was an infantry soldier in WW1 with the 43rd battalion of the Canadian Expeditionary Force. The family eventually moved to Vancouver, British Columbia, where Mayrs attended Magee High School and won the Sir Ernest MacMillan Fine Art Scholarship—a prize which enabled him to enroll at the Vancouver School of Art (1957-1961). In 1960, he won the Canadian Student Typography Design Award from the Roland Paper Company in Montreal, Quebec.

== Career ==
After graduating from the Vancouver School of Art in 1961, Mayrs was hired as a graphic artist at James Lovick Limited Advertising Agency. He worked as an art director on various local, provincial and national accounts, including Scott Paper, Nabob Foods, BC Government, Vancouver Sun, BC Telephone and Bridgestone Tires.

In 1970, Mayrs won a National Newspaper Awards for Public Service campaigns from the Toronto Telegram. The Vancouver-owned Lovick agency was sold to Baker Advertising of Toronto in 1970, after which it was sold to Batten, Barton, Durstine & Osborne of New York. During this time, Mayrs became a creative director and vice president of the company.

In 1985, he led the Vancouver Baker Lovick/BBDO creative team in developing and producing the worldwide advertising for Vancouver's World Fair, EXPO 86.

In 1986, Mayrs and his business partner Douglas Heal formed the advertising agency and PR firm, Dome Advertising, where he held the title of President and Creative Director. That same year, he developed the marketing and creative strategy for Gordon Campbell's winning Vancouver mayoralty campaign. Mayrs was Campbell's advertising consultant for the next ten years, ending with the BC Liberal loss to the NDP in 1996. He was also the creative advertising strategist for Philip Owen's three term victories as Mayor of Vancouver. On the corporate side, Mayrs created successful campaigns for clients such as Council Of Forest Industries, MacMillan Bloedel, BC Gas, Tourism Vancouver and Sandwell Engineering for over 11 years, before he and Heal sold Dome to Foote, Cone and Belding of Toronto/Chicago in 1997.

In 1999, Mayrs was hired by the North Shore Outlook newspaper as their political cartoonist. His cartoons – a combination of limericks and drawings of local politicians and community interests – were eventually judged overly controversial, and Mayrs was fired in 2004. His five years of original cartoon artwork was subsequently purchased by Simon Fraser University for their department of Special Collections.

In the early 2000s, Mayrs enjoyed a brief stint in acting, appearing in the television series, Dark Angel, 'Freak Nation' Episode 22, which resulted in a cameo appearance as a vigilante, directed by James Cameron. He also appeared in a 2005 Hasbro commercial for their game Guesstures.

Mayrs has exhibited his work in group, juried and solo shows over the years in locales which include the Vancouver Art Gallery, Seymour Art Gallery, Diane Farris Gallery, Woodworks Gallery and Maui Cultural Center.

Since 2003, Mayrs has focused his considerable creative energies on writing, illustrating and publishing fine press limited-edition letterpress books. They typically find their way into the hands of private collectors, as well as the special collections departments of National Library and Archives Canada, the University of British Columbia, Simon Fraser University, the University of Alberta, the Vancouver and Toronto Public Libraries, and Brown University in Rhode Island.

In 2009, Mayrs's book, British Columbia. In Light and Dark was awarded the Alcuin Society's first prize in Canada for excellence in book design. In the early 2000s, Mayrs introduced the novel concept of BASH poetry, and his first BASH limited-edition book Fix or Die was published in 2006.

Charles Mayrs has been listed in Canada's Who's Who publication since 1988. He resides in West Vancouver, British Columbia.

=== Advertising ===
- Marketing Magazine (Canada)/ October 5, 1970/ Front cover/ "The ad the Tely refused to print"/ by Sheila Pattison
- Marketing Magazine (Canada)/ Dec.12, 1988/ Pages 50, 51/ "The West feels merger aftershocks"/ by Tony Whitney

=== Newspaper Cartooning ===
- North Shore Outlook... Editorial page, Feb. 5, 2004/ Andrew McCredie, editor
- North Shore Outlook... Nov. 4, 2004, Editorial/ "Mr. Glimmericks signs off"/ Page 8
- North Shore Outlook ... Nov.11, 2004, Letters to the editor/ Page 8

=== Painting ===
- North Shore News/ Fri. April 9, 1999/ Page 24/ "Bold strokes evoke the dark side"/ by Layne Christensen
- Preview Gallery Guide magazine/ September–October, 2000/ Woodworks Gallery/ Page 38
- The Times Transcript newspaper/ Moncton New Brunswick/ June 16, 1990/ Page 42/ "Painting family reunited"/ Vancouver (CP)
- Air Canada Enroute magazine/ June, 1991/ Page 13/ "Exposures- Mayrs brothers"/ by Zsuzi Gartner

=== Fine Press Limited Edition Books ===
- Google Library and Archives Canada, enter Charles Mayrs + search
- University of British Columbia, enter Charles Mayrs + search
- Simon Fraser University , click library search, enter Charles Mayrs + search
- University of Alberta, enter Charles Mayrs + search
- Vancouver Public Library, enter Charles Mayrs + search
- Toronto Public Library, enter Charles Mayrs + search
- Brown University, enter Charles Mayrs +find

=== Canadian Who's Who ===
- 1988 Edition/ Volume XXIII/ Page 556/ University of Toronto Press/ Kieran Simpson, editor
- 2010 Edition/ Volume XLV/ Page 860/ University of Toronto Press/ Elizabeth Lumley, editor
