= Carrapateena Airport =

Airport in South Australia

- IATA: none; ICAO: YCPT

Summary
- Airport type: Private
- Operator: Oz Minerals
- Location: Carrapateena mine
- Elevation AMSL: 672 ft / 205 m
- Coordinates: 31°18′30″S 137°26′36″E

Map
- Location in South Australia

Runways
Direction	Length		Surface
Direction	m	ft	Surface
01/19	1,600	5,249	Bitumen
- Sources: AIP

Carrapateena Airport (ICAO: YCPT) is a private airport servicing the Carrapateena mine in northern South Australia, 33.7 nautical miles (62.4 kilometres; 38.8 miles) east of Woomera. Construction of the airport by NRW Holdings was completed in July 2018.

== Airlines and destinations ==
Airlines	Destinations
National Jet Express	Charter:^{1} Adelaide, Port Augusta

Notes
^1 Fly-in fly-out (FIFO) private charter operations only.
