= Weng Zuliang =

Chinese politician

- 翁祖亮

Communist Party Secretary of Pudong New Area
- In office December 2016 – July 2021
- Preceded by: Shen Xiaoming
- Succeeded by: Zhu Zhisong

Personal details
- Born: July 1963 (age 62) Fuqing County, Fujian
- Party: Chinese Communist Party

Weng Zuliang (Chinese: 翁祖亮; born July 1963) is a Chinese politician, who has served as the chairman of China Minmetals since July 2021. Between December 2016 and July 2021, he served as the Communist Party Secretary of Pudong New Area, a major economic development zone in Shanghai.

== Life and career ==
Weng was born in Fuqing County, Fujian. Weng began work in August 1983. He earned his diploma from the Shanghai Party School, and has an Executive MBA from the Macau University of Science and Technology. He is a senior engineer.

From 1983 to 2003, he worked at the Shanghai Gas Engine Institute as an engineer, and later administrative official, rising to become its leader. He then took on executive positions at the Shanghai Automotive Engineering Institute. In May 2003, he was transferred to the Shanghai Quality and technical Supervision Bureau, eventually rising to its head. In May 2008, he became deputy party chief of Luwan District in Shanghai, then assumed the position of district governor. In September 2011, he became district governor of Zhabei District. In April 2013, he was promoted to party chief of Zhabei District. In January 2015, he became party chief of Huangpu District.

In July 2016, he became district governor of Pudong, ascending to sub-provincial ranks. In December of that year, he became Communist Party Secretary of Pudong. He entered the municipal party standing committee in March 2017. He also concurrently served as the director of the Shanghai Free-Trade Zone.

Party political offices
Preceded by Shen Xiaoming	Communist Party Secretary of Pudong; 2016–2021	Succeeded by Zhu Zhisong
