= China Metallurgical Group Corporation =

Chinese state-owned enterprise

China Metallurgical Group Corporation 中国冶金科工集团有限公司
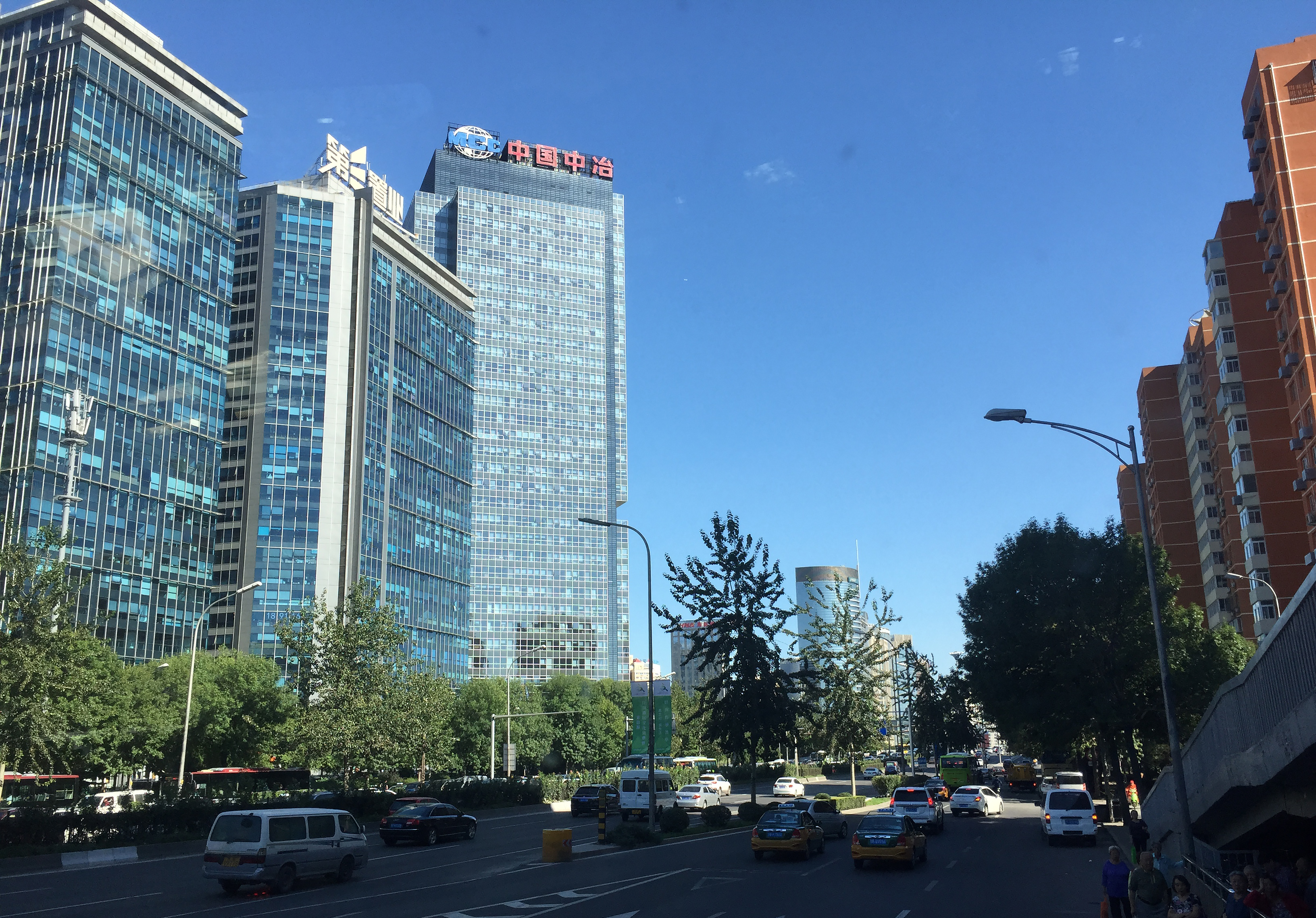
- Type: Subsidiary
- Industry: Engineering, Metallurgy, Mining, Construction
- Founded: 1982; 44 years ago
- Headquarters: Beijing, China
- Area served: Worldwide
- Key people: Guo Wenqing (Chairman)
- Parent: China Minmetals
- Subsidiaries: Metallurgical Corporation of China Limited
- Website: www.mcc.com.cn

China Metallurgical Group Corporation
- Simplified Chinese: 中国冶金科工集团有限公司
- Traditional Chinese: 中國冶金科工集團有限公司
Transcriptions
Standard Mandarin
- Hanyu Pinyin: Zhōngguó Yějīn Kēgōng Jítuán Yǒuxiàn Gōngsī

China Metallurgical Group Corporation (CMGC, Chinese: 中国冶金科工集团有限公司) is a Chinese state-owned enterprise headquartered in Beijing. It is primarily involved in engineering contracting, metallurgical construction, resource development, and mining.

On December 8, 2015, CMGC was merged into China Minmetals Corporation, becoming a wholly owned subsidiary of Minmetals as part of a broader restructuring of central state-owned enterprises.

== Listed Subsidiary ==
CMGC operates commercially through its publicly listed arm, Metallurgical Corporation of China Limited (MCC), which was established in 2008 and listed on both the Shanghai Stock Exchange and Hong Kong Stock Exchange in 2009. MCC carries out the majority of the group’s construction, engineering, and mining projects both in China and internationally. As of 2025, CMGC holds a controlling 64.18% stake in MCC.

== Business Activities ==
CMGC and its subsidiaries are active in:

- Construction of metallurgical and industrial facilities, including steel plants and smelting operations
- Infrastructure projects such as railways, highways, power systems, and environmental engineering
- Mining development, particularly non-ferrous and ferrous metals
- General contracting and design of complex engineering projects (EPC)

The group has a historical strength in large-scale steel production facility construction and remains a core player in China’s metallurgy and mining infrastructure sector.
