= Zhu Zhisong =

Chinese politician

- 朱芝松

Communist Party Secretary of Pudong New Area
- In office August 2021 – November 2024
- Preceded by: Weng Zuliang
- Succeeded by: Li Zheng

Communist Party Secretary of Minhang District
- In office May 2017 – August 2021
- Preceded by: Zhao Qi
- Succeeded by: Ni Yaoming

Governor of Minhang District
- In office January 2016 – June 2017
- Preceded by: Zhao Zhuping
- Succeeded by: Ni Yaoming

Personal details
- Born: February 1969 (age 57) Ganyu County, Jiangsu, China
- Party: Chinese Communist Party (expelled in June 2025)
- Education: Harbin Institute of Technology

Zhu Zhisong (Chinese: 朱芝松; pinyin: Zhū Zhīsōng; born February 1969) is a former Chinese executive and politician. He was investigated by China's top anti-graft agency in November 2024. Previously he served as party secretary of Pudong New District.

Zhu is a representative of the 20th National Congress of the Chinese Communist Party and an alternate member of the 20th Central Committee of the Chinese Communist Party. He was a delegate to the 13th National People's Congress.

== Early life and education ==
Zhu was born in Ganyu County (now Ganyu District of Lianyungang), Jiangsu, in February 1969.

== Career ==
After graduating from Harbin Institute of Technology in 1989, Zhu was despatched to the 800th Research Institute of Shanghai Space Administration (now Shanghai Academy of Spaceflight Technology), where he successively worked as a technician, deputy director of the Research Laboratory, director of the Research Laboratory, deputy chief technologist of the institute, deputy director and then director of the Overall Institute. At there, Zhu eventually became director in November 2008.

Zhu got involved in politics in May 2014, when he was appointed deputy head of the Organization Department of the CCP Shanghai Municipal Committee. He became governor of Minhang District, a district under the jurisdiction of Shanghai, in December 2015, and then party secretary, the top political position in the district, beginning in May 2017. In August 2019, he was made deputy secretary-general of Shanghai but has held the position for only more than a year. In August 2021, he was admitted to member of the CCP Shanghai Committee, the city's top authority. He also served as party secretary of Pudong New Area, director of the management committee of China (Shanghai) Pilot Free Trade Zone, director and party secretary of the Lingang New Area Management Committee of China (Shanghai) Pilot Free Trade Zone, and director of Yangshan Special Comprehensive Bonded Zone Management Committee.

== Downfall ==
On 27 November 2024, Zhu was suspected of "serious violations of laws and regulations" by the Central Commission for Discipline Inspection (CCDI), the party's internal disciplinary body, and the National Supervisory Commission, the highest anti-corruption agency of China.

On 10 June 2025, Zhu was expelled from the CCP and removed from public office.

On 23 June 2026, Zhu was sentenced to death with a two-year reprieve for bribery by Nanchang Intermediate People's Court.

Government offices
Preceded by Yuan Jie	Director of Shanghai Space Administration; 2008–2014	Succeeded by Dai Shoulun
Preceded by Zhao Zhuping	Governor of Minhang District; 2016–2017	Succeeded by Ni Yaoming
Party political offices
Preceded by Zhao Qi	Communist Party Secretary of Minhang District; 2017–2021	Succeeded by Ni Yaoming
Preceded by Weng Zuliang	Communist Party Secretary of Pudong New Area; 2021–2024	Succeeded by Li Zheng
