= MMG Limited =

Mining company

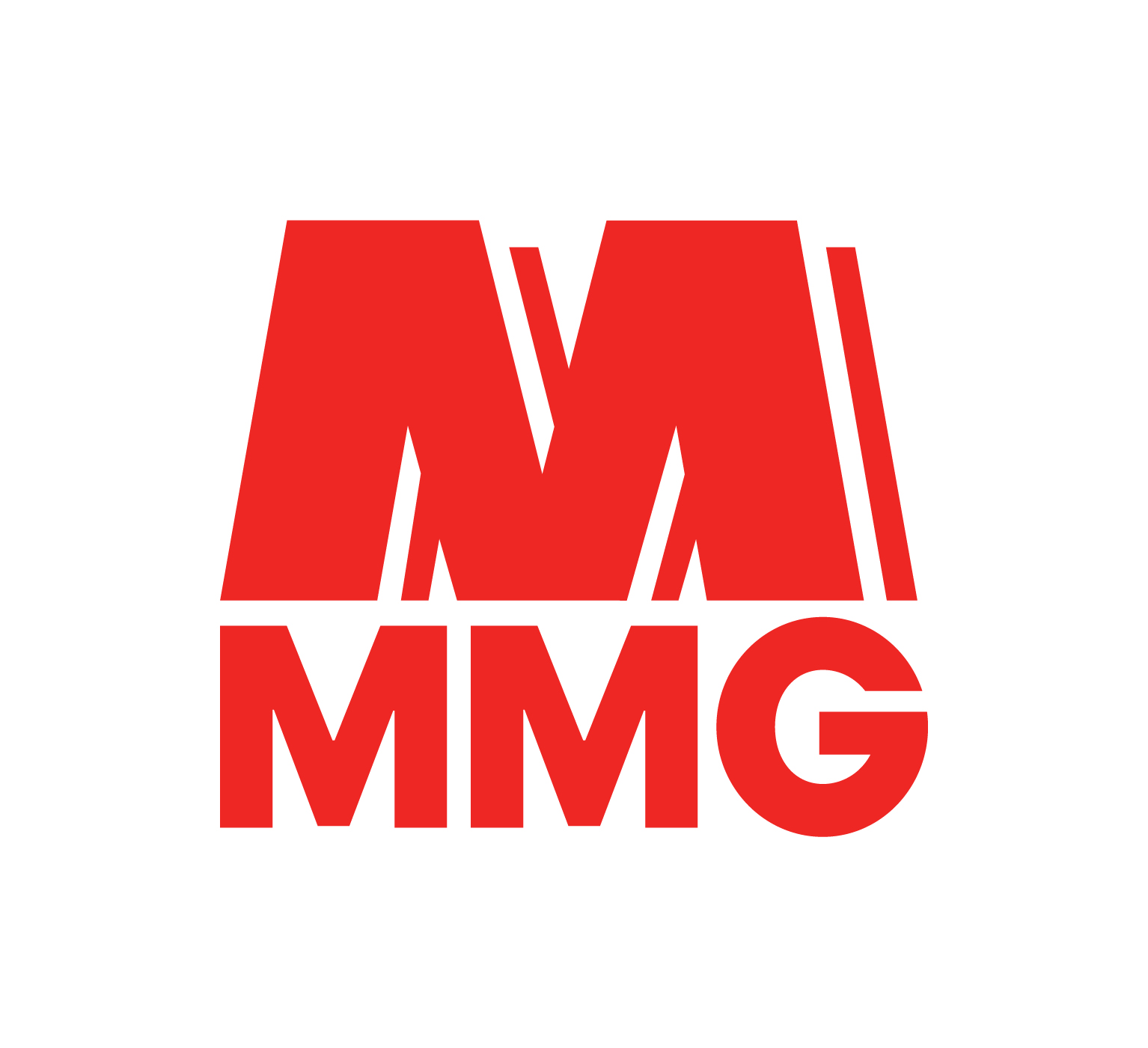
- Company type: Public
- Traded as: SEHK: 1208
- Industry: Mining
- Founded: 17 June 2009
- Headquarters: Melbourne, Australia
- Key people: Jiqing Xu (Chairman); Ivo Zhao (CEO)
- Products: Copper, gold, lead, molybdenum, silver, zinc
- Revenue: US$ 4.5 billion (2024)
- Website: www.mmg.com

MMG Limited is a mid-tier global resources company that mines, explores and develops base metal projects around the world. MMG's largest shareholder is China Minmetals with 67.49%.

== History ==
MMG was formed in June 2009, following the purchase of the majority of assets of Oz Minerals by China Minmetals.

In December 2010, MMG was acquired by Minmetals Resources, a subsidiary of China Minmetals and listed on the Hong Kong Stock Exchange.

In September 2012, Minmetals Resources Limited changed its registered company name to MMG Limited to align the assets already operating as MMG with the registered company name.

MMG had a secondary listing on the Australian Securities Exchange from December 2015 until its delisting on December 2019.

== Operations ==
MMG operate and develop copper, zinc and other base metals projects across Australia, Botswana, the Democratic Republic of the Congo and Peru.

=== Current ===
- Dugald River mine in Cloncurry, Queensland
- Kinsevere mine in the Democratic Republic of Congo
- Khoemacau mine in the Botswana
- Las Bambas copper mine in Peru (62.5%)
- Rosebery mine in Tasmania

=== Former ===
- Century Mine
- Golden Grove Mine
- Sepon mine
