= Metallurgical Corporation of China =

Chinese state-owned company

- Native name: 中国冶金科工股份有限公司
- Type: Public
- Traded as: SSE: 601618 (A-shares); SEHK: 1618 (H-shares)
- Industry: Mining, Engineering, Construction
- Founded: 2008
- Headquarters: Beijing, China
- Area served: Worldwide
- Key people: Guo Wenqing (Chairman)
- Products: Steel structures, metallurgical products, non-ferrous metals
- Services: Engineering, construction, resource development, real estate
- Revenue: ▼CN¥1,087.4 billion (2024)
- Net income: ▼CN¥12.6 billion (2024)
- Total assets: ▲CN¥590.3 billion (2024)
- Owner: Central Government of China (indirect); General public
- Parent: China Metallurgical Group Corporation (64.18%)
- Website: www.mccchina.com

Metallurgical Corporation of China Limited
- Simplified Chinese: 中国冶金科工股份有限公司
- Traditional Chinese: 中國冶金科工股份有限公司
Transcriptions
Standard Mandarin
- Hanyu Pinyin: Zhōngguó yějīn kēgōng gǔfèn yǒuxiàn gōngsī

Metallurgical Corporation of China Limited (MCC) is a publicly listed Chinese engineering and construction enterprise. It trades on both the Shanghai Stock Exchange and the Hong Kong Stock Exchange under the stock codes SSE: 601618 and SEHK: 1618, respectively. The company is primarily engaged in metallurgical engineering, project contracting, resource development, and real estate. The listed entity was formed through the corporatization of operating subsidiaries and assets of its parent group and continues projects initiated prior to its 2008 listing.

== Corporate Affairs ==
MCC is a core subsidiary of China Metallurgical Group Corporation (CMGC), which holds a majority stake of 64.18% in the listed entity. In 2015, CMGC was merged into China Minmetals Corporation, making MCC part of one of China's largest state-owned resource conglomerates. While CMGC oversees the group's broader industrial and resource activities, the listed company serves as the principal platform for engineering, construction, and mining operations.

== History ==
MCC was established in 2008 as part of a corporate restructuring to list key assets of China Metallurgical Group Corporation. Upon incorporation, the newly listed company assumed control of ongoing domestic and overseas projects, contracts, and investments that had been undertaken by CMGC and its predecessor subsidiaries prior to 2008. It quickly became one of China's major state-owned listed enterprises in engineering and industrial construction. Historically, Baosteel Group held a minority shareholding in the company.

== Operations ==
=== Mainland China ===
MCC is a leading metallurgical construction contractor in China, responsible for building the majority of China's steel plants and related infrastructure. The company is also engaged in public infrastructure, including railways, highways, urban transport, and ecological remediation.

=== Saindak Copper-Gold Mine ===
MCC operates the Saindak Copper-Gold Project in Balochistan, Pakistan. The mine was originally built between 1990 and 1995 by predecessor entities within China Metallurgical Group Corporation, and began commercial production in 2002 under a lease agreement with the Pakistani government. The contract has since been extended multiple times, most recently until October 2022.

=== Mes Aynak Copper Project ===
In 2007, China Metallurgical Group Corporation, whose relevant assets were later injected into MCC upon listing, was awarded the development rights to the Mes Aynak copper mine in Afghanistan, one of the world's largest untapped copper deposits. The project has faced delays due to security concerns and archaeological preservation. As of 2021, full-scale construction had not begun.

=== Ramu Nickel-Cobalt Project ===
MCC, through its subsidiary Ramu NiCo Management (MCC) Limited, manages the Ramu Nickel Mine in Papua New Guinea. The project, valued at over US$1.4 billion, includes a nickel-cobalt mine and a high-pressure acid leach processing facility. It is considered one of China's largest overseas mining investments. The project has faced legal and environmental controversy, particularly over its deep-sea tailings disposal method.
