= Ramu Nickel Mine =

Nickel and cobalt mine in Papua New Guinea

- Location within Papua New Guinea
- Location: Madang Province, Papua New Guinea; 5°34′7.4″S 145°13′6.8″E
- Products: Nickel, Cobalt
- Production: 68.9 Mt (reserves)
- Financial year: 2023
- Opened: 2012
- Company: MCC Ramu NiCo Ltd., Nickel 28 Capital Corp. (minority)

The Ramu Nickel Mine is a major nickel and cobalt mining operation located in Madang Province, Papua New Guinea. The mine is operated by MCC Ramu NiCo Ltd., a subsidiary of the state-owned Metallurgical Corporation of China (MCC), and is one of the most significant sources of nickel and cobalt in the Asia-Pacific region. The project has been in commercial operation since 2012.

== Ownership and operation ==
The Ramu mine is majority-owned and operated by MCC Ramu NiCo Ltd., which is 67.02% owned by MCC. The operation is managed by Ramu NiCo Management (MCC) Limited, a wholly owned subsidiary of MCC. Minority ownership is held by Nickel 28 Capital Corp., a Canadian company listed on the TSX Venture Exchange. As of 2024, Nickel 28 holds an 8.56% joint venture interest in Ramu, with an option to increase its ownership to 20.55% upon repayment of construction debt and exercise of additional purchase rights at market value.

== Geology and production ==
The Ramu project is located in a laterite nickel-cobalt deposit. The ore is primarily found in the rocky saprolite layers of the mining concession, with resource classification following the JORC Code standards. Ramu has been in continuous production since 2012, delivering nickel and cobalt to global markets, particularly for use in batteries and electric vehicles. As of 2024, the mine has enough proven and probable reserves to support operations for at least 15 more years, with the potential for extension based on further exploration.

== Pollution ==
In 2000 an independent report was commissioned by the Evangelical Lutheran Church of Papua New Guinea into the potential environmental impact of the mine. The report concluded that the mine's claim that discharging tailings off the coast would have no environmental impact was "exceedingly unlikely". The report found that the mine's environmental plan used inadequate data, faulty methodology, contradictory models, and was overly optimistic in general.

In August 2019 an independent probe found the mine had improperly discharged hundreds of thousands of litres of toxic slurry into the ocean. The toxic waste turned the beach red, and locals associated it with numerous health issues, including skin irritation. The government was considering legal action against the mine. Governor Peter Yama described it as the "worst environmental disaster in PNG history". In 2020 a coalition of locals and the provincial government sued the mine owners for K 18,000,000,000 as restitution for the environmental damage.
