= Oxiana Limited =

Mining company based in Melbourne, Victoria, Australia

- Formerly: Golden Plateau
- Type: Public
- Traded as: ASX: OXR
- Industry: Mining
- Founded: 1932
- Defunct: 2008
- Headquarters: Melbourne, Australia
- Key people: Barry Cusack (Chairman); Owen Hegarty (Managing Director)
- Revenue: $1.1 billion (2007)
- Operating income: $595 million (2007)
- Net income: $305 million (2007)
- Website: www.oxiana.com.au

Oxiana Limited was an Australian copper and gold miner and exploration company.

== History ==
Oxiana was founded in 1932 as Golden Plateau and listed on the Australian Securities Exchange. In the early 1980s, the company shifted its focus from gold mining to gold exploration. In 1995, Golden Plateau was renamed Oxiana Resources and in 2003 to Oxiana Limited.

The company's operations were located in Laos, Australia, Cyprus and the Philippines. It was focused on the operation and development of the Sepon copper and gold project in South East Laos, the Golden Grove Mine in Western Australia and development of the Prominent Hill copper/gold deposit in South Australia.

In June 2005, Oxiana purchased the Golden Grove Mine from Newmont.

In February 2007 Oxiana launched a friendly takeover bid for Agincourt, this bid was accepted in April. Oxiana acquired through this the Wiluna Gold Mine, the energy company Nova with its uranium rights at Wiluna and the Martabe Gold Project in Sumatra.

Oxiana sold the Wiluna Gold Mine in July 2007 to Apex Minerals.

In March 2008, Oxiana and Zinifex announced they intended to merge. The merger took effect on 20 June 2008 with a rebrand to OZ Minerals on 18 July 2008.

In 2023, Oxiana (Cambodia) Limited, a foreign subsidiary of Oxiana Limited that later became a part of the Oz Minerals group, was investigated by the Australian Federal Police over alleged foreign bribery.
