= Pasminco =

Former Australian mining company

- Type: Public
- Traded as: ASX: PAS
- Industry: Mining
- Founded: 1988
- Founder: Conzinc Riotinto of Australia; North Broken Hill Peko
- Defunct: 2004
- Fate: Bankruptcy, operations taken over by Zinifex
- Successor: Zinifex
- Headquarters: Melbourne, Australia
- Number of locations: Australia; The Netherlands; United States
- Products: Zinc, lead
- Website: www.pasminco.com.au

Pasminco was an Australian mining company founded in 1988. It was placed in voluntary administration in September 2001 with its assets sold in stages until 2004 when the remaining assets were spun-off to Zinifex.

== History ==
Pasminco was established in 1988 when Conzinc Riotinto of Australia and North Broken Hill Peko merged their lead and zinc operations. In May 1998 the Emu Bay Railway, which hauled trains from Pasminco's zinc mine at Rosebery to Burnie, was sold to Australian Transport Network.

On 19 September 2001, Pasminco was placed in voluntary administration due to a combination of low commodities prices, high debt servicing costs, the adverse impact of a weak Australian dollar on its currency hedging position and a failure to secure appropriate financial accommodation from its financiers. In March 2002, its Broken Hill mining operations were sold to Perilya.

Remaining assets including mines in Mount Isa and Rosebery, and smelters in Budel (The Netherlands), Clarkesville (United States), Hobart and Port Pirie, were spun-off to a new entity, Zinifex, which was listed on the Australian Securities Exchange in April 2004. Other assets including the Cockle Creek Smelter were wound down. The Cockle Creek Smelter was closed in September 2003 with the largest site remediation in Australia conducted over an 11-year period.

With this completed, in November 2014 administrator Ferrier Hodgson advised creditors they would receive 22 cents in the dollar.
