= Century Mine =

Mine in Queensland, Australia

- Interactive map of Century Mine

Location
- Location: Lawn Hill, Queensland, Australia

Production
- Products: Lead and zinc concentrates

History
- Discovered: 1990
- Opened: 1999
- Closed: 2015

Owner
- Company: CRA Limited (1990–1997); Pasminco (1997–2004); Zinifex (2004–2008); OZ Minerals (2008–2009); MMG Limited (2009–2017); New Century Resources (2017–2023), Sibanye-Stillwater (2023-)
- Website: https://www.sibanyestillwater.com/business/australia/century/

Century Mine was a large open cut zinc, lead and silver mine at Lawn Hill, 250 km (160 mi) northwest of Mount Isa in North West Queensland, Australia. It was Australia's largest open pit zinc mine. Discovered by CRA Limited, mining was initiated by Pasminco, continued by Zinifex, then OZ Minerals and then MMG Limited who mined the project until closure. The property was then owned by New Century Resources who were bought by Sibanye-Stillwater in 2023. The mine is in a phase of tailings reprocessing.

== History ==
The Century zinc deposit was discovered by CRA Limited in 1990 on Waanyi land. Development of the mine commenced in 1997. The mine began open-pit production in 1999.

Open-pit mining was completed at Century in August 2015, with final processing of Century-sourced ore occurring in November 2015. The last ore to be processed at Century was 450,000 tonnes that had been mined as part of the Dugald River mine's stoping trial, and then trucked to Century. The processing of this ore was completed in January 2016. The final shipment of zinc concentrate was exported from Karumba in late January 2016.

During its 16 years of operation, Century was one of the largest zinc mines in the world, producing and processing an average of 475,000 tpa of zinc concentrate and 50,000 tpa of lead concentrate. Mill tailings generated from 16 years of operations from the Century open pit forms a Proven Reserve of 77.3 million tonnes at 3.1% zinc-equivalent, for 2,287,000 tonnes of contained zinc.

New Century Resources, an Australian base metals development company, restarted Century Mine operations from August 2018 extracting zinc from the tailings.

== Operations ==
Zinc and lead concentrates are exported via the port at Karumba on the Gulf of Carpentaria. The zinc ore is especially prized because of its low iron content, producing a high quality clean zinc concentrate that is keenly sought by the world's zinc smelters. The concentrate is mixed with water and transported to the port by a 304 km (189 mi) pipeline.

=== Climate ===
Century Mine has a tropical semi-arid climate (Köppen: BSh) with a short wet season from December to March and a long dry season from April to November. The wettest recorded day was 8 March 2023 with 313.4 mm (12.34 in) of rainfall. Extreme temperatures ranged from 45.2 °C (113.4 °F) on 31 December 2023 to 4.0 °C (39.2 °F) on 23 July 2018.

Climate data for Century Mine (18.76°S 138.71°E) (127 m (417 ft) AMSL) (2003-2025)
Month	Jan	Feb	Mar	Apr	May	Jun	Jul	Aug	Sep	Oct	Nov	Dec	Year
Record high °C (°F)	45.1 (113.2)	43.2 (109.8)	43.9 (111.0)	40.4 (104.7)	38.5 (101.3)	35.3 (95.5)	35.9 (96.6)	38.0 (100.4)	41.7 (107.1)	43.9 (111.0)	44.7 (112.5)	45.2 (113.4)	45.2 (113.4)
Mean daily maximum °C (°F)	36.9 (98.4)	36.1 (97.0)	36.0 (96.8)	34.8 (94.6)	31.2 (88.2)	28.5 (83.3)	28.6 (83.5)	30.9 (87.6)	35.1 (95.2)	38.0 (100.4)	38.7 (101.7)	38.5 (101.3)	34.4 (94.0)
Mean daily minimum °C (°F)	25.1 (77.2)	24.3 (75.7)	23.8 (74.8)	21.0 (69.8)	17.2 (63.0)	13.8 (56.8)	12.9 (55.2)	13.6 (56.5)	17.6 (63.7)	21.5 (70.7)	23.9 (75.0)	25.2 (77.4)	20.0 (68.0)
Record low °C (°F)	19.8 (67.6)	16.8 (62.2)	17.5 (63.5)	11.4 (52.5)	8.0 (46.4)	4.3 (39.7)	4.0 (39.2)	4.4 (39.9)	8.3 (46.9)	8.7 (47.7)	15.3 (59.5)	15.1 (59.2)	4.0 (39.2)
Average precipitation mm (inches)	174.2 (6.86)	122.0 (4.80)	129.4 (5.09)	22.9 (0.90)	6.3 (0.25)	3.9 (0.15)	5.9 (0.23)	1.2 (0.05)	2.4 (0.09)	19.0 (0.75)	55.8 (2.20)	94.2 (3.71)	625.5 (24.63)
Average precipitation days (≥ 0.2 mm)	14.5	10.9	9.0	2.5	1.6	1.0	0.6	0.3	1.1	2.7	6.7	9.9	60.8
Source: Bureau of Meteorology (2003-2025)

== See also ==
- List of mines in Australia
- Mining in Australia
