= Ausenco =

Australian construction management company

- Type: Privately held company
- Industry: Engineering
- Founded: 1991; 35 years ago
- Founder: Zimi Meka
- Headquarters: South Brisbane, Queensland, Australia
- Key people: George Lloyd (Chairman); Zimi Meka (Chief Executive Officer)
- Services: Mining consulting services, project delivery
- Number of employees: 3,000 (2024)
- Website: www.ausenco.com

Ausenco is an Australian consulting engineering, procurement, and construction company that provides construction management, and operations service to the resources sectors. The company operates across a number of countries and its head office is in South Brisbane, Queensland, Australia.

== History ==
Ausenco was founded in Brisbane, Australia, in 1991, by Albanian Australian Zimi Meka, current CEO and Managing Director, and Bob Thorpe, current Board member. In 1995, the second office opened in Perth.

In 2002, the first institutional shareholders invested in Ausenco and former Premier of Queensland Wayne Goss was appointed chairman of the company. Ausenco established the Ascentis division in 2003 to deliver operations services to the minerals processing industry. In 2004, Ausenco opened an office in China, and then in 2005, opened offices in North America and South America.

The company listed on the Australian Securities Exchange on 15 June 2006.

In 2007, the Vancouver office opened, increasing the number of employees by 31% to 1,010 people globally. The Ausenco foundation was also launched in 2007 to offer support to the communities in which people from Ausenco live and work.

Ausenco began an expansion program in 2008 by acquiring several companies to enhance their service offering, including Vector Engineering, Pipeline Systems Incorporated (PSI) and Sandwell. This increased employee numbers by 150%, and expanded service offerings to include pipeline systems, ports & marine, environment & sustainability, and transportation systems. The Ausenco Taggart joint venture was also formed in 2008 to offer design and delivery expertise for coal handling processing plants.

In 2009, Ausenco acquired 50% equity in the Kramer Group to form Kramer Ausenco, expanding the company’s presence and services into PNG and the South Pacific.

Ausenco further diversified their offering in 2012 by acquiring 100% of Reaction Consulting. The Ausenco Rylson joint venture was also formed to expand offerings in asset optimization and management services.

George Lloyd was appointed Chairman in 2013, which was the same year Ausenco acquired PROJEX Technologies Ltd in Calgary, Alberta and Halifax, Nova Scotia, Canada.

In mid-2015, Ausenco formed a Strategic Alliance with Spanish multinational construction company Duro Felguera S.A. to jointly pursue and deliver Engineering, procurement, and construction (EPC) projects worldwide.

In September 2016, Ausenco was privatized via a Scheme of Arrangement with RCF V.I. LP and key shareholders. Ausenco was subsequently de-listed from the Australian Securities Exchange.

In 2017, Ausenco created a consulting business line comprising global practice areas including Mining Consulting, Environment & Sustainability, Pipelines, Transportation & Logistics, Integrated Technology Solutions, and Asset Management & Optimization Consulting. In November 2017, Ausenco acquired Hemmera, a leading environmental consultancy in Canada. Hemmera is now part of the Environment & Sustainability practice.

== Operations ==
Ausenco has worked on projects in over 80 countries around the world, and has around 3,000 employees as of 2024, across 26 offices in 15 countries.

== Major projects ==
Major projects have included:

- Chatree Gold Project, Thailand in 2000
- North Mara Gold Project, Tanzania in 2001
- Sepon Copper Gold Project, Laos in 2002
- Phu Kham Copper Gold Project, Laos in 2006
- Hidden Valley Gold Silver Project in Papua New Guinea in 2006
- Lumwana Copper Project, Zambia in 2008
- Isaac Pains Coal Mine, Australia in 2008
- Martabe Gold Silver Project, Indonesia in 2009
- Los Bronces Project, Chile
- Kwale Mineral Sands Project, Kenya in 2012
- Constancia Copper Project, Peru in 2012
- Tonkolili Iron Ore Phase 2, Sierra Leone in 2014
- Springsure Creek Coal Project, Australia
- Minas-Rio Project, Brazil in 2014
- Mount Owen Using flotation to improve coal recovery
