= OZ Minerals =

Mining company based in South Australia

- Type: Subsidiary
- Industry: Mining
- Founded: 1 July 2008
- Headquarters: Adelaide, Australia
- Key people: Rebecca McGrath (Chair); Andrew Cole (Managing Director)
- Products: Copper, Gold
- Revenue: $2.1 billion (2021)
- Operating income: $1.2 billion (2021)
- Net income: $531 million (2021)
- Parent: BHP
- Website: www.ozminerals.com

OZ Minerals was a mining company based in Adelaide, South Australia. Formerly listed on the Australian Securities Exchange, it was acquired by BHP in April 2023.

== History ==
OZ Minerals was formed on 1 July 2008 when Oxiana and Zinifex merged.

In February 2009 a takeover offer by China Minmetals was recommenced for acceptance by Oz Mineral's board of directors. The proposal was one of three high-profile moves by Chinese firms to acquire stakes in the Australian mineral sector in early 2009.

The China Minmetals offer along with other proposed purchases, especially the stake in Rio Tinto planned by Chinalco, caused great public furore, adding political pressure to block Minmetals.

In March 2009 the Government of Australia blocked the sale, citing national security concerns about the proximity of the Prominent Hill Mine to the RAAF Woomera Range Complex. A revised deal that excluded Prominent Hill was approved in April 2009.

In June 2009 China Minmetals' Australian assets were spun off to form MMG. The Martabe gold project in Indonesia was sold to China Sci-Tech Holdings in the same month.

In 2015, with its activities concentrated on the Prominent Hill mine and the nearby Carapateena prospect in South Australia, OZ Minerals moved its headquarters from Melbourne to Adelaide. in 2016, OZ Minerals commenced construction of its Carapateena mine.

In April 2023, Oz Minerals was taken over by BHP and delisted from the Australian Securities Exchange.

== Operations ==
=== Current ===
- Antas mine, Parauapebas, Brazil
- Carrapateena mine
- Prominent Hill Mine

=== Former ===
- Century Mine
- Golden Grove Mine
- Martabe mine
