= Haselgebirge =

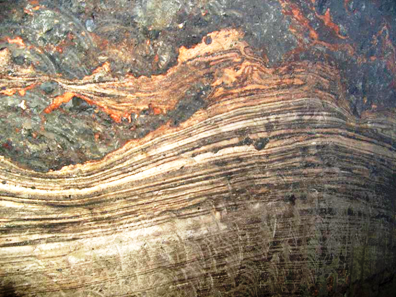
Haselgebirge of Berchtesgaden salt mines

Haselgebirge is an evaporite sedimentary rock type composed of 10-70wt% halite, with clasts of anhydrite, mudrock, and polyhalite in a halite matrix. Bodies of pure rocksalt within the haselgebirge display red to dark color bands of foliation. Tectonic deformation occurred between the Late Jurassic to the Neogene, resulting in a two-component tectonite, haselgebirge and kerngebirge (more than 70wt% halite). Within the fault zones the haselgebirge forms protocataclasites, while the kerngebirge, and pure rock salt, form mylonites and ultramylonites. The Haselgebirge Formation is mined in Altaussee, Berchtesgarden, and Dürrnberg.
