= Port Augusta Airport =

Airport in Port Augusta West, South Australia

Port Augusta Airport Laurie Wallis Aerodrome
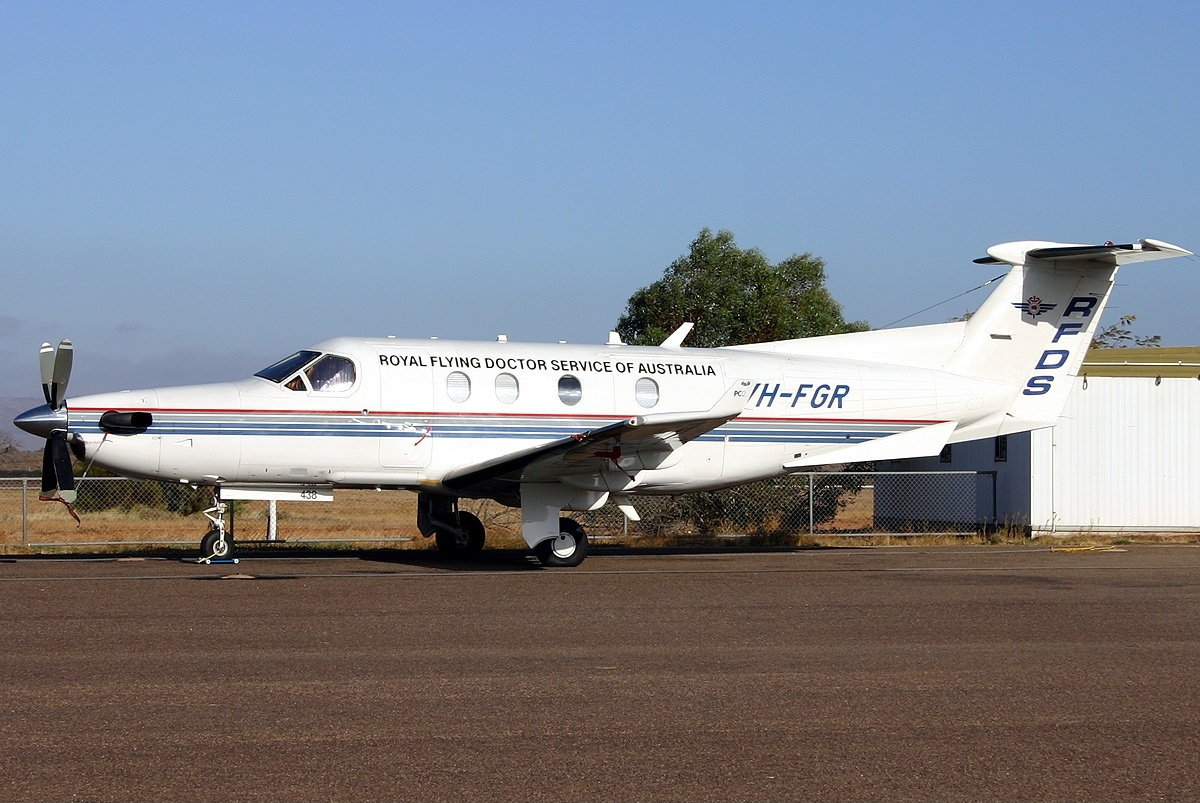
- RFDS Pilatus PC-12 at Port Augusta airport in 2005
- IATA: PUG; ICAO: YPAG

Summary
- Airport type: Public
- Owner/Operator: City of Port Augusta
- Serves: Port Augusta West, South Australia, Australia
- Location: Port Augusta West
- Opened: 1984
- Elevation AMSL: 56 ft (17 m)
- Coordinates: 32°30′25″S 137°43′00″E
- Website: www.portaugusta.sa.gov.au

Map
- Location in South Australia

Runways
Direction	Length		Surface
Direction	m	ft	Surface
15/33	1,650	5,413	Asphalt
- Sources: Australian AIP and aerodrome chart

Port Augusta Airport (IATA: PUG, ICAO: YPAG), also known as Laurie Wallis Aerodrome, is an airport located 3 nautical miles (5.6 km; 3.5 mi) west of Port Augusta, South Australia. It is located in the suburb of Port Augusta West, serving the Iron Triangle region alongside Whyalla.

== Overview ==
Laurie Wallis Aerodrome was first opened in 1984, named after Laurie Wallis, a member of the Australian House of Representatives representing the regional South Australian seat of Grey between 1969 to 1983, who had died that year.

The airport serves as a gateway to the city of Port Augusta, as well as isolated mineral projects in the north of the state. Other operations include a base for the Royal Flying Doctor Service which maintains administrative, engineering and hangar facilities for the Pilatus PC-12 fleet at the airport. The majority of traffic at the airport are general aviation related movements, and the Port Augusta Aero Club is also located here. The airfield has previously supported charter operations using larger jets such as the Fokker 100 and British Aerospace 146 under a concession by the Civil Aviation Safety Authority, however these operations are no longer permitted due to apron constraints and jet blast clearances.

== Airlines and destinations ==
In September 2017, Rex Airlines commenced operating a thrice weekly service from Adelaide and Coober Pedy with a Saab 340 after Sharp Airlines withdrew from the route. This service was suspended in April 2020. Until its cessation in 2005, Airlines of South Australia served the airport.

Airlines	Destinations
National Jet Express	Mining Charter: Adelaide, Prominent Hill, Carrapateena
