= Martabe mine =

Mine in Indonesia

- Interactive map of Martabe mine
- Location: Western Sumatra, Indonesia; 1°31′41.4″N 99°03′46.7″E
- Products: Gold, silver
- Type: Open mine

The Martabe mine is an open pit mine that is one of the largest gold mines in western Sumatra island, Indonesia and in the world. This mine also mines silver. The Martabe mine will continue to be mined until 2032. In 2022, various processing plant facilities were added and refined to support gold and silver mining operations. It produces 250,000 oz of gold per annum.

== Background ==
The mine is located in the west of the country in North Sumatra. The mine has measured reserves (as of 31 December 2013) of 3.0 million oz of gold and 31.9 million oz of silver; these reserves are included in mineral resources (that may or may not be economic to mine) of 8.1 million oz of gold and 73.8 million oz of silver.

Engineering, procurement, and construction management (EPCM) services for Martabe Mine were provided by Ausenco Limited in 2011.

Martabe mine is owned and operated by a subsidiary of PT United Tractors Tbk, the largest distributor of heavy equipment in Indonesia.
