= Prominent Hill mine =

Mine in South Australia

Prominent Hill Mine
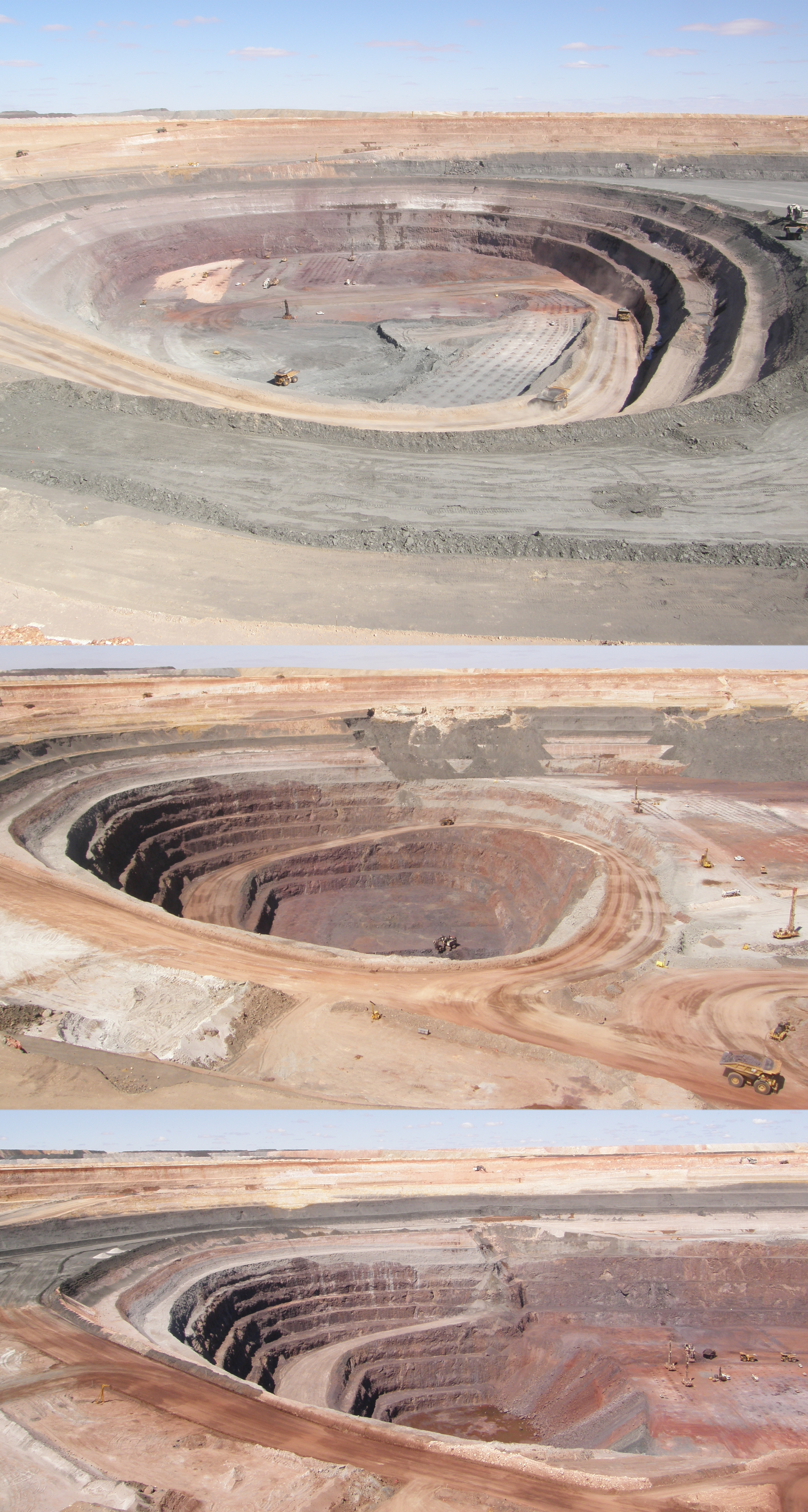
- Prominent Hill open pit from September 2008 to September 2010

- Location in Australia
- Location: Coober Pedy, South Australia, Australia; 29°43′10″S 135°35′00″E
- Products: Copper; Gold; Silver
- Production: Copper: 60,145 tonnes Gold: 90,821 ounces Silver: 361,767 ounces
- Financial year: 2009-10
- Opened: 2009
- Company: BHP
- Acquired: 2009

The Prominent Hill Mine is a major copper, silver, and gold mine in north west South Australia, 130 km south-east of Coober Pedy, which was developed by Oxiana Limited, later to become Oz Minerals, and now owned by BHP. The deposit is an iron oxide copper gold style mineralisation.

The mine, which cost A$1.15 billion to develop, was projected to produce 100,000 tonnes of copper and 115,000 ounces of gold in concentrates per year. As of 2018, the mine life was expected to extend to 2030.

== History ==
Oxiana Limited developed the mine from August 2006, having first got involved in the project in 2003 and having bought its partner, Minotaur Exploration Limited in 2005.

The mine went into production in February 2009. The mine was opened in May 2009 by South Australian Premier Mike Rann. The development included an open-pit mine, a conventional grinding and flotation processing plant, a permanent village to accommodate the workforce and construction of a haulage road, power line and bore field. There are two underground mines accessed through the open pit. The Malu mine extends vertically below the bottom of the open pit. The Ankata mine opened in 2012 and is about 2 km west of the main mine. Ankata means dragon lizard in a local indigenous language. It is accessed from a decline portal in the pit wall to access a deposit removed from the main one.

Resources of the deposit are 152.8 Mt at 1.18% Cu, 0.48 g/t Au and 2.92 g/t Ag plus 38.3 Mt at 1.17 g/t Au of non-sulfide ore.

In contrast to the Olympic Dam deposit, an iron oxide copper gold deposit of similar age about 200 km to the southeast of Prominent Hill, uranium values do not exceed 150 ppm and therefore uranium recovery is not economical.

The mine was part of the sale of its assets by Oz Minerals to China Minmetals, majority-owned by the Chinese state, but was blocked by the Australian Government, which cited national security concerns since Prominent Hill was within a sensitive military area. Subsequently, the sale of the other Oz Minerals mines went ahead after Prominent Hill was excluded. It is currently owned by BHP following its acquisition of Oz Minerals in 2023.

== Transport of product ==
Copper–gold concentrate product from Prominent Hill is transported in 30-tonne containers by road for 120 km (75 mi) to Wirrida siding on the Adelaide–Darwin rail corridor, where it is railed to Port Adelaide.

== Geology and mineralogy ==
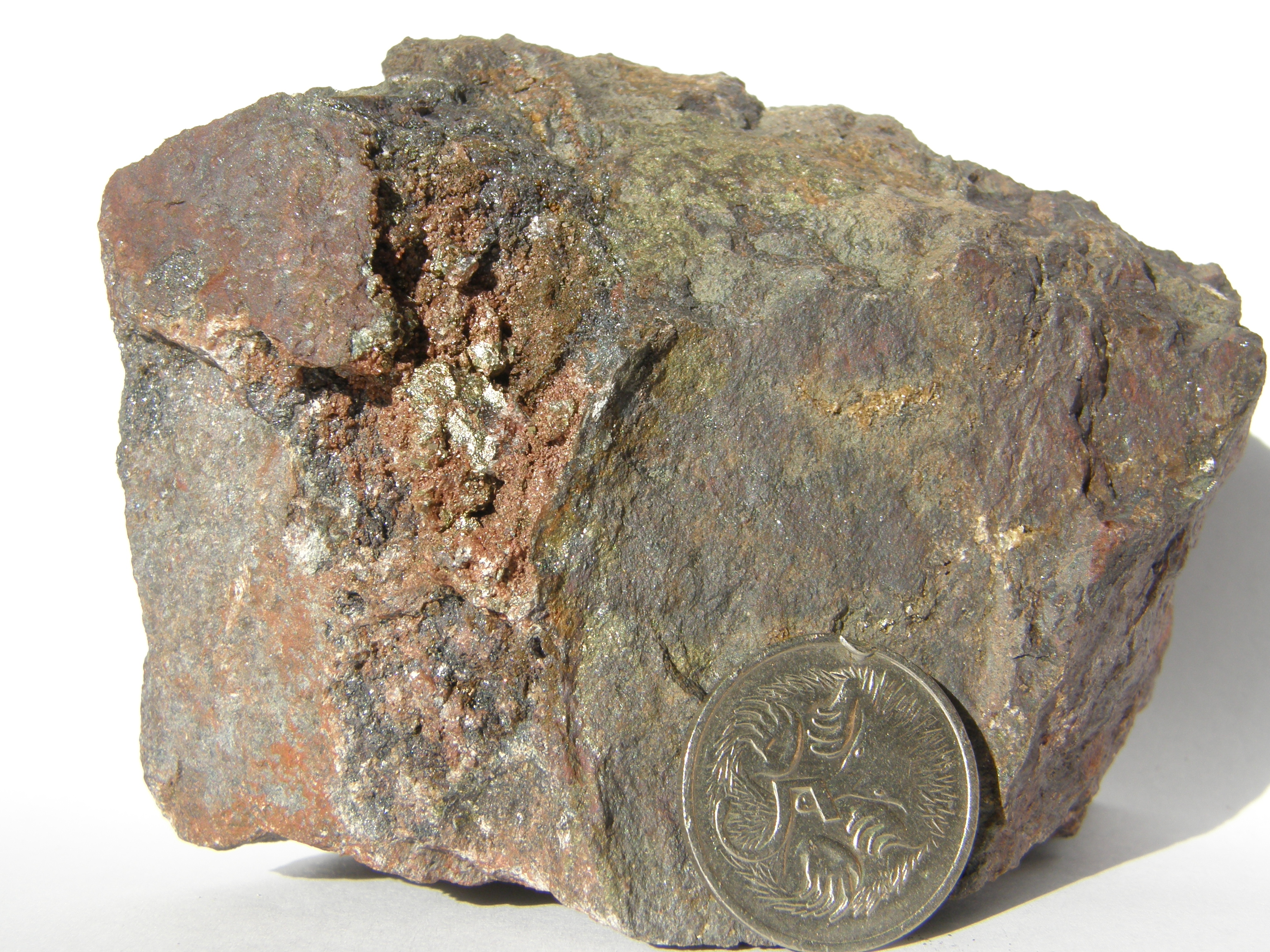
Chalcopyrite in hematised breccia from Prominent Hill, with 5-cent coin to scale

The deposit is located in the Gawler craton and it is hosted mainly in a fault zone where Hiltaba Suite granites overthrust a Mesoproterozoic volcano-sedimentary sequence. The age of the mineralisation is about 1.58 billion years. It consists of a breccia containing host rock clasts (dolomite, sandstone, andesite) which is intensively hematite, chlorite and sericite altered. Major sulfide minerals are pyrite, chalcopyrite, bornite and chalcocite.

== Sources ==
- The Australian Mines Handbook: 2003-2004 Edition, Louthean Media, Editor: Ross Louthean
