= Zinifex =

Former Australian mining company

- Type: Public
- Traded as: ASX: ZFX
- Industry: Mining and refining
- Founded: 2002
- Defunct: 30 June 2008
- Fate: Merged with Oxiana to form Oz Minerals
- Successor: Oz Minerals
- Headquarters: Melbourne, Australia
- Products: Zinc, lead, silver
- Revenue: $4.6 billion (2007)
- Operating income: $1.7 billion (2007)
- Net income: $1.3 billion (2007)
- Website: www.zinifex.com.au

Zinifex was an Australian company that operated lead and zinc mines, refineries and a lead smelter. It was established in April 2004, when the assets of Pasminco were spun-off. In 2008 it merged with Oxiana to form Oz Minerals.

== History ==
In September 2001, Pasminco was placed in voluntary administration. Some assets were sold by administrator Ferrier Hodgson, with the remaining profitable assets spun-off to a new entity, Zinifex, which was listed on the Australian Securities Exchange (ASX) in April 2004. Assets included mines in Mount Isa and Rosebery, and smelters in Budel (The Netherlands), Clarkesville (United States), Hobart and Port Pirie.

After floating on the ASX, Zinifex proved successful mainly due to the company keeping no hedges in place, and benefiting from rises in the zinc price. The share price rose from $1.80 in April 2004 to over $18 in December 2006.

On 1 July 2008, Zinifex merged with Oxiana to form Oz Minerals.

== Operations ==
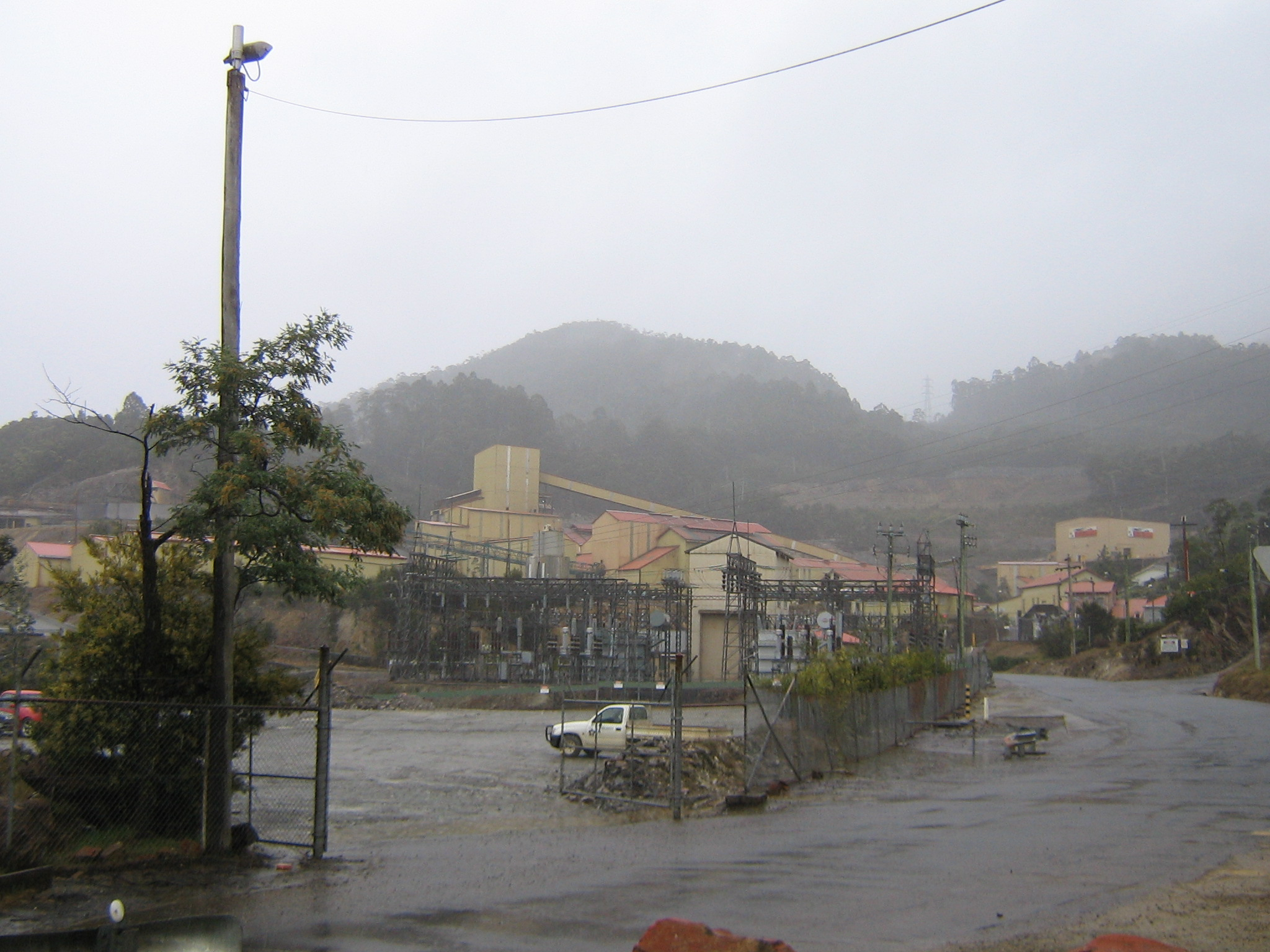
Above-ground workings at the Rosebery mine in Rosebery, Tasmania

Zinifex was engaged in minerals exploration, production and smelting to produce zinc and lead concentrates, and zinc, lead and silver metals together with various alloys and byproducts, and the marketing of these products. The segments of the company included Century Mine in Mount Isa, a large open cut zinc, lead and silver mine, operating on a mining lease secured for at least the life of the mine; Rosebery Mine in Rosebery, Tasmania, a medium-sized underground zinc, lead, silver, gold and copper mine; Port Pirie Smelter, a primary lead smelting facility; Australian Refined Alloys, an acid battery and lead recycling business owned 50% by Zinifex in a joint venture with Sims Metal; Budel Smelter, an electrolytic smelter, and Clarksville Smelter, a modern smelter to access a large portion of the United States zinc market.

In December 2006, Zinifex announced it would merge its smelting operations with those of Umicore, to form Nyrstar that was floated in October 2007. This left Zinifex as purely a mining company.

In early 2007, a number of incidents affected Zinifex: The Port Pirie smelter had a steam explosion in February and an explosion when moisture contacted molten copper in March. It also had a loading barge used to export ore from the Century Mine damaged in a cyclone.

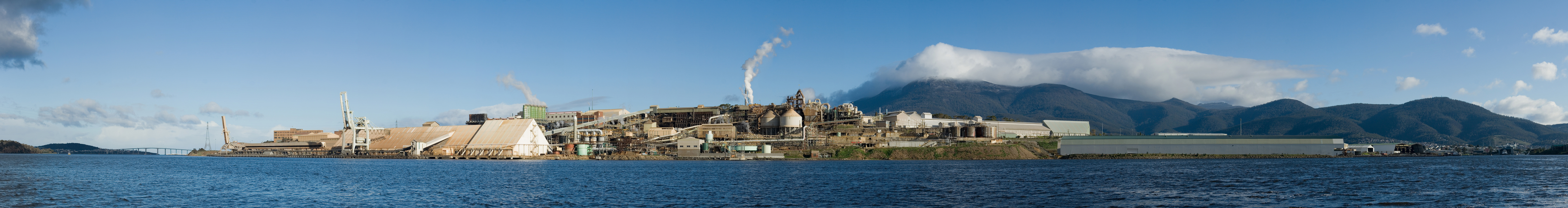
The zinc works at Lutana
