= China Minmetals =

Chinese metal and minerals company

China Minmetals Corporation 中国五矿集团公司

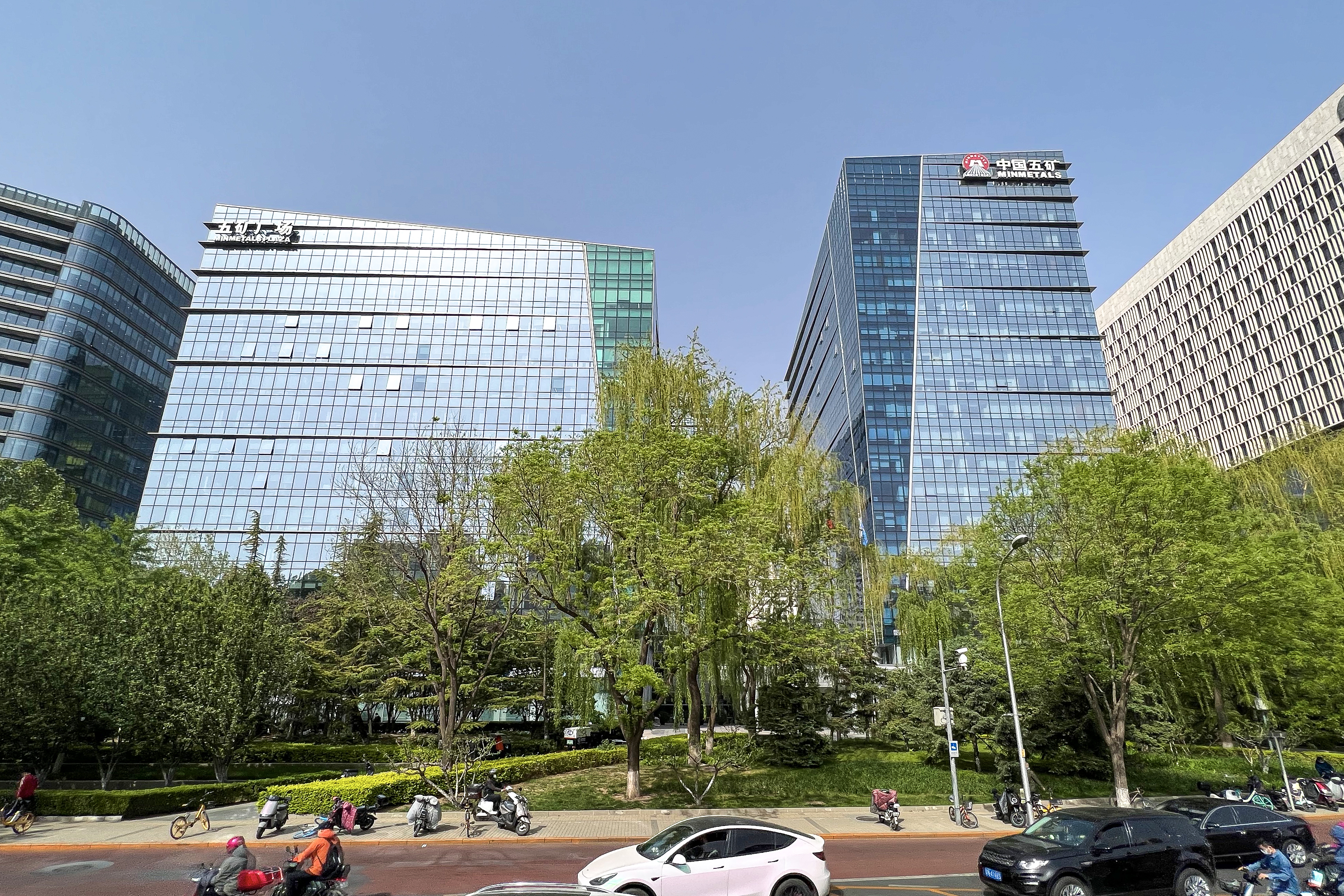
- Minmetals Plaza, the headquarters of China Minmetals
- Type: State-owned enterprise
- Industry: Metals, Minerals, Trading company, Mining, Engineering
- Founded: 1950; 76 years ago
- Headquarters: Beijing, China
- Area served: Worldwide (34 countries and regions)
- Key people: Weng Zuliang (Chairman)
- Products: Iron, Steel, Copper, Zinc, Lead, Nickel, Commodities
- Revenue: US$ 132.0 billion (2023)
- Net income: US$ 766 million (2023)
- Total assets: US$ 159.6 billion (2023)
- Number of employees: 175,524 (2023)
- Subsidiaries: China Metallurgical Group Corporation
- Website: www.minmetals.com

China Minmetals
- Simplified Chinese: 中国五矿集团公司
- Traditional Chinese: 中國五礦集團公司
Transcriptions
Standard Mandarin
- Hanyu Pinyin: Zhōngguó Wǔkuàng Jítuán Gōngsī

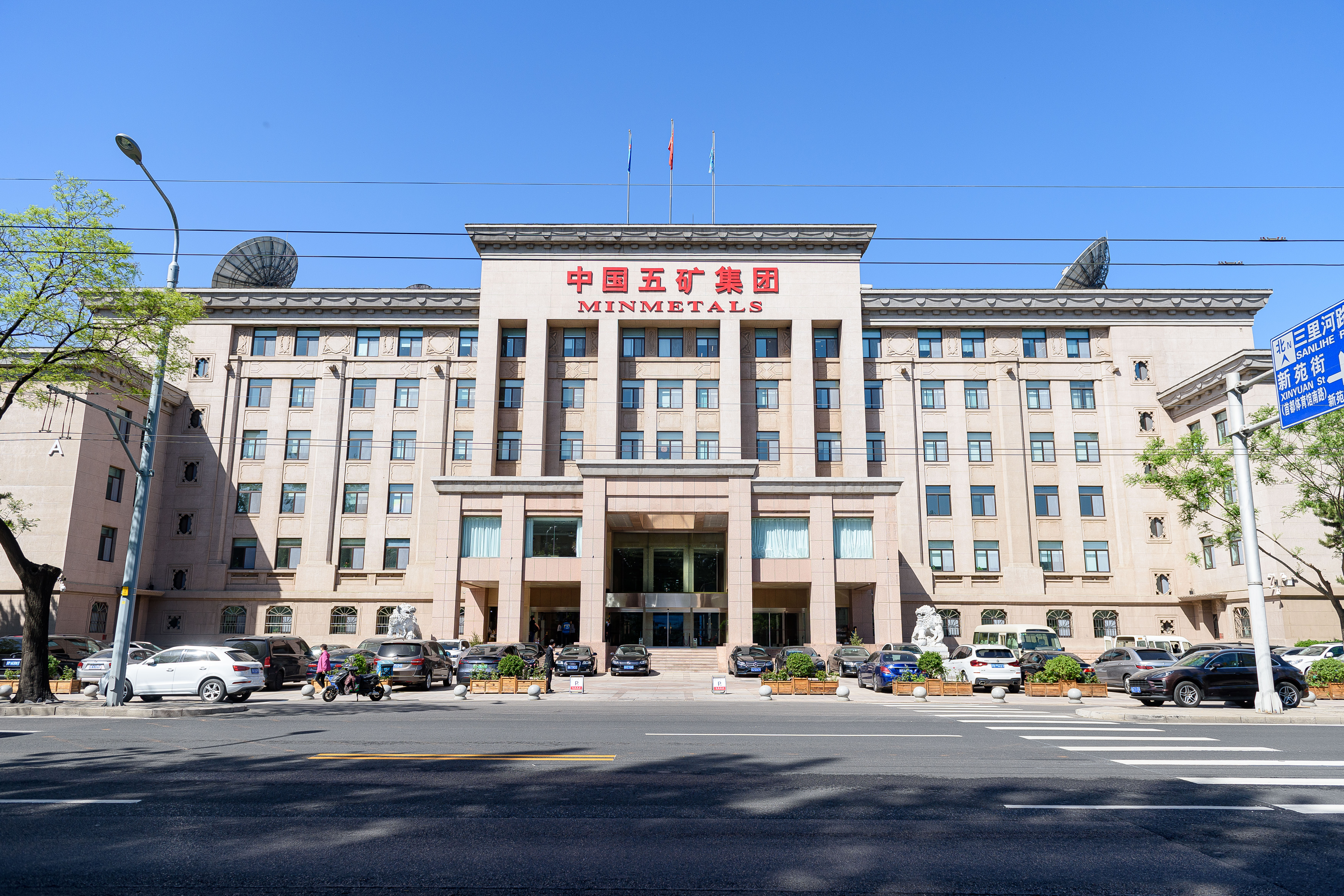
China Minmetals Building at Sanlihe Rd, Beijing

China Minmetals Corporation is a Chinese state-owned enterprise headquartered in Beijing. It is one of the largest metal and mineral trading companies in the world, operating in more than 30 countries across mining, metal trading, engineering, and investment. In 2024, China Minmetals ranked 190th on the World's 500 Most Influential Brands list by World Brand Lab.

== Corporate Affairs ==
China Minmetals is under the supervision of the State-owned Assets Supervision and Administration Commission (SASAC) of the State Council. The company owns and controls a number of major subsidiaries, including:

- China Metallurgical Group Corporation (CMGC): a major engineering and mining enterprise, fully merged into Minmetals in 2015. CMGC operates commercially through its publicly listed arm, Metallurgical Corporation of China Limited (MCC), which was established in 2008 and listed on both the Shanghai Stock Exchange and Hong Kong Stock Exchange in 2009. MCC carries out the majority of the group's construction, engineering, and mining projects both in China and internationally.
- Minmetals Development Co., Ltd. (SSE: 600058): a Shanghai-listed subsidiary focused on domestic and international trading of steel products, coal, coke, iron ore, and other mineral commodities. It also provides integrated logistics, freight forwarding, and storage services, and operates in ancillary sectors such as hotel management and technology services.

In the United States, Minmetals operates through Minmetals Inc., headquartered in Weehawken, New Jersey. The company is a participant in the United Nations Global Compact's LEAD program for corporate sustainability.

== History ==
China Minmetals was founded in 1950. Originally focused on trading steel and metals, the company expanded into mining, engineering, and real estate through several waves of reform and acquisition.

In 2015, China Minmetals acquired China Metallurgical Group Corporation, a state-owned engineering and mining group, as part of the Chinese government's state enterprise reform and consolidation strategy.

Since 2022, the company has maintained operations in Russia despite international sanctions following the invasion of Ukraine, drawing global scrutiny.

== Operations ==
China Minmetals Corporation oversees one of the most extensive mining portfolios among Chinese state-owned enterprises. Its activities span Asia, Oceania, Africa, and the Americas, and involve more than 38 mines, 15 of which are large-scale operations. The group produces copper, zinc, nickel, cobalt, lead, iron ore, alumina, and rare earth elements, and conducts most of its overseas mining through the Hong Kong-listed subsidiary MMG Limited. Outside MMG, Minmetals holds a majority interest in the Ramu Nickel–Cobalt Mine in Papua New Guinea through its wholly owned arm MCC; the operation yielded 28,669 t of nickel and 2,625 t of cobalt in 2024.

In an example of a major domestic project, in September 2024 the company launched a ¥10 billion joint venture in Qinghai province to build a lithium- and potassium-extraction hub at the Qinghai Salt Lake, marking Minmetals' formal entry into battery-materials production.

The group is also pursuing future-facing minerals on the ocean floor: in May 2017 Minmetals International Mining Co. signed a 15-year contract with the International Seabed Authority to explore polymetallic nodules in the Clarion–Clipperton Zone of the Pacific.
