= List of airports serving Melbourne =

Melbourne airports

Melbourne, the capital of the Australian state of Victoria, is served by several airports that support a range of aviation activities including international and domestic commercial flights, general aviation, pilot training, air charter services, and military operations.

The primary gateway to the city is Melbourne Airport (Tullamarine), the second-busiest airport in Australia by passenger traffic and the main international airport serving Victoria. Additional airports in the metropolitan region include Avalon Airport, which handles domestic and international passenger services and freight operations, and Essendon Fields Airport and Moorabbin Airport, both of which are major centers for general aviation and flight training. The region also includes smaller airports and airfields used for recreational flying, aviation training, and emergency services.

Historically, aviation in Melbourne developed around Essendon Airport, which served as the city’s main commercial airport until the opening of Melbourne Airport in 1970. Today the broader Melbourne area maintains a network of airports that collectively support commercial aviation, general aviation, and military aviation needs.

== Main airports ==
The following are the four airports that offer regularly scheduled passenger flights.

- Melbourne Airport (IATA: MEL, ICAO: YMML) is located in Tullamarine to the north-west of the city, adjacent to the northern end of the Tullamarine Freeway. It is Melbourne's major international airport. In terms of scheduled flights, it is by far the busiest airport serving the city, with domestic flights to all of the five other states and two main territories of Australia, as well as international services to Africa, Europe, Asia, Oceania, North America and South America. The airport is a major hub for both Qantas and Virgin Australia, and is the home base for Jetstar Airways and cargo airlines Qantas Freight and Team Global Express. In the twelve months of 1 July 2024 to 30 June 2025 it was the only major airport in Australia to have no helicopter flights.
- Avalon Airport (IATA: AVV, ICAO: YMAV) is located to the south-west, outside the city of Geelong, and is the next most prominent airport for Jetstar; in the early years of the airline, all of its Melbourne operations were at Avalon.
- Essendon Fields Airport (IATA: MEB, ICAO: YMEN) is located in the middle north-west of the city adjacent to the Tullamarine Freeway, the same road that leads from the centre of Melbourne to Melbourne Airport (which is approximately 7 kilometres (4 mi) farther away); it was formerly the primary airport for the city, until Melbourne Airport opened in 1970. It is now limited to a handful of regional passenger airlines and is primarily used for general aviation and domestic cargo flights. It is the main base for business jets and emergency services aircraft in Melbourne.
- Moorabbin Airport (IATA: MBW, ICAO: YMMB) is located in the middle southern suburbs and offers a limited number of passenger flights but is the primary general aviation airport in the city. In the twelve months of 1 July 2024 to 30 June 2025, it was the busiest of Melbourne’s airports in terms of movements (takeoffs or landings) - a few dozen less than 252,000 recorded, surpassing Melbourne Airport by more than 14,000 movements (237,240) and Essendon by more than 203,000 (48,318 movements); (Note: Movements at an airport are recorded during the hours of operation of the airport’s control tower; although Moorabbin Airport operates 24 hours a day, its control tower is closed 10-13 hours a day, depending on the day of the week and time of the year. The tower at Melbourne Airport is open 24 hours a day and also controls movements at Essendon Airport when its tower is closed; thus all movements at those two airports are recorded, but not all movements at Moorabbin.) and was the second-busiest airport in Australia, after Sydney Airport.

== Other airports ==
- Coldstream Airport (ICAO: YCEM) located in Melbourne's scenic Yarra Valley. The airport is a part of Coldstream and was established in 1962 on the Doake Family property; it is a centre for pilot and aviation engineering training and aviation social activities. It provides charter and scenic flights throughout the state and is a base for aerial fire-fighting services.
- Lilydale Airport (ICAO: YLIL) is located in the Yarra Valley near Yarra Glen and is less than 10 kilometres (6 mi) by road from Coldstream Airport. In operation since 1968, Lilydale caters for a large number of pilot training flights, 'joyflights', and passenger flights to various parts of the Alpine region.
- The airport at RAAF Point Cook, formally known as RAAF Base Point Cook Aerodrome (ICAO: YMPC), is located at Point Cook, and is the spiritual home of the Royal Australian Air Force (RAAF). Established before World War I, it is the oldest continuously operating military airfield in the world, and is currently utilised by Training schools, clubs and the RAAF Museum.

== List ==
Community	Airport name	Type	ICAO	IATA	Coordinates
Avalon	Avalon Airport	Public	YMAV	AVV	38°02′22″S 144°28′10″E
Coldstream	Coldstream Airport	Private	YCEM		37°43′42″S 145°24′30″E
Essendon	Essendon Fields Airport	Public	YMEN	MEB	37°43′41″S 144°54′07″E
Lilydale	Lilydale Airport	Private	YLIL		37°41′30″S 145°22′00″E
Moorabbin	Moorabbin Airport	Public	YMMB	MBW	37°58′33″S 145°06′08″E
Point Cook	RAAF Point Cook	Military	YMPC		37°55′54″S 144°45′12″E
Melbourne Airport	Melbourne Airport	Public	YMML	MEL	37°40′24″S 144°50′36″E

== See also ==
- Tyabb Airport - approximately 70 kilometres (43 mi) by road south of Melbourne city centre
- List of airports in Victoria
