= Ambulance Victoria =

State ambulance service

Agency overview
- Formed: 1 July 2008; 18 years ago
- Preceding agencies: Metropolitan Ambulance Service; Rural Ambulance Victoria; Alexandra District Ambulance Service
- Jurisdiction: Victoria
- Headquarters: Doncaster, Victoria, Australia
- Employees: 4,123
- Annual budget: ▲ A$1.52 billion (2025–26)
- Minister responsible: Mary-Anne Thomas, Minister for Ambulance Services
- Agency executive: Jordan Emery, Chief Executive Officer
- Parent agency: Department of Health
- Key document: Ambulance Services Act 1986
- Website: ambulance.vic.gov.au

Ambulance Victoria (AV) is the state ambulance service for Victoria, Australia, and a statutory agency of the Department of Health. AV provides pre-hospital emergency care and ambulance services throughout Victoria and some border towns. Ambulance Victoria was formed on 1 July 2008 with the merger of the Metropolitan Ambulance Service (MAS), Rural Ambulance Victoria (RAV), and the Alexandra District Ambulance Service (ADAS).

Ambulance Victoria provides emergency medical response to more than 5.9 million people in an area of more than 227,000 square kilometres. During 2015–2016, Ambulance Victoria responded to 843,051 cases.

The service is funded by fees for the cost of transport and treatment by paramedics, with paid memberships entitling holders to free services. Private health insurance or compensation providers such as the Transport Accident Commission or WorkCover may cover out-of-pocket costs, however Australia's universal health insurance scheme (Medicare) does not fund ambulance services.

== History ==
A formal ambulance service began in Victoria in 1883. Over the years services were provided by St John Ambulance, Civil Ambulance Service and a multitude local area ambulance services.

In the 1980s the Metropolitan Ambulance Service was formed from a number of smaller area services; and 16 regional services were amalgamated into five. In 1997, the rural services were consolidated to one rural service, Rural Ambulance Victoria.

On 22 April 2008, Premier John Brumby and Health Minister Daniel Andrews announced a record funding boost of over $185m, including two new helicopter services, 26 new ambulance stations and over 300 new paramedics. In addition, it was announced that the way the state's ambulance services work was to be changed with Metropolitan Ambulance Service and Rural Ambulance Victoria becoming one organisation, Ambulance Victoria. On 26 May this decision was confirmed, with the consolidated service commencing operation on 1 July 2008.

== Overview ==
Ambulance Victoria is required under the Ambulance Services Act 1986 (Vic) to respond rapidly to requests for help in a medical emergency; provide specialised medical skills to maintain life and to reduce injuries in emergency situations and while transporting patients; provide specialised transport facilities to move people requiring emergency medical treatment; provide services for which specialised medical or transport skills are necessary and foster public education in first aid.

Ambulance Victoria's primary function is to respond to emergency incidents and its secondary function is medical transport (non-emergency) requests. Emergency Incidents are responded to by paramedics, Mobile Intensive Care Ambulance (MICA) paramedics, Air Ambulance paramedics and if in a regional area also by Ambulance Community Officers (ACO) employed on a casual basis and volunteer Community Emergency Response Team (CERT) or by Remote Area Nurse (RAN) from a bush hospital. Ambulance Victoria has more than 260 ambulance branches located across Victoria.

In 2015–2016, Ambulance Victoria's workforce was 3,438 paramedics and 578 MICA paramedics. In addition, Ambulance Victoria employed 723 casual ACO and there were 357 CERT volunteers.

In the same year, Ambulance Victoria responded to 843,051 emergency and non-emergency cases including 172,960 emergency road incidents in the five rural regions, 416,887 emergency road incidents in the two metropolitan regions and 4,556 emergency air incidents (2,033 by helicopter and 2,523 by plane).

Ambulance Victoria assesses each emergency incident on receipt of the 000 call, designating the incident a code depending on the urgency/severity, and publishes its response times for each quarter of the year on the internet.

Ambulance Victoria operates a Bicycle Response Unit in pre-planned operations for public events in Melbourne with large crowds. The unit was established in the lead up to the 2006 Commonwealth Games.

In 2012, a Paramedic Motorcycle Unit was trialled in inner city Melbourne operating two Piaggio MP3 three wheeled motorbikes. The trial was successful with the BMW F700GS motorcycle selected to be the unit's motorcycle to operate in the inner Melbourne area mainly in the councils of City of Melbourne and City of Port Phillip.

== Communications ==
Ambulance Victoria's emergency and non-emergency patient transport communications are handled by Triple Zero Victoria communication centres in Ballarat, East Burwood and Williams Landing.

Ambulance communications functions include 000 Emergency call-taking, non-emergency patient transport requests, and ambulance dispatch for emergency and non-emergency vehicles. Modern emergency services communications is highly advanced, and communications staff use a wide range of technologies including digital and analogue radio, telephones, pagers, and advanced computer and GPS systems. Many emergency services vehicles, including ambulances, are fitted with mobile data terminals that enable them to view information, read messages sent by call-takers and dispatchers, and be notified of updates immediately as they become available. A number of communication services used by Ambulance Victoria, such as digital radio and mobile data terminals, are not available outside metropolitan Melbourne.

== Vehicles ==
Ambulance Victoria operates a range of vehicles:

- Mercedes-Benz Sprinter (General Ambulance/MICA Ambulance/Patient Transport/CPAV/Adult Retrieval/Mobile Stroke Unit)
- Ford Territory (Single responder/MICA Single responder)
- Toyota Kluger (MICA Support + Single Responder)
- Volkswagen Amarok (MICA Support + Single responder)
- Volkswagen Transporter (Health Command)
- Volkswagen Crafter (Patient Transport)
- BMW F700GS motorcycles (Paramedic Motorcycle Unit)
- Honda Odyssey (Medical transport for walking patients – Clinical Services)
- Toyota Land Cruiser (MICA Support + Single Responder)
- Mercedes Vito (MICA Support/Single Responder/Adult Retrieval)
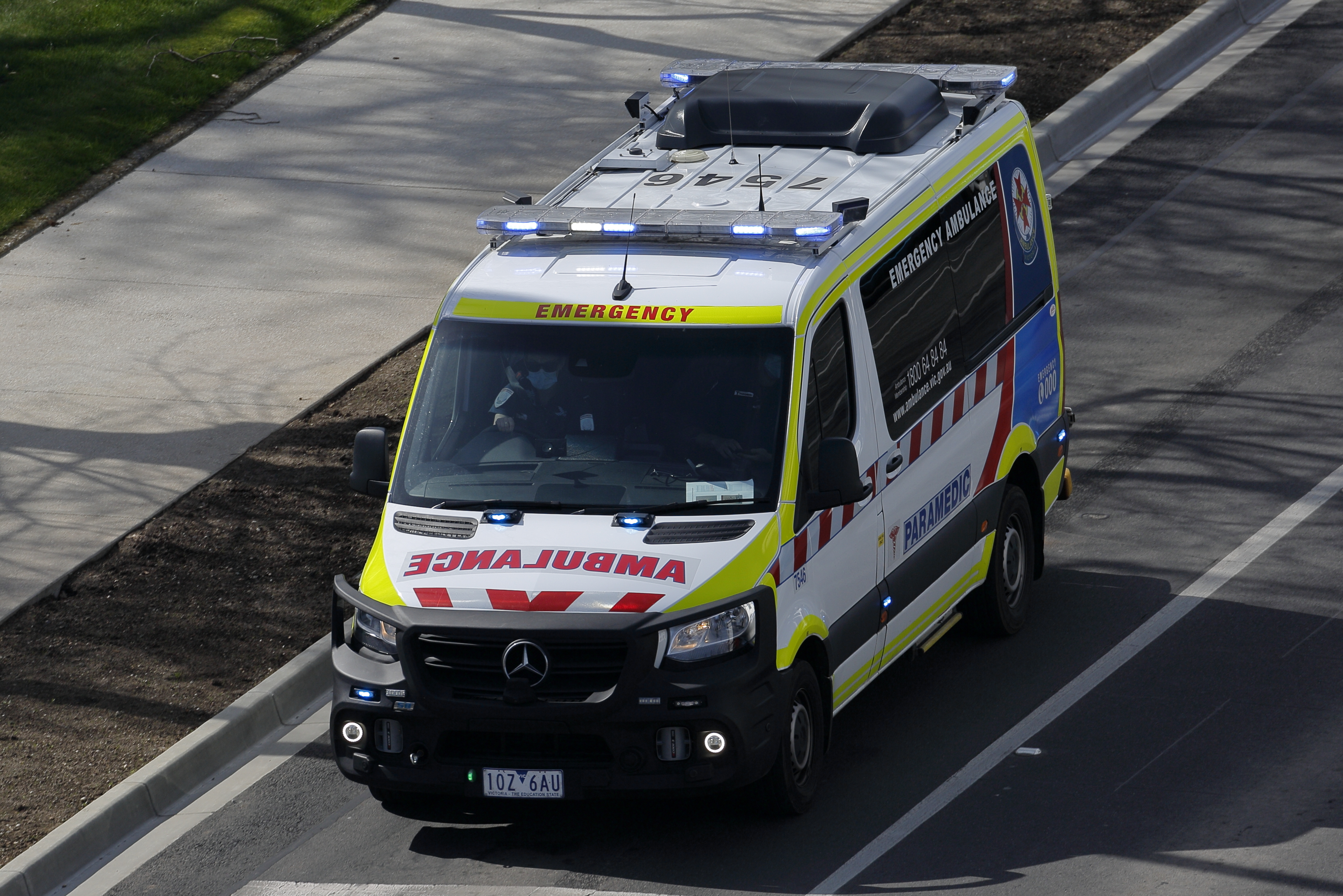
Mercedes Benz Sprinter ambulance

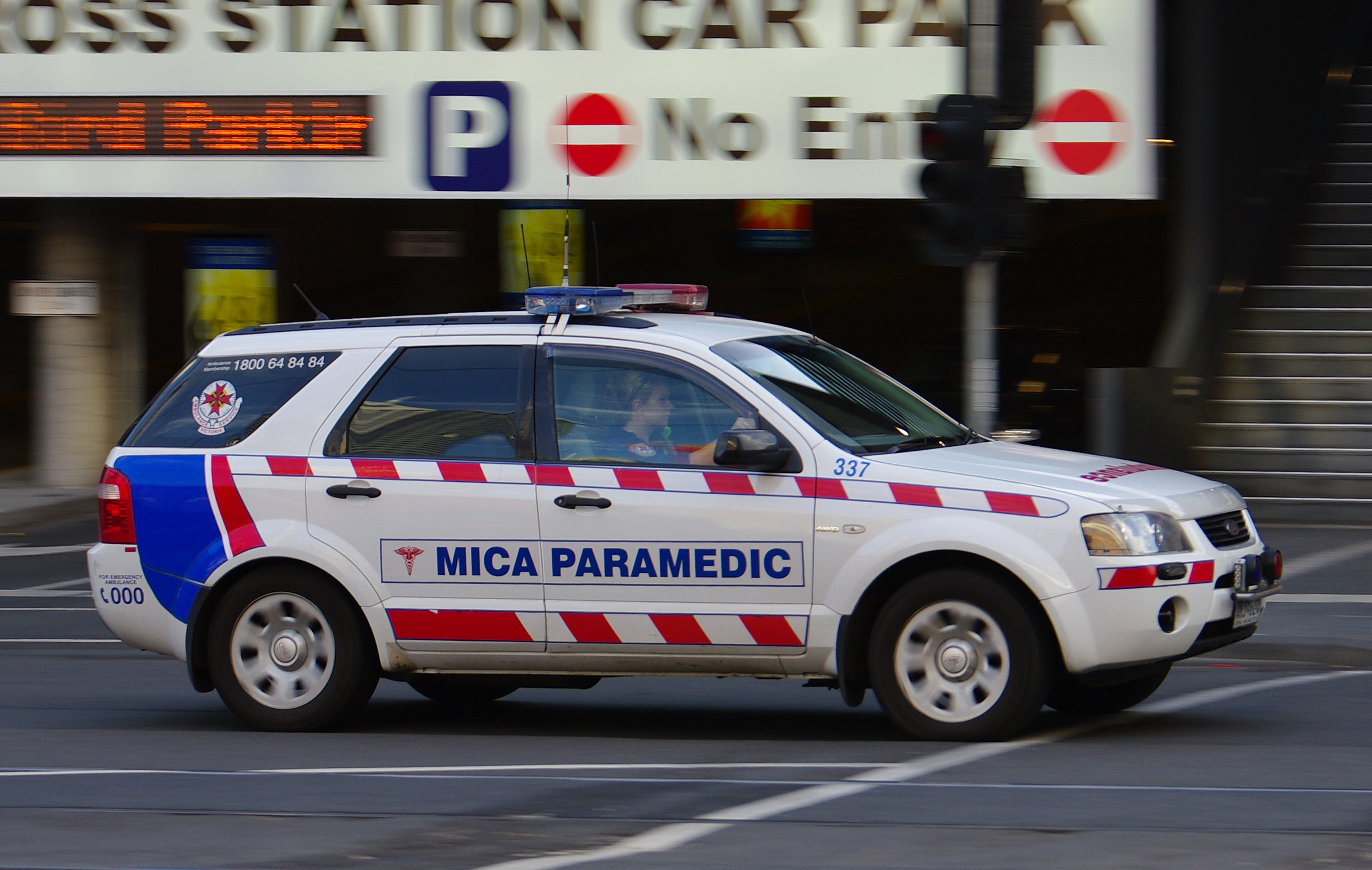
Ford Territory Mobile Intensive Care Paramedic (MICA)

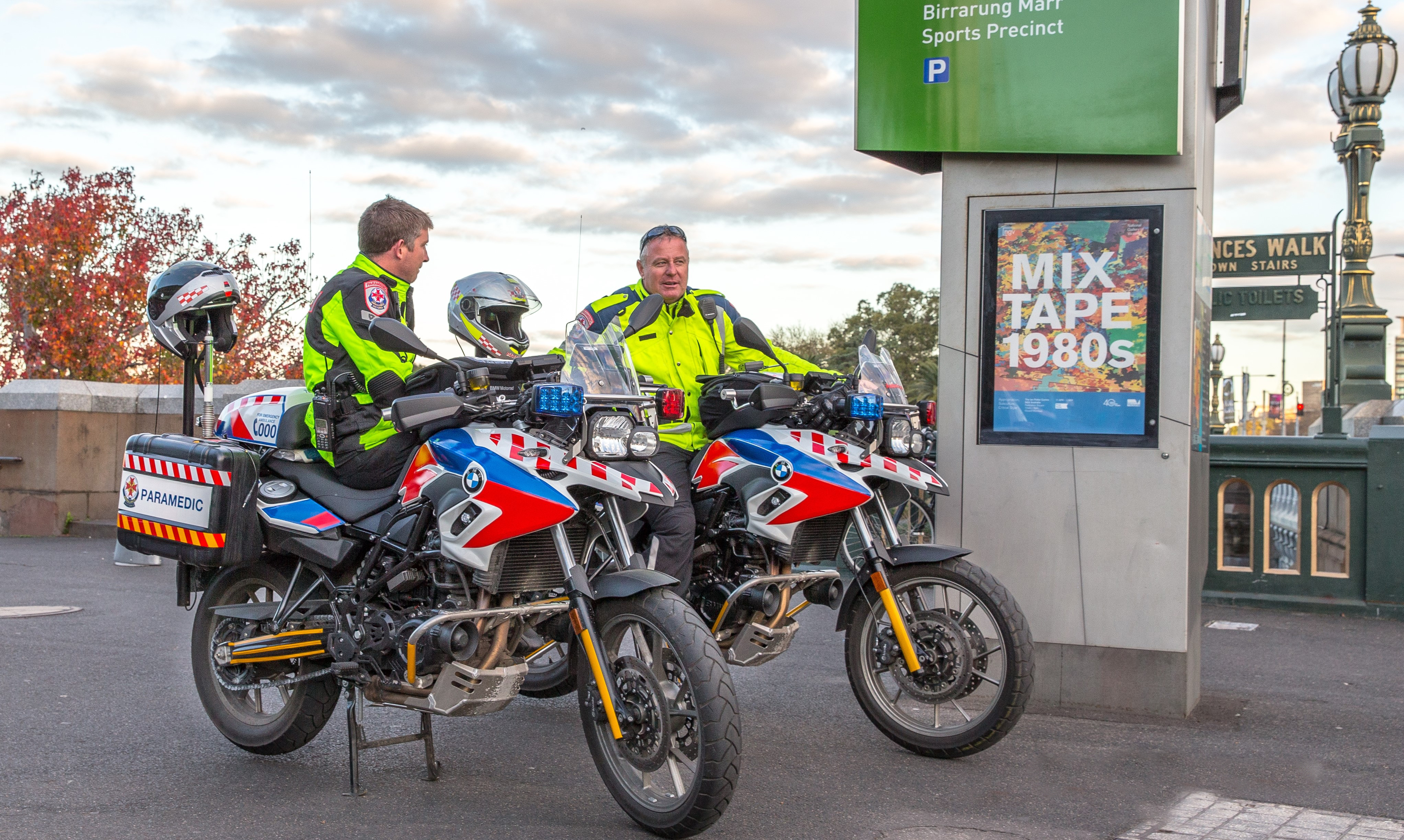
Paramedic motorcycle units

Their most common vehicle is the Mercedes-Benz Sprinter. This vehicle is the frontline vehicle for all of Victoria as they carry one patient at a time with loads of medical equipment, which is usually staffed by two paramedics. There are also different models including models with bull bars/push bumpers for better use in rural areas. AV also operates Mobile Intensive Care Ambulances which are staffed by more specially trained paramedics and different equipment. They also operate Non-Emergency Patient Transport Ambulances (NEPT) and Clinical Transport Services units (CTS). For more complex patients, AV has Complex Patient Ambulance Vehicles (CPAV) and Adult Retrieval Services (AR) both are similar to the standard general ambulances. The CPAV units include a lift platform at the back instead of regular doors, the AR unit has more specialist equipment.

Introduced in 2017, AV teamed up with The Royal Melbourne Hospital, the Stroke Foundation and numerous other agencies to create a $7 Million Mobile Stroke Unit Ambulance (MSU). The state-of-the-art vehicle include specialist equipment tailored to stroke patients. In the ambulance is a built-in CT-Scanner. Two paramedics staff the ambulance (including a MICA paramedic), a CT radiographer, a stroke neurologist and a stroke nurse specialist. The first MSU is currently running as car 6600. In 2020, it was announced that AV would commence building a next generation Stroke Ambulance otherwise known as MSU-2

== Air Ambulance Victoria ==
Ambulance Victoria has a fleet of helicopters and fixed wing aircraft operated by Air Ambulance Victoria (AAV) based out of Essendon Airport in Melbourne with helicopters strategically placed in regional Victoria. In addition, the helicopters respond to search and rescue incidents, able to utilise the winch, including sea rescues.

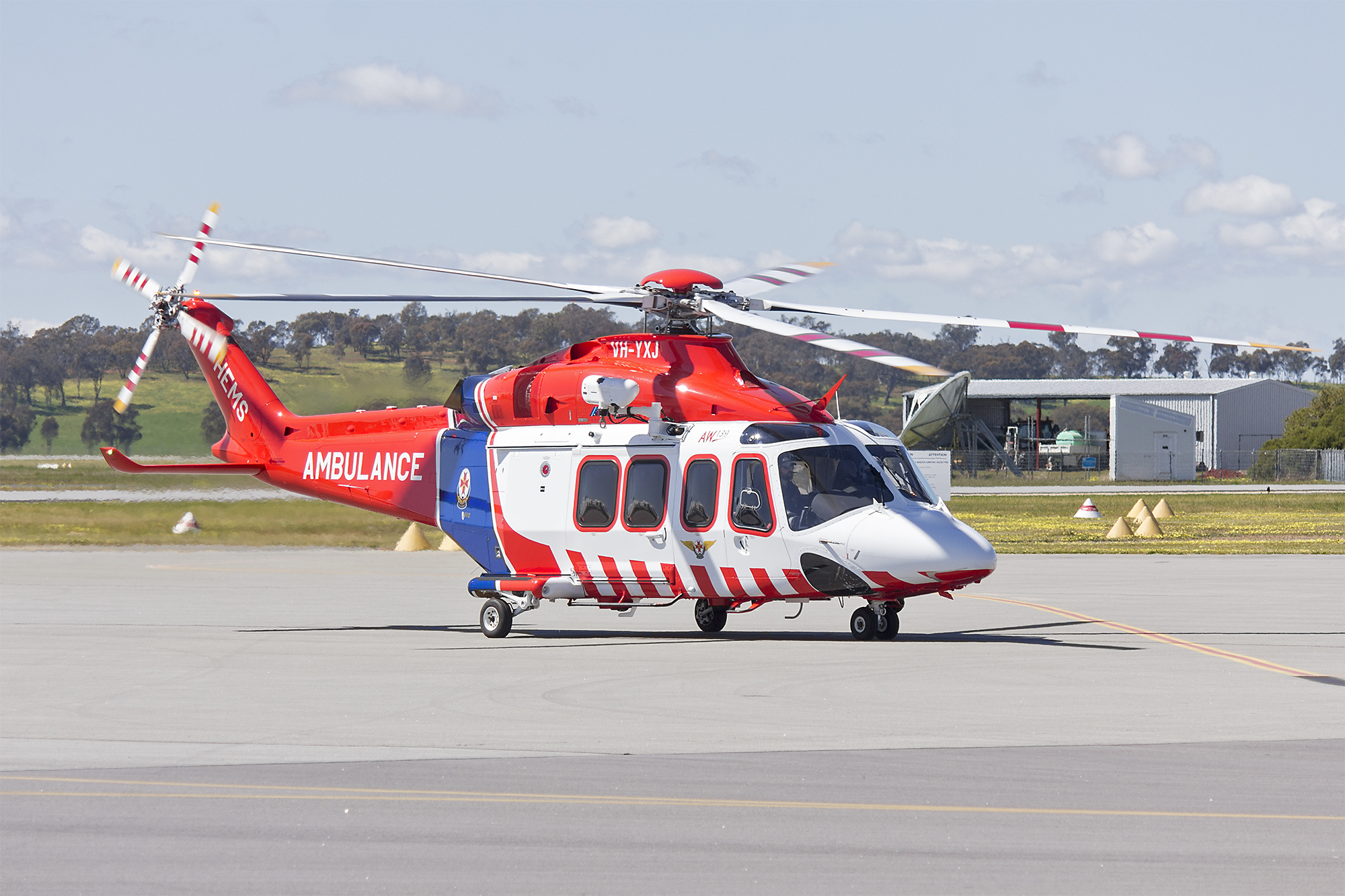
Augusta Westland AW139

=== Helicopters ===
AAV operates six twin engine AgustaWestland AW139 helicopters provided by Babcock Mission Critical Services Australasia. Five aircraft are operational 24/7, while the sixth is on a maintenance rotation. The helicopters were introduced from 2016 to replace the four Bell 412EP helicopters and also one Eurocopter AS365N3 Dauphin helicopter that had been operated in partnership with the Victoria Police Air Wing.

The helicopters are designated HEMS (Helicopter Emergency Medical Service) and operate throughout the state:-

- HEMS 1 based at Essendon Airport.
- HEMS 2 based at La Trobe Valley Airport.
- HEMS 3 based at Bendigo Airport.
- HEMS 4 based at Warrnambool Airport.
- HEMS 5 is for primary response and specialist medical retrieval based at Essendon Airport.

Helicopter operations commenced in 1970 with a Bell 206A JetRanger known as the 'Angel of Mercy' based on the Mornington Peninsula operated from Tyabb Airport. In 1980, a Hughes 500D was operated in the La Trobe Valley, later a Bell 206 Long Ranger and from 1985 a Bell 412 known as Helimed 1 later renamed to HEMS 2. In 1986, AAV entered a partnership with the Victoria Police Air Wing to use a Eurocopter AS365 Dauphin which would respond to both police and ambulance incidents with ambulance given priority known as HEMS 1 and replacing the 'Angel of Mercy'. Two helicopters were configured for the aeromedical role with one as a spare. In 2001, a Bell 412EP was operated from Bendigo airport known as HEMS 3. In 2009, a Bell 412EP was operated from Warrnambool Airport known as HEMS 4 and a second Bell 412EP was operated from Essendon known as HEMS 5 to transport critically ill patients from rural hospitals to Melbourne. In January 2017, the final of the five new AgustaWestland AW139s entered service replacing the Victoria Police Eurocopter AS365 Dauphin and ending the partnership. The aircraft are staffed by MICA Flight Paramedics who are trained to administer blood, conduct ultrasounds, complete complex procedures and perform winch rescues.

=== Fixed-wing aircraft ===
AAV now operate two Beechcraft Super King Air B260C's, and two Beechcraft Super King Air B360C's following the retirement of the older fleet of B200's in March 2025. The new aircraft are provided by Toll Aviation, and are capable of reaching most of Victoria within an hour. They are used mainly for transporting patients from rural towns to the major hospitals in Melbourne and can carry two stretcher patients and two walking patients. This service includes bringing people to Melbourne for regular treatments such as oncology and dialysis while also facilitating acute medical conditions requiring surgery or the transfer of injured patients from rural hospitals to specialist care. The service now reaches to more than 86 towns within Victoria while also servicing southern New South Wales, northern Tasmania and some parts of South Australia. The aircraft are typically staffed by advanced life support (ALS) paramedics.

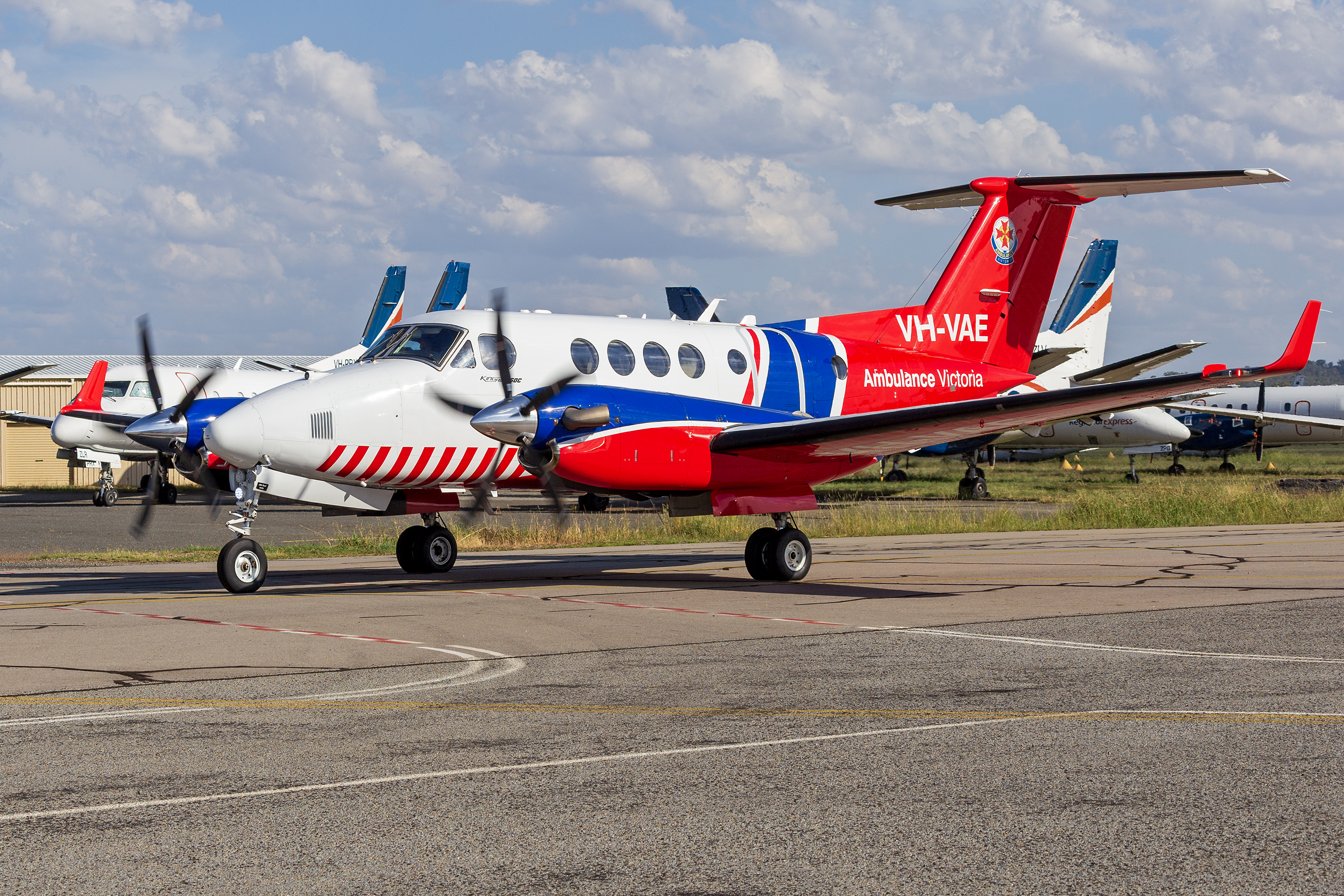
One of two Beechcraft B260C King Air operated by Toll Aviation at Wagga Wagga

== Bullying, Harassment and Sexual Assault in Ambulance Victoria ==
=== Victorian Auditor-General Audit into Bullying and Harassment in the Health Sector 2016 ===
On 23 March 2016, the Victorian Auditor-General tabled a damning report into "Bullying and Harassment in the Health Sector". Ambulance Victoria was one of four Government Health Bodies that was audited as part of this report.

As part of the audit, the Auditor General looked at the background of the issue, workplace culture, preventing bullying and harassment, responding to bullying and harassment and sector-wide collaboration and support.

==== Key Findings from the Audit into Bullying and Harassment in the Health Sector ====
Key findings from the audit included:

1. "[Dr Peter Frost – Victorian Auditor-General] found that health sector agencies are failing to respond effectively to bullying and harassment as a serious OHS risk."
2. "... The audited agencies do not understand the extent, causes or impact of bullying and harassment in their respective organisations, even when such issues have resulted in significant media attention and reputational damage."
3. "Audited agencies also do not have the fundamental, underpinning foundations of effective policies and procedures, and do not adequately train their staff and managers to deal with inappropriate behaviours to prevent them escalating into serious bullying and harassment."
4. "... when issues become serious bullying and harassment matters these agencies do not have the appropriate procedures to manage them or document the details to help inform future planning and action."

==== Ambulance Victoria's Response to the Victorian Auditor-General Audit into Bullying and Harassment in the Health Sector 2016 ====
On 15 March 2016, chairman of the Board of Directors, Mr Ken Lay, AO, APM, acknowledged of the Audit and committed the Organisation to accepting all the recommendations of the Audit through the Ambulance and Policy Consultative Committee. Part of Mr Lay's response included "achieve[ing] sustainable culture change within Ambulance Victoria."

=== Allegations made public ===
On 26 October 2020, Allegations of widespread bullying, harassment and gross misconduct were public reported by The Age after 13 Paramedics raised an open letter to Mr Ken Lay, chairman of the board of directors.

==== Allegations made about unlawful activities by Ambulance Victoria Employees ====
The Age noted that:

- Paramedics reported "active discrimination and instances of abuse in our workplace".
- The "fear of retribution is rife and stops people speaking up about what they have seen".
- "sex-based maltreatment and the lack of redress has caused them serious mental health issues, including suicidal ideation."
- "12 Ambulance Victoria employees have reported rape or attempted rape or sexual assault at work, and two men have been referred to Victoria Police by the organisation for the alleged sexual assault of colleagues."

==== Ambulance Victoria commissioned review by The Victorian Equal Opportunity and Human Rights Commission ====
On 27 October 2020, the Victorian Equal Opportunity and Human Rights Commission announced that it had been asked to conduct a review into allegations of unlawful, discriminatory behaviour at Ambulance Victoria by. On 30 November 2020, The Commission released the terms of reference for its review of Ambulance Victoria. Throughout the process, the commission has provided public updates regarding the review.

On 20 September 2021, The commission announced that the review would be released in two Volumes "in large part due to the higher than anticipated number of people who came forward to share their experiences and views with the Commission."

- Volume 1 was released on 30 November 2021.
- Volume 2 is set to be published in March 2022.

=== Volume 1 ===
Volume 1 was released on 30 November 2021 by The commission.

==== Volume 1 Key Themes ====
Key Themes noted by The Commissions included;

- "...AV's approach to preventing discrimination, sexual harassment, bullying and victimisation is still maturing and it is not complying fully with the positive duty in the Act."
- "47.2% of survey respondents reported experiencing discrimination, 17.4% reported experiencing sexual harassment, 52.4% reported experiencing bullying and 34.5% reporting experiencing victimisation"
- "We [The Commission] commonly heard that mental ill-health and stress followed unlawful conduct."
- "one participant shared in their written submission: 'Who would’ve guessed the most traumatic thing I’ve experienced and witnessed as a [P]aramedic was workplace behaviour?'"

==== Recommendations from Volume 1 ====
1. establishing an independent restorative engagement scheme
2. adopting a new set of organisational values
3. developing a comprehensive prevention plan
4. establishing a new organisational model for responding to reports and complaints
5. introducing anonymous reporting pathways
6. undertaking a security audit of isolated work environments
7. embedding a more structured approach to encouraging bystander action

==== Ambulance Victoria's Response ====
On 30 November 2021, The Commission noted that Ambulance Victoria had accepted all recommendations.

=== Volume 2 ===
Volume 2 was released in March 2022 by the commission.

=== Ongoing concerns by Ambulance Victoria Staff ===
On 29 November 2021, almost a one-year after the allegations were first publicly raised, a number of Ambulance Victoria Employees, had reported that "in some cases victimisation has worsened since the inquiry began." The Age also reported that "[One] person is well known to the executive level as a problem, for at least 10 years. He is a direct threat ... but management are not listening."

== See also ==
- Paramedics in Australia
- Ambulance
- Paramedic
