= Geelong Airport =

Former airfield in Victoria, Australia

- IATA: GEX; ICAO: YGLG

Summary
- Airport type: Public
- Serves: Geelong
- Location: Grovedale
- Elevation AMSL: 140 ft / 43 m
- Coordinates: 38°13′31″S 144°19′59″E

Map
- Location in Victoria

Runways
Direction	Length		Surface
Direction	m	ft	Surface
09/27			Gravel
18/36			Asphalt
- ReferenceYGLG – Perth (PDF). AIP En Route Supplement from Airservices Australia, effective 19 March 2026

Geelong Airport (IATA: GEX, ICAO: YGLG) was a small airfield specifically for light aircraft located in Mount Duneed, Victoria, Australia. It was primarily used for scenic flights and private aircraft, and was located in the local government area of the City of Greater Geelong.

The airport contained two gravel/tarmac runways: north/south and east/west. Though commercial airlines had attempted to fly services to Geelong in the past, they chose to use the more developed airport at Avalon, located to the south-west of Melbourne. Operations from Avalon also proved to be unsuccessful. Other airports in the area are at Barwon Heads (ICAO: YBRS), the Torquay Airport and the Tiger Moth World at 325 Blackgate Rd.

The site is also used to record wind and weather measurements for the area. Geelong airport was sold to property developers to allow for the expansion of the urban sprawl of Geelong. The airport closed on 31 December 2011.

Since 2011 closure and later redevelopment, only the former office building and a hangar remained. While the hangar has been retained for future use, the office building, although repainted, was allowed to decay and became a target for vandalism. On 10 September 2022, a suspicious fire damaged the office building beyond repair. It was demolished a month later.

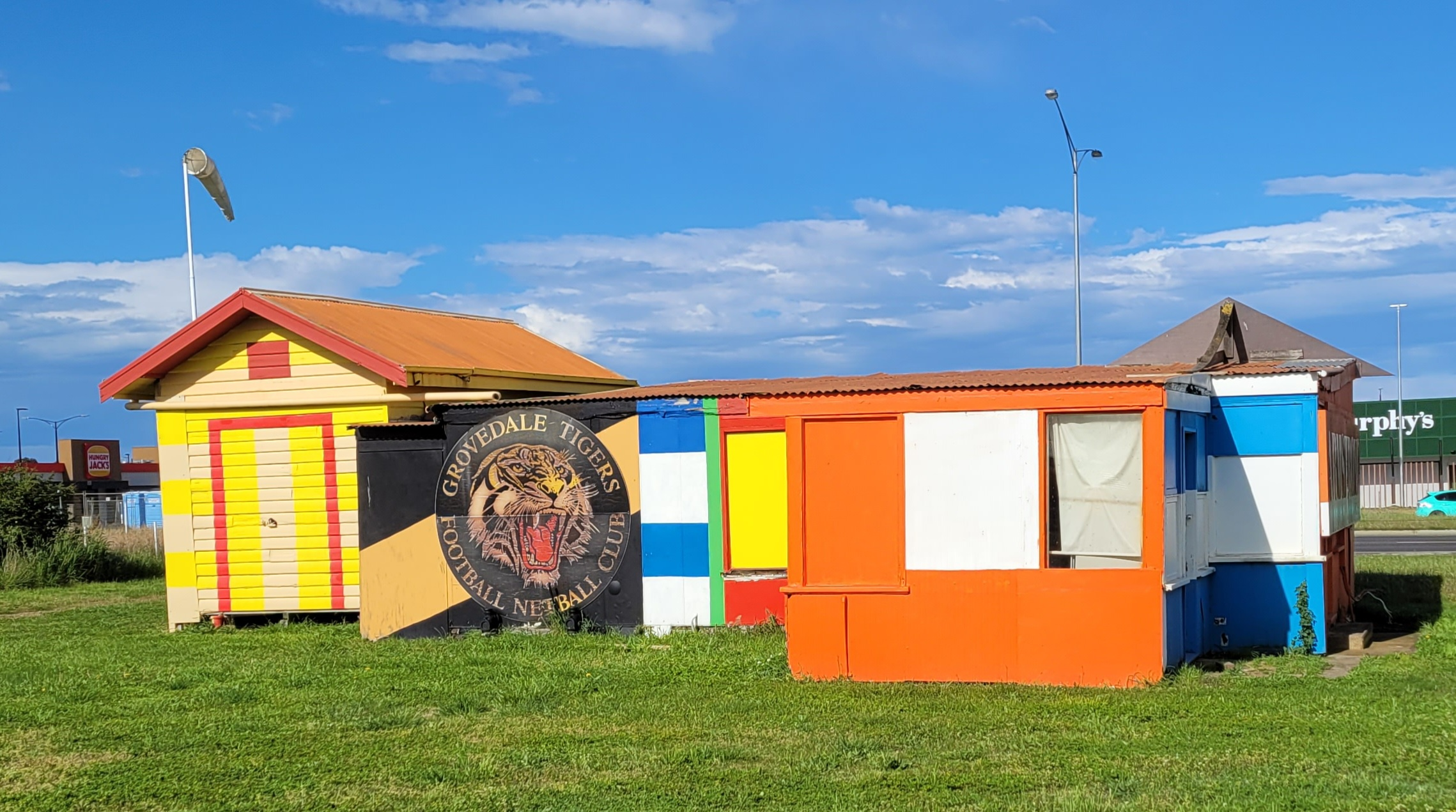
The former Geelong Airport office in October 2021

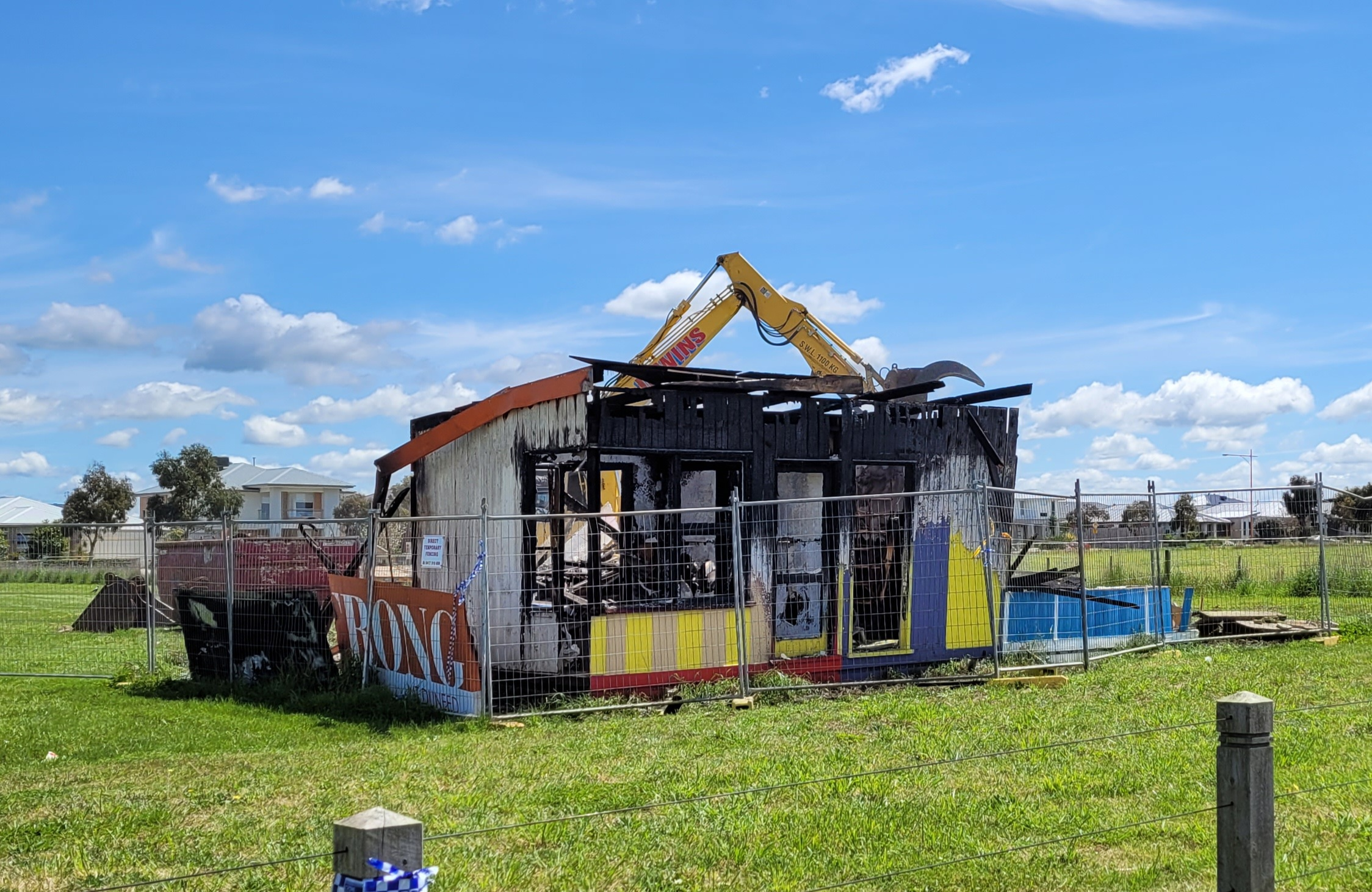
The former Geelong Airport office under demolition in October 2022.

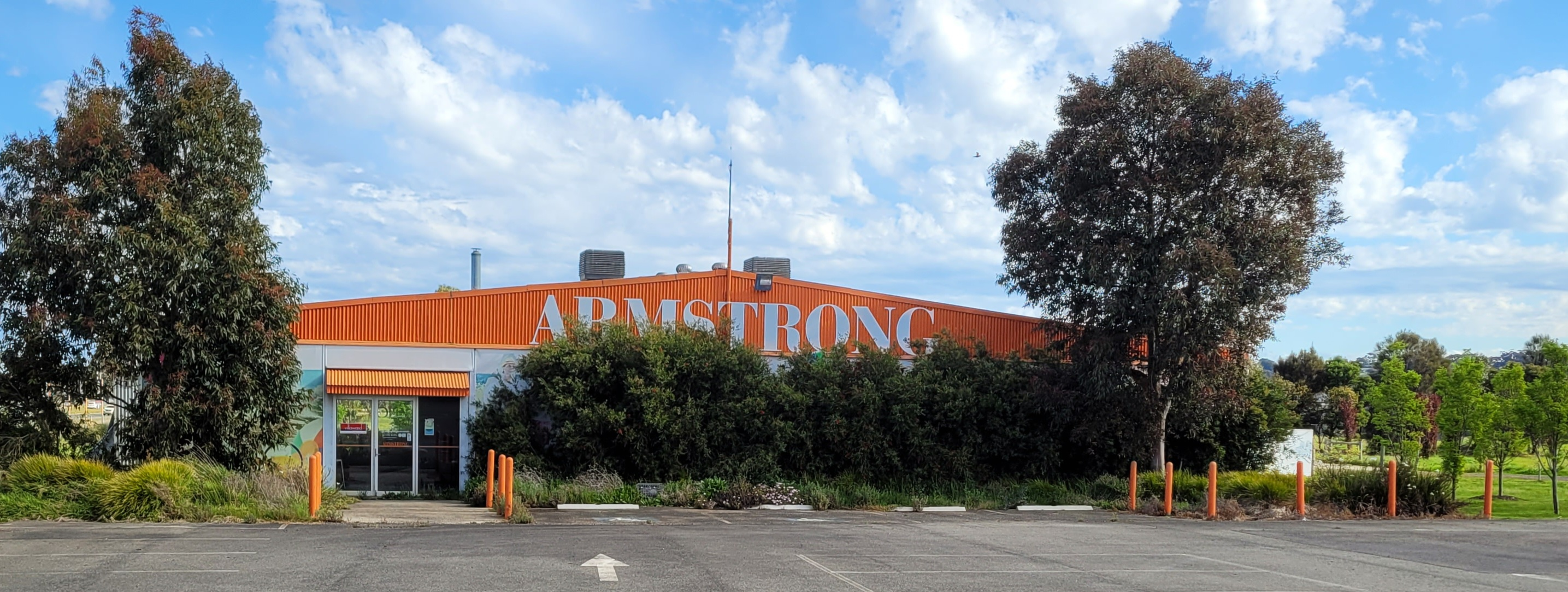
The former Geelong Airport hangar building in October 2021.

== See also ==
- List of airports in Victoria
- Transportation in Australia
