= Yarrawonga (disambiguation) =

Yarrawonga is the name of several Australian places:

- Yarrawonga, Northern Territory, an industrial suburb of Palmerston, Northern Territory
- Yarrawonga, Queensland, a suburb of Townsville, Queensland
- Yarrawonga, Victoria, a town in northern Victoria
  - Yarrawonga Airport

== See also ==
- Yarrawonga Park, New South Wales
