= Nhill (disambiguation) =

Nhill may refer to:

- Nhill, Victoria, a town
  - Nhill railway station
  - Nhill Airport
- Nhill (crater), Mars
