= SWH =

SWH may refer to:

- Sai Wan Ho station, Hong Kong, MTR station code SWH
- Sapir–Whorf hypothesis that the structure of a language affects the ways in which its speakers conceptualize their world.
- Significant wave height, in physical oceanography, the mean wave height (trough to crest) of the highest third of the waves.
- Solar water heating
- Spot World Heritage, a satellite data distribution scheme.
- Software Heritage
- Swan Hill Airport, IATA airport code "SWH"
- Swan Hill railway station, Australia
