= Leongatha Airport =

- IATA: none; ICAO: YLEG

Summary
- Airport type: Public
- Operator: Leongatha Aerodrome Users Pty Ltd
- Location: Leongatha, Victoria
- Elevation AMSL: 263 ft / 80 m
- Coordinates: 38°29′42″S 145°51′36″E

Map
- Location in Victoria

Runways
Direction	Length		Surface
Direction	m	ft	Surface
04/22	924	3,031	Asphalt
18/36	669	2,195	Gravel
- Sources: AIP

Leongatha Airport (ICAO: YLEG) is located 3.5 nautical miles (6.5 km; 4.0 mi) southwest of Leongatha, Victoria, Australia.

== See also ==
- List of airports in Victoria, Australia
