= Donald Airport =

- IATA: none; ICAO: YDOD

Summary
- Airport type: Public
- Operator: Buloke Shire Council
- Location: Donald, Victoria
- Elevation AMSL: 409 ft / 125 m
- Coordinates: 36°21′36″S 143°00′24″E

Map
- Location in Victoria

Runways
| Direction | Length | | Surface |
| Direction | m | ft | Surface |
|---|---|---|---|
| 09/27 | 1,166 | 3,825 | Asphalt |
| 18/36 | 788 | 2,585 | Grass |
- Sources: Australian AIP

Donald Airport (ICAO: YDOD) is located at Donald, Victoria, Australia.

== See also ==
- List of airports in Victoria, Australia
