= Kerang Airport =

- IATA: KRA; ICAO: YKER

Summary
- Airport type: Public
- Operator: Gannawarra Shire Council
- Location: Kerang, Victoria
- Elevation AMSL: 254 ft / 77 m
- Coordinates: 35°44′50″S 143°56′06″E

Map
- Location in Victoria

Runways
Direction	Length		Surface
Direction	ft	m	Surface
05/23	2,267	691	Gravel
14/32		1,067	Asphalt
- Sources: AIP

Kerang Airport (IATA: KRA, ICAO: YKER) is located 1.5 nautical miles (2.8 km; 1.7 mi) southeast of Kerang, Victoria, Australia.

== See also ==
- List of airports in Victoria, Australia
