= Stawell Airport =

Airport in Stawell, Victoria, Australia

- IATA: SWC; ICAO: YSWL

Summary
- Airport type: Public
- Operator: Stawell Aerodrome Committee, Northern Grampians Shire Council
- Location: Stawell, Victoria
- Elevation AMSL: 807 ft / 246 m
- Coordinates: 37°04′15″S 142°44′29″E

Map
- Location in Victoria

Runways
Direction	Length		Surface
Direction	m	ft	Surface
11/29	1,403	4,603	Asphalt
18/36	854	2,802	Asphalt
- Sources: AIP

Stawell Airport (IATA: SWC, ICAO: YSWL) is located 2 nautical miles (3.7 km; 2.3 mi) southwest of Stawell, Victoria, Australia on Grampians Road.

== See also ==
- List of airports in Victoria, Australia
