= Saint Arnaud Airport =

Airport in Victoria, Australia

- IATA: none; ICAO: YSTA

Summary
- Airport type: Public
- Operator: Northern Grampian Shire Council
- Location: St Arnaud, Victoria
- Elevation AMSL: 639 ft / 195 m
- Coordinates: 36°38′12″S 143°11′12″E

Map
- Location in Victoria

Runways
| Direction | Length | | Surface |
| Direction | m | ft | Surface |
|---|---|---|---|
| 18/36 | 999 | 3,278 | Asphalt |
| 09/27 | 533 | 1,749 | Gravel |
- Sources: Australian AIP

Saint Arnaud Airport (ICAO: YSTA) is located at St Arnaud, Victoria, Australia.

== See also ==
- List of airports in Victoria, Australia
