= Portland Airport (Victoria) =

Airport in Portland, Victoria, Australia

- IATA: PTJ; ICAO: YPOD

Summary
- Airport type: Public
- Operator: Glenelg Shire Council
- Location: Portland, Victoria
- Elevation AMSL: 265 ft / 81 m
- Coordinates: 38°19′05″S 141°28′16″E
- Website: flyportlandairport.com

Map
- Location in Victoria

Runways
Direction	Length		Surface
Direction	m	ft	Surface
08/26	1,616	5,302	Asphalt
17/35	1,180	3,871	Gravel

Statistics (2014)
- Passengers: 7,405
- Aircraft Movements: 1,142
- Sources: Australian AIP and aerodrome chart and Bureau of Infrastructure, Transport and Regional Economics

Portland Airport (IATA: PTJ, ICAO: YPOD) is located within the locality of Cashmore, 7 nautical miles (13 km; 8.1 mi) northwest of Portland, Victoria, Australia. Opened in 1982, the airport is one of only three in the state outside Melbourne to receive regular passenger services, providing an important gateway for southwest Victoria. The airport is home to the Portland Aero Club and was previously a maintenance base of Sharp Airlines. From 2009 onwards, the Victorian Government contributed funding for works to modernize the airport, including upgrade the airport's aprons, taxiways and terminal building, completed in 2014.

== Airport facilities ==
Portland airport has two runways. The primary runway, 08/26 (1,616 m × 30 m (5,302 ft × 98 ft)) is sealed and equipped with both precision approach path indicators (PAPIs) at each end and Pilot Controlled Lighting which can be turned on and off by radio as required. Fuel and aircraft maintenance facilities are available. There is no control tower and pilots are required to co-ordinate aircraft movements using a Common Traffic Advisory Frequency (CTAF), while weather information is available on a discreet frequency. Airservices Australia maintain the Portland NDB navigation aid on the airport grounds.

== Airlines and destinations ==
Since peaking at 14,436 passengers carried in 2010, passenger numbers through Portland airport have steadily declined. Between 2009 and 2013, Sharp Airlines linked the town with Adelaide, South Australia and Avalon Airport near Geelong, however these services have since been withdrawn.

== See also ==
- List of airports in Victoria
