= Kyneton Airport =

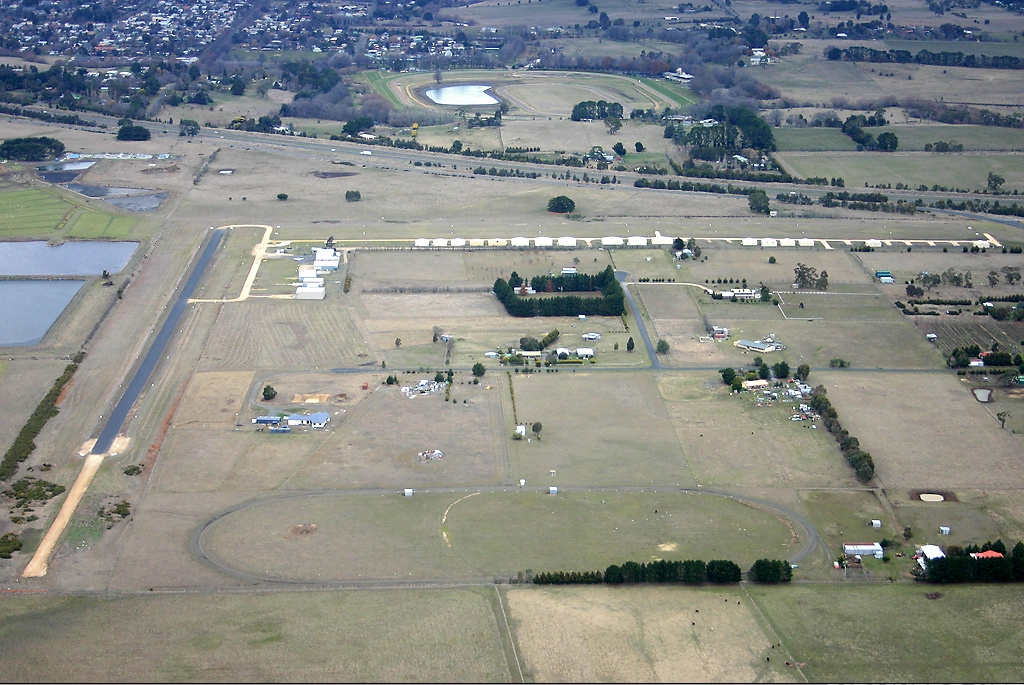
- IATA: none; ICAO: YKTN

Summary
- Airport type: Private
- Operator: Kyneton Aero Club Inc.
- Location: Kyneton, Victoria
- Elevation AMSL: 1,650 ft / 503 m
- Coordinates: 37°13′30″S 144°26′48″E

Map
- Location in Victoria

Runways
| Direction | Length | | Surface |
| Direction | m | ft | Surface |
|---|---|---|---|
| 18/36 | 703 | 2,306 | bitumen |
| 09/27 | 645 | 2,116 | grass |
- Sources: AIP

Kyneton Airport (ICAO: YKTN) is located in Kyneton, Victoria, Australia. The airfield is located 550 metres northwest of the town.

Home of the Kyneton Aero Club and the Sports Aircraft Association of Australia Chapter 20, the airfield is managed by the Kyneton Aero Club on behalf of the Shire of Macedon Ranges.

== See also ==
- List of airports in Victoria, Australia
