= Wycheproof Airport =

- IATA: none; ICAO: YWYF

Summary
- Airport type: Public
- Operator: Buloke Shire Council
- Location: Wycheproof, Victoria
- Elevation AMSL: 350 ft / 107 m
- Coordinates: 36°03′30″S 143°14′24″E

Map
- Location in Victoria

Runways
Direction	Length		Surface
Direction	m	ft	Surface
17/35	1,032	3,386	Clay
08/26	718	2,356	Clay
- Sources: Australian AIP

Wycheproof Airport (ICAO: YWYF) is located at Wycheproof, Victoria, Australia.

== See also ==
- List of airports in Victoria, Australia
