= Wangaratta Airport =

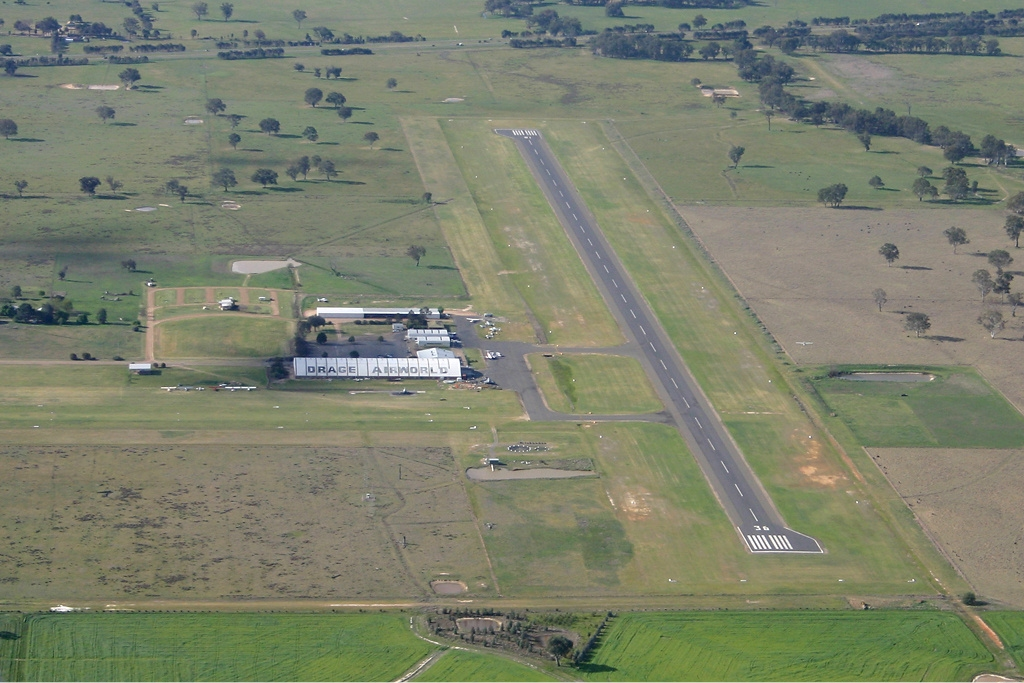
- IATA: WGT; ICAO: YWGT

Summary
- Airport type: Public
- Operator: Rural City of Wangaratta
- Location: Wangaratta, Victoria
- Elevation AMSL: 504 ft / 154 m
- Coordinates: 36.4177°S 146.3053°E

Map
- Location in Victoria

Runways
Direction	Length		Surface
Direction	m	ft	Surface
09/27	530	1,739	Grass
18/36	1,640	5,381	Asphalt
- Sources: Australian AIP and aerodrome chart

Wangaratta Airport (IATA: WGT, ICAO: YWGT) is located about 5 km (3.1 mi) south of Wangaratta, Victoria, Australia just off the Hume Highway. It provides for general aviation, maintenance, an aero club, emergency services and occasional RAAF flights.

As of 2024, the airport was also the home base of a number of World War II-era warbirds, including a Curtis P-40 Kittyhawk and a Focke-Wulf Fw 190.

== See also ==
- List of airports in Victoria, Australia
