= Monomeith Park Airfield =

Former WWII airfield in Victoria, Australia

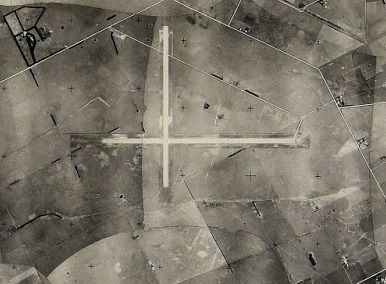
- Aerial photo of Monomeith Park Airfield in 1947
- IATA: none; ICAO: none

Summary
- Airport type: Military/Private
- Serves: Monomeith
- Location: Monomeith
- Elevation AMSL: 42 ft / 13 m
- Coordinates: 38°12′45″S 145°33′59″E

Map
- Location in Victoria

Runways
| Direction | Length | | Surface |
| Direction | ft | m | Surface |
|---|---|---|---|
| 08/26 | 6,000 | 1,829 | Gravel |
| 17/35 | 5,000 | 1,524 | Gravel |

Monomeith Park Airfield, later known as Bayles Airfield, was a Royal Australian Air Force airfield east of Monomeith, Victoria and south of Bayles, Victoria, Australia during World War II. It was constructed in 1942 as a fighter aerodrome to protect Melbourne and Yallourn, the location of the largest power station in Victoria.

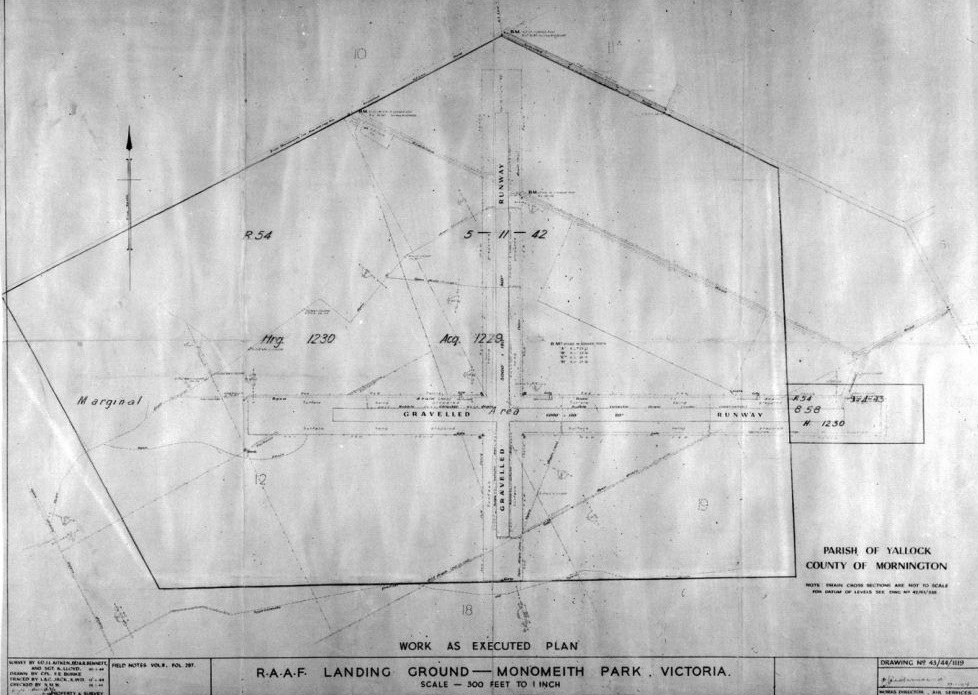
Plan of Monomeith Park Landing Ground as completed in 1943.

The site was selected in March 1942 and the land requisitioned in June of that year. During planning it was described in correspondence as RAAF Monomeith Park although it never carried the status of a base. Construction commenced in October 1942. It was originally intended to have four runways although only two were constructed as the strategic situation in the South West Pacific Area had improved by 1943. In 1944 it was downgraded to an Emergency Landing Ground with just the fenced runways retained by the RAAF. The remainder of the land was returned to the original owner for grazing.

It was no longer required after World War II and in 1946 the runways were returned to the original land owner.

After the war it was briefly known as Bayles Airfield and used for private light aircraft but the runways deteriorated quickly due to frequent flooding.

== See also ==
- List of airports in Victoria
