= Melton Airfield =

- IATA: none; ICAO: YMEL

Summary
- Airport type: Private
- Operator: E. Reeve
- Location: Melton, Victoria
- Elevation AMSL: 670 ft / 204 m
- Coordinates: 37°37′18″S 144°33′54″E

Map
- Location in Victoria

Runways
Direction	Length		Surface
Direction	m	ft	Surface
16/34	460	1,509	Turf/grass
04/22	842	2,762	Hard surface
10/28	802	2,631	Turf/grass
- Sources: Australian AIP

Melton Airfield (ICAO: YMEL) is a small grass strip airfield located approximately 5 km (3.1 mi) north of the city centre of Melton in the City of Melton, Victoria, Australia.

It is located at the intersection of Coburns Road and Diggers Rest – Coimadai Road. The small grass airstrip runs approximately east–west. The airfield is home to the Melton Air Services. It has four hangars and parking for light aircraft, an office and vehicle parking.

The airfield was established by Terry Fogarty Sr and known in the early days as "Fogarty's Field". Terry Fogarty Jr. served as a flying instructor there for many years.

== See also ==
- List of airports in Victoria
