= Robinvale Airport =

Airport in Robinvale, Victoria, Australia

- IATA: RBC; ICAO: YROI

Summary
- Airport type: Public
- Operator: Swan Hill Rural City Council
- Location: Robinvale, Victoria
- Elevation AMSL: 284 ft / 87 m
- Coordinates: 34°38′34.6″S 142°46′23″E

Map
- Location in Victoria

Runways
Direction	Length		Surface
Direction	m	ft	Surface
12/30	1,175	3,855	Grassed sand
01/19	1,140	3,740	Grass/asphalt
- Sources: AIP

Robinvale Airport (IATA: RBC, ICAO: YROI) is an airport located 3 nautical miles (5.6 km; 3.5 mi) south of Robinvale, Victoria, Australia.

== Airlines and destinations ==
Currently, no scheduled passenger services operate at the airport.

== See also ==
- List of airports in Victoria, Australia
