= Nhill Airport =

- IATA: none; ICAO: YNHL

Summary
- Airport type: Public
- Operator: Shire of Hindmarsh
- Serves: Nhill, Victoria, Australia
- Location: Nhill, Victoria
- Elevation AMSL: 454 ft / 138 m
- Coordinates: 36°18′39″S 141°38′50″E

Map
- Location in Victoria

Runways
| Direction | Length | | Surface |
| Direction | m | ft | Surface |
|---|---|---|---|
| 09/27 | 1,000 | 3,281 | Asphalt |
| 18/36 | 1,102 | 3,615 | Grass |
- Sources: Australian AIP and aerodrome chart

Nhill Airport (ICAO: YNHL) is located 1 nautical mile (1.9 km; 1.2 mi) northwest of Nhill, Victoria, Australia, about four hours northwest of Melbourne. The Nhill Aviation Heritage Centre is located there.

== History ==
=== World War II ===
The Royal Australian Air Force (RAAF) commandeered the airfield during World War II.

No. 1 Operational Training Unit

No. 1 Operational Training Unit (1OTU) provided advanced operational flying and instruction. Formed on 22 December 1941, the unit was temporary housed at Nhill until RAAF East Sale at Sale, Victoria became available. Due to operational requirements the RAAF relocated 1OTU to RAAF Bairnsdale at Bairnsdale in June 1942.

No. 2 Air Navigation School

No. 2 Air Navigation School relocated to Nhill from RAAF Mount Gambier at Mount Gambier, South Australia in September 1941. The commanding officer was Wing Commander A.G. Carr (AFC). Airplanes used to train pilots in air navigation were Fairey Battles, Tiger Moths, Wirraways, Oxfords, Beauforts and Hudsons.

RAAF Armament School

On 13 December 1943 the RAAF Armament School relocated from Hamilton to Nhill. The commanding officer was Wing Commander A.D. Garrison. Renamed as the Air Armament School on 15 January 1944 and later to the Air Armament and Gas School.

Proposed USAAF camp

A USAAF advance flying unit camp was proposed in early 1942. Although buildings were constructed, the camp was never used.

=== Post-war ===
In 2008 the process began to create the Nhill Aviation Heritage Centre. As of 2017 it is restoring an Avro Anson and looking to purchase a CAC Wirraway.

== Engineering heritage award ==
Nhill Aeradio and Airport received an Engineering Heritage Marker from Engineers Australia as part of its Engineering Heritage Recognition Program.

== See also ==
- List of airports in Victoria
