= Birchip Airport =

- IATA: none; ICAO: YBIR

Summary
- Airport type: Public
- Operator: Buloke Shire Council
- Location: Birchip, Victoria
- Elevation AMSL: 340 ft / 104 m
- Coordinates: 36°00′S 142°55′E

Map
- Location in Victoria

Runways
Direction	Length		Surface
Direction	m	ft	Surface
04/22	1,045	3,428	Asphalt
09/27	524	1,719	Clay
- Sources: Australian AIP

Birchip Airport (ICAO: YBIR) is located at Birchip, Victoria, Australia.

== See also ==
- List of airports in Victoria, Australia
