= List of airports in Victoria, Australia =

This is a list of airports in the Australian state of Victoria.

== List of airports ==
The list is sorted by the name of the community served, click the sort buttons in the table header to switch listing order. Airports named in bold are Designated International Airports, even if they have limited or no scheduled international services.

Community	Airport name	Type	ICAO	IATA	Coordinates
Apollo Bay	Apollo Bay Airport	Private	YAPO		38°46′29″S 143°39′40″E
Ararat	Ararat Airport	Public	YARA	ARY	37°18′36″S 142°59′18″E
Geelong	**Avalon Airport**	Public	YMAV	AVV	38°02′22″S 144°28′10″E
Bacchus Marsh	Bacchus Marsh Airfield	Public	YBSS		37°44′00″S 144°25′18″E
Bairnsdale	Bairnsdale Airport	Public	YBNS	BSJ	37°53′15″S 147°34′04″E
Ballarat	Ballarat Airport	Public	YBLT		37°30′42″S 143°47′28″E
Benalla	Benalla Airport	Public	YBLA	BLN	36°33′06″S 146°00′24″E
Bendigo	Bendigo Airport	Public	YBDG	BXG	36°44′22″S 144°19′47″E
Birchip	Birchip Airport	Public	YBIR		35°59′56″S 142°54′47″E
Mount Hotham	Mount Hotham Airport	Private	YHOT	MHU	37°02′51″S 147°20′03″E
Coldstream, Melbourne	Coldstream Airport	Private	YCEM		37°43′42″S 145°24′30″E
Connewarre	Barwon Heads Airport	Public	YBRS		38°15′30″S 144°25′36″E
Coongulla	Coongulla Airport	Private	AU36		37°53′31″S 146°46′19″E
Corryong	Corryong Airport	Public	YCRG	CYG	36°10′58″S 147°53′16″E
Donald	Donald Airport	Public	YDOD		36°21′36″S 143°00′24″E
Echuca	Echuca Airport	Public	YECH	ECH	36°09′26″S 144°45′43″E
Essendon, Melbourne	Essendon Airport	Public	YMEN	MEB	37°43′41″S 144°54′07″E
Hamilton	Hamilton Airport	Public	YHML	HLT	37°38′54″S 142°03′54″E
Hopetoun	Hopetoun Airport	Public	YHPN	HTU	35°42′54″S 142°21′36″E
Horsham	Horsham Airport	Public	YHSM	HSM	36°40′11″S 142°10′22″E
Kerang	Kerang Airport	Public	YKER	KRA	35°45′06″S 143°56′24″E
Kotta	Kotta Airport	Private	YKTA		36°10′48″S 144°31′36″E
Kyneton	Kyneton Airport	Private	YKTN		37°13′30″S 144°26′48″E
Lakes Entrance	Great Lakes Airport	Private	YGRL		37°50′32″S 148°00′00″E
Lakes Entrance	Lakes Entrance Kalimna Airport		YLKE		37°51′08″S 147°57′16″E
Leongatha	Leongatha Airport	Public	YLEG		38°29′42″S 145°51′36″E
Lethbridge	Lethbridge Airpark	Private	YLED		37°55′06″S 144°06′06″E
Lilydale, Melbourne	Lilydale Airport	Private	YLIL		37°41′30″S 145°22′00″E
Mallacoota	Mallacoota Airport	Public	YMCO	XMC	37°35′56″S 149°43′15″E
Mangalore	Mangalore Airport	Public	YMNG		36°53′18″S 145°11′03″E
Marlo	Orbost Airport	Public	YORB	RBS	37°47′24″S 148°36′36″E
Maryborough	Maryborough Airport	Public	YMBU		37°02′00″S 143°42′30″E
Melbourne	**Melbourne Airport**	Public	YMML	MEL	37°40′24″S 144°50′36″E
Melton	Melton Airfield	Private	YMEL		37°37′18″S 144°33′54″E
Mildura	Mildura Airport	Public	YMIA	MQL	34°13′45″S 142°05′08″E
Mitta Mitta	Mitta Mitta Airport	Private	YITT		36°30′42″S 147°21′24″E
Moorabbin, Melbourne	Moorabbin Airport	Public	YMMB	MBW	37°58′33″S 145°06′08″E
Morwell	Latrobe Valley Airport	Public	YLTV	TGN	38°12′26″S 146°28′13″E
Nagambie	Nagambie-Wirrate Airport	Private	YNGW		36°47′2″S 145°2′13″E
Nhill	Nhill Airport	Public	YNHL		36°18′35″S 141°38′27″E
Phillip Island	Phillip Island Heliport	Private	YPID		38°31′24″S 145°19′36″E
Point Cook, Melbourne	RAAF Williams	Military	YMPC		37°55′54″S 144°45′12″E
Porepunkah	Porepunkah Airfield	Public	YPOK		36°43′06″S 146°53′04″E
Portland	Portland Airport	Public	YPOD	PTJ	38°19′05″S 141°28′16″E
Riddells Creek	Riddell Airfield	Private	YRID		37°28′21″S 144°43′28″E
Robinvale	Robinvale Airport	Public	YROI	RBC	34°38′36″S 142°46′14″E
Sale	RAAF Base East Sale	Military	YMES		38°05′56″S 147°08′58″E
Sale	West Sale Airport	Public	YWSL	SXE	38°05′30″S 146°57′55″E
Sea Lake	Sea Lake Airport	Public	YSLK		35°31′54″S 142°53′24″E
Shepparton	Shepparton Airport	Public	YSHT	SHT	36°25′44″S 145°23′33″E
St Arnaud	Saint Arnaud Airport	Public	YSTA		36°38′12″S 143°11′12″E
Stawell	Stawell Airport	Public	YSWL	SWC	37°04′18″S 142°44′24″E
St Leonards	St Leonards Airfield	Private	YSLE		38°10′09″S 144°41′19″E
Swan Hill	Swan Hill Airport	Public	YSWH	SWH	35°22′44″S 143°32′27″E
Tooradin	Tooradin Airfield	Private	YTDN		38°12′53″S 145°25′43″E
Torquay	Torquay Airport	Private	YTQY		38°17′45″S 144°21′52″E
Tyabb	Tyabb Airport	Private	YTYA		38°16′0″S 145°10′46″E
Wangaratta	Wangaratta Airport	Public	YWGT	WGT	36°24′57″S 146°18′25″E
Warracknabeal	Warracknabeal Airport	Public	YWKB	WKB	36°19′16″S 142°25′10″E
Warrnambool	Warrnambool Airport	Public	YWBL	WMB	38°17′43″S 142°26′48″E
Wycheproof	Wycheproof Airport	Public	YWYF		36°03′30″S 143°14′24″E
Yarram	Yarram Airport	Public	YYRM		38°34′00″S 146°45′18″E
Yarrawonga	Yarrawonga Airport	Public	YYWG		36°01′50″S 146°01′40″E

== Defunct airports ==
Community	Airport name	Type	ICAO	IATA	Coordinates
Berwick	Casey Airfield	Private	~~YBER~~		38°2′23″S 145°20′9″E
Fishermans Bend	Fishermen's Bend Aerodrome	Government			37°49′56″S 144°54′21″E
Mount Duneed, Geelong	Geelong Airport	Public	~~YGLG~~	~~GEX~~	38°13′31″S 144°19′59″E
Monomeith	Monomeith Park Airfield	Military			38°12′45″S 145°33′59″E

== See also ==
- List of airports in the Melbourne area
- List of airports in Australia
