= Sea Lake Airport =

Airport in Victoria, Australia

- IATA: none; ICAO: YSLK

Summary
- Airport type: Public
- Operator: Buloke Shire Council
- Location: Sea Lake, Victoria
- Elevation AMSL: 184 ft / 56 m
- Coordinates: 35°31′54″S 142°53′24″E

Map
- Location in Victoria

Runways
Direction	Length		Surface
Direction	m	ft	Surface
09/27	1,040	3,412	Grass
17/35	700	2,297	Grass
- Sources: Australian AIP

Sea Lake Airport (ICAO: YSLK) is located at Sea Lake, Victoria, Australia.

== See also ==
- List of airports in Victoria
