= Apollo Bay Airport =

- IATA: none; ICAO: YAPO

Summary
- Airport type: Public
- Serves: Apollo Bay, Victoria
- Location: Marengo, Victoria
- Elevation AMSL: 0 ft / 0 m
- Coordinates: 38°46′38″S 143°39′43″E

Map
- Location in Victoria

Runways
Direction	Length		Surface
Direction	m	ft	Surface
13/31	338	1,109	Grass
07/25	579	1,900	Grass
- Sources: AIP

Apollo Bay Airport (ICAO: YAPO) is an airport located 1.3 nautical miles (2.4 km; 1.5 mi) west of Apollo Bay, Victoria, Australia.

== See also ==
- List of airports in Victoria, Australia
