= Ararat Airport =

- IATA: ARY; ICAO: YARA

Summary
- Airport type: Public
- Operator: Ararat Rural City Council
- Location: Ararat, Victoria
- Elevation AMSL: 1,008 ft / 307 m
- Coordinates: 37°18′36″S 142°59′18″E

Map
- Location in Victoria

Runways
Direction	Length		Surface
Direction	m	ft	Surface
04/22	660	2,165	Grass
12/30	1,240	4,068	Asphalt
- Sources: AIP

Ararat Airport (IATA: ARY, ICAO: YARA) is 4 nautical miles (7.4 km; 4.6 mi) south-west of Ararat, Victoria, Australia on the Western Highway. Its main function is as a gliding club.

== See also ==
- List of airports in Victoria, Australia
