= Warrnambool Airport =

- IATA: WMB; ICAO: YWBL

Summary
- Airport type: Public
- Owner/Operator: Warrnambool City Council
- Location: Warrnambool, Victoria
- Elevation AMSL: 242 ft / 74 m
- Coordinates: 38°17′44″S 142°26′53″E

Map
- Location in Victoria

Runways
Direction	Length		Surface
Direction	m	ft	Surface
04/22	1,069	3,507	Asphalt
13/31	1,372	4,501	Asphalt
- Sources: Australian AIP and aerodrome chart

Warrnambool Airport (IATA: WMB, ICAO: YWBL) is located 6 nautical miles (11 km; 6.9 mi) northwest of Warrnambool, Victoria in Australia. Avalon Air Services operates training activities from the airport. HEMS 4 (Helicopter Emergency Medical Service), an AgustaWestland AW139, of Air Ambulance Victoria is based at the airport.

== See also ==
- List of airports in Victoria, Australia
