= Hamilton Airport (Victoria) =

- IATA: HLT; ICAO: YHML

Summary
- Airport type: Public
- Operator: Southern Grampians Shire Council
- Location: Hamilton, Victoria
- Elevation AMSL: 803 ft / 245 m
- Coordinates: 37°38′54″S 142°03′54″E

Map
- Location in Victoria

Runways
Direction	Length		Surface
Direction	m	ft	Surface
10/28	1,233	4,045	Gravel
17/35	1,404	4,606	Asphalt
- Sources: Australian AIP and aerodrome chart

Hamilton Airport (IATA: HLT, ICAO: YHML) is located 6.5 nautical miles (12.0 km; 7.5 mi) north of Hamilton, Victoria, Australia. The airport is about 300 km (190 mi) west of Melbourne. Sharp Airlines was established at the airport and despite cancelling scheduled service in December 2014, retains a flying school at Hamilton. The airport is also home to the Hamilton Aero Club. The airport is operated by the Southern Grampians Shire Council.

The terminal, called the Sir RM Ansett Terminal, is named after Reginald Myles Ansett, who founded Ansett Airways at Hamilton in 1936. The Ansett Transport Museum is housed in the company's first aircraft hangar.

During World War II, the airport was home to the Royal Australian Air Force Armament School until 1943, when it relocated to Nhill.

== See also ==
- List of airports in Victoria, Australia
