= Bill Garing =

William Henry Garing
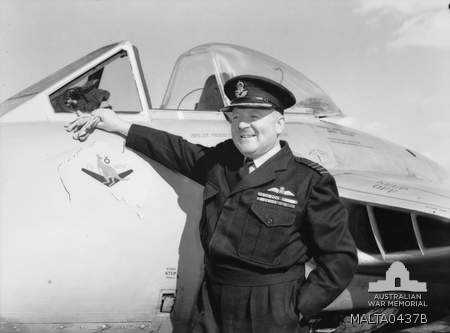
- Group Captain Bill Garing in Cyprus, 1953
- Born: 26 July 1910; Corryong, Victoria
- Died: 1 January 2004 (aged 93)
- Military career
- Allegiance: Australia
- Branch: Royal Australian Air Force
- Service years: 1928–64
- Rank: Air Commodore
- Nickname: Bull
- Commands: RAAF Overseas Headquarters (1953); Western Area Command (1946–48); No. 1 Operational Training Unit RAAF (1943–44); No. 9 Operational Group RAAF (1942–43)
- Conflicts: Second World War; Battle of the Atlantic; New Guinea campaign; Battle of Milne Bay; Battle of the Bismarck Sea
- Awards: Commander of the Order of the British Empire; Distinguished Flying Cross; Mentioned in Despatches; Distinguished Service Cross (United States)

Air Commodore William Garing, CBE, DFC (26 July 1910 – 1 January 2004) was a senior officer in the Royal Australian Air Force.

== Early life ==
William Henry Garing was born in Corryong, Victoria, on 26 September 1910 to parents George and Amy. His education included Corryong Higher Elementary School, Royal Melbourne Institute of Technology and Royal Military College, Duntroon. At Duntroon, he graduated as a cadet from the Flying-Training School at Point Cook in 1929.

== Career ==
Garing later joined the RAAF after enlisting at Point Cook on 10 December 1930.

In 1931 and 1939, Garing spent time in the UK and was there at the outbreak of World War II. He served with No. 10 Squadron RAAF, flying Sunderlands as Flight Commander in the Coastal Command R.A.F. conducting anti-submarine operations and patrols from bases in the United Kingdom. He received the Distinguished Flying Cross after he held off three waves of German bombers, over 12 hours, that were attacking the Armed Merchant Cruiser Mooltan on 31 July 1940. Garing was also instrumental in ensuring that a final group of survivors of City of Benares were picked up on 25 September 1940.

Garing returned to Australia in 1941 and commanded No.9 (Operational) Group R.A.A.F.. When ranked as a Group Captain, received the US Army Distinguished Service Cross for "extraordinary heroism in action in New Guinea, during the Papuan Campaign, 23 July 1942 to 8 January 1943".

In 1948, Garing was at the Joint Services Staff College in the U.K and in 1953 would take command of the RAAF Overseas Headquarters in London. He retired in July 1964.

== Personal life ==
Garing's first marriage ended in 1940 and produced two children. His second marriage in 1954 produced two more daughters.

Garing died 1 January 2004, after a very long illness and was buried at the Northern Suburbs Crematorium one week later.
