= No. 1 Operational Training Unit RAAF =

Operational conversion unit of the Royal Australian Air Force

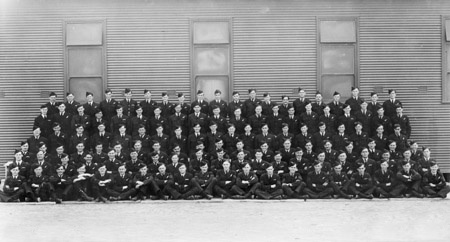
- Members of two training courses conducted at No. 1 Operational Training Unit in 1942
- Active: 1941–45
- Country: Australia
- Branch: Royal Australian Air Force
- Role: Operational training
- Part of: Southern Area Command
- Garrison/HQ: Nhill, Victoria (1941–42); Bairnsdale, Victoria (1942–43); East Sale, Victoria (1943–45)

Commanders
- Notable commanders: Bill Garing (1943–44)

No. 1 Operational Training Unit (No. 1 OTU) was an operational conversion unit of the Royal Australian Air Force (RAAF) during World War II. Formed in December 1941 at Nhill, Victoria, it relocated to Bairnsdale in mid-1942, and then to East Sale the following year. No. 1 OTU's primary role was to train aircrew for multi-engined aircraft operations. At its peak of activity in August 1944, it was operating over 130 aircraft, the most numerous being Bristol Beauforts. Its aircraft and personnel also conducted transport missions in New Guinea and maritime patrols in southern Australian waters. Following the end of hostilities, the unit was disbanded in December 1945.

== History ==
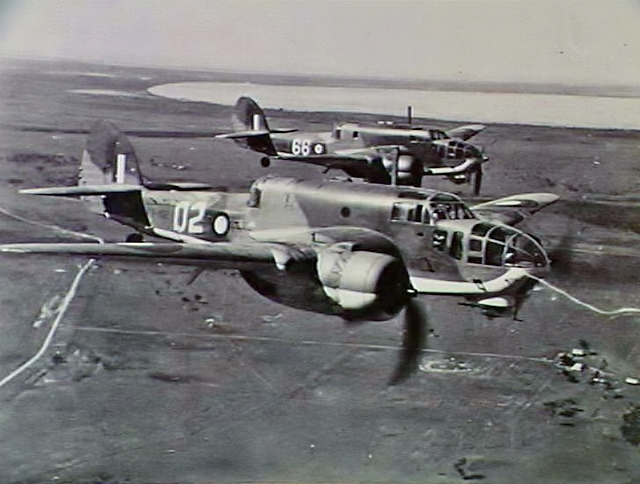
Bristol Beauforts of No. 1 OTU over Bairnsdale, Victoria, in October 1942

During World War II, the Royal Australian Air Force (RAAF) established several operational training units to convert recently graduated pilots from advanced trainers to combat aircraft, and to add fighting ability to the flying skills they had already learned. No. 1 Operational Training Unit (No. 1 OTU) was formed at Nhill, Victoria, on 8 December 1941, under the control of Southern Area Command. Its inaugural commanding officer was Wing Commander A.I.G. Carr. The unit's purpose was to train pilots, air observers and Wireless air gunners for multi-engine aircraft operations. The first courses commenced on 22 December. After preliminary training, pilots went through a six-week conversion to Lockheed Hudsons and Bristol Beauforts, while observers and gunners underwent instruction on Airspeed Oxfords and Avro Ansons. Their training included bombing, gunnery, navigation, evasive action, ship recognition and maritime reconnaissance.

Nhill was always meant to be a temporary location for No. 1 OTU, whose home was to be East Sale, also in Victoria. As accommodation at East Sale would not be available until October 1942, the school's 1,630 personnel were relocated to Bairnsdale in June and July. The base's living quarters, recreational buildings and 88 tents could not fully accommodate this influx, so the RAAF rented hotels in Bairnsdale for 320 airmen. On 10 December 1942, No. 1 OTU Detached Flight, consisting of 15 Hudsons and 108 personnel including air and maintenance crews, was sent to North-Eastern Area Command to help fulfill urgent transport requirements in New Guinea. This force joined a military Douglas DC-2 and eleven civil aircraft pressed into service to form RAAF Special Transport Flight, which operated out of Wards Airfield from 14 December 1942 to 11 January 1943. The Hudsons flew 645 sorties, carrying some 1,100 troops and almost 800 tons of equipment. Two of the Hudsons were lost, one to enemy action and one to friendly fire, and several were damaged.

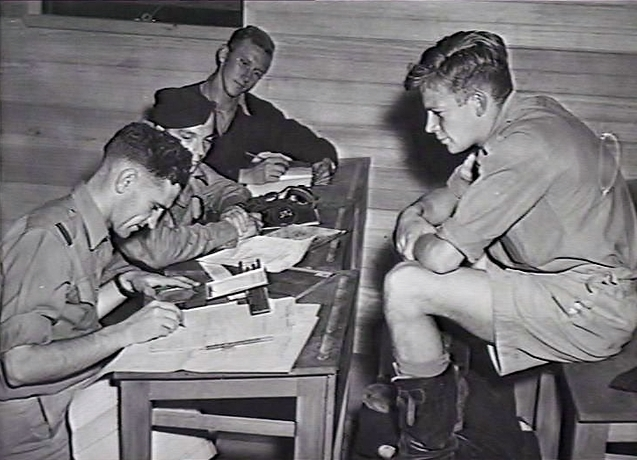
Navigational instruction under way at No. 1 OTU, East Sale, Victoria, in March 1944

By April 1943, No. 1 OTU's complement had grown to 2,411 personnel. Over a four-day period beginning 20 April, the unit relocated to East Sale, using 110 tenders in 535 trips along the Princes Highway. Its fleet of aircraft included 55 Beauforts, 35 Oxfords, 25 Hudsons, 14 Fairey Battles and one de Havilland Tiger Moth. Training courses commenced at the new base the day after the move was completed. One of the students on the first course at East Sale was future Prime Minister Gough Whitlam. Group Captain Bill Garing served as commanding officer from August 1943 to February 1944. He took measures to allay concerns among crews regarding the Australian-built Beaufort, which appeared to have a mysterious fault that caused many fatalities. By the time No. 1 OCU moved to East Sale, it had suffered 47 accidents involving Beauforts. Garing organised an aerobatic display by a Beaufort for the benefit of students, and an open day at the base on 16 October 1943; he also ordered extensive ground testing on the aircraft. Accidents continued to occur, and it was ultimately through the efforts of Wing Commander Charles Learmonth immediately prior to his death in a Beaufort off the Western Australian coast that the nature of the problem was recognised and overcome.

As well as maintaining its training program, No. 1 OTU was required to periodically release instructors, students and aircraft for maritime patrols to protect Australian shipping lanes. In April 1943, six Hudsons were attached to No. 32 Squadron at Camden, New South Wales, for convoy escort and anti-submarine duties. A year later, four Beauforts were deployed to Mount Gambier, South Australia, to carry out a two-day escort for the Dutch transport ship Van Ruys. Beauforts from No. 1 OTU were also ordered to locate and destroy the German U-Boat U-862, which had shelled the Greek tanker Illosis off Kingston, South Australia, on 9 December 1944. Although the submarine was not sunk, it was apparently frightened off by the presence of the Beauforts and aircraft from other RAAF units in the vicinity. No. 1 OTU's intensive training regime included night flying, so that it operated almost round the clock. Flying effort reached a peak in August 1944, when 132 aircraft made 2,479 flights, instructing 221 students. The unit had by this time logged over 100,000 flying hours. It trained a total of 2,150 aircrew on Beauforts during the war, and suffered 147 aircraft accidents on instructional and operational fights in Australia and New Guinea, resulting in the loss of 131 aircrew killed or missing. Post-war demobilisation saw the disbandment of all the RAAF's operational training units; No. 1 OTU was dissolved in December 1945.
