= Yarram Airport =

- IATA: none; ICAO: YYRM

Summary
- Operator: Wellington Shire Council
- Location: Yarram, Victoria
- Elevation AMSL: 60 ft / 18 m
- Coordinates: 38°34′00″S 146°45′07″E

Map
- Location in Victoria

Runways
Direction	Length		Surface
Direction	m	ft	Surface
09/27	756	2,480	Sand
05/23	1,090	3,576	Grass/sand
- Sources: Australian AIP and aerodrome chart

Yarram Airport (ICAO: YYRM) is located 3 nautical miles (5.6 km; 3.5 mi) east of Yarram, Victoria, Australia.

== See also ==
- List of airports in Victoria, Australia
