= Phillip Island Heliport =

Phillip Island Airport
- IATA: none; ICAO: YPID

Summary
- Airport type: Private
- Operator: Philip Island Helicopters
- Location: Phillip Island
- Elevation AMSL: 43 ft / 13 m
- Coordinates: 38°31′24″S 145°19′36″E

Map
- Location in Victoria
- Sources: Australian AIP and Philip Island Helicopters

Phillip Island Airport (ICAO: YPID) is a small private airport on Phillip Island, Victoria, Australia.

== See also ==
- List of airports in Victoria, Australia
