= Yarrawonga Airport =

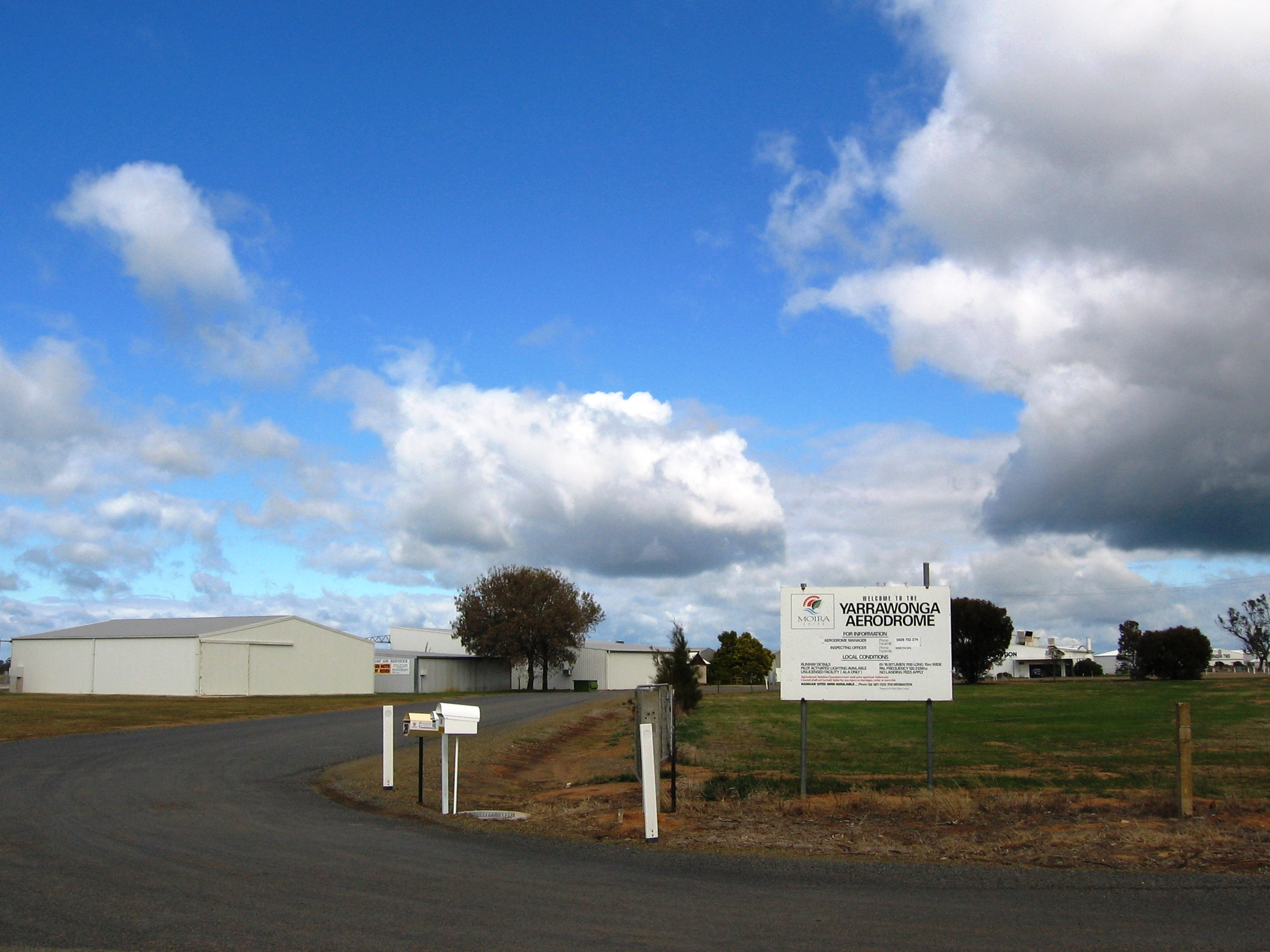
- IATA: none; ICAO: YYWG

Summary
- Airport type: Public
- Operator: Moira Shire Council
- Location: Yarrawonga, Victoria
- Elevation AMSL: 424 ft / 129 m
- Coordinates: 36°01′50″S 146°01′40″E

Map
- Location in Victoria

Runways
| Direction | Length | | Surface |
| Direction | m | ft | Surface |
|---|---|---|---|
| 01/19 | 1,143 | 3,750 | Concrete/asphalt |
- Sources: Australian AIP and aerodrome chart

Yarrawonga Airport (ICAO: YYWG) is located 2 nautical miles (3.7 km; 2.3 mi) south-east of the town of Yarrawonga, Victoria on the border with New South Wales, Australia.

== See also ==
- List of airports in Victoria, Australia
