= Barwon Heads Airport =

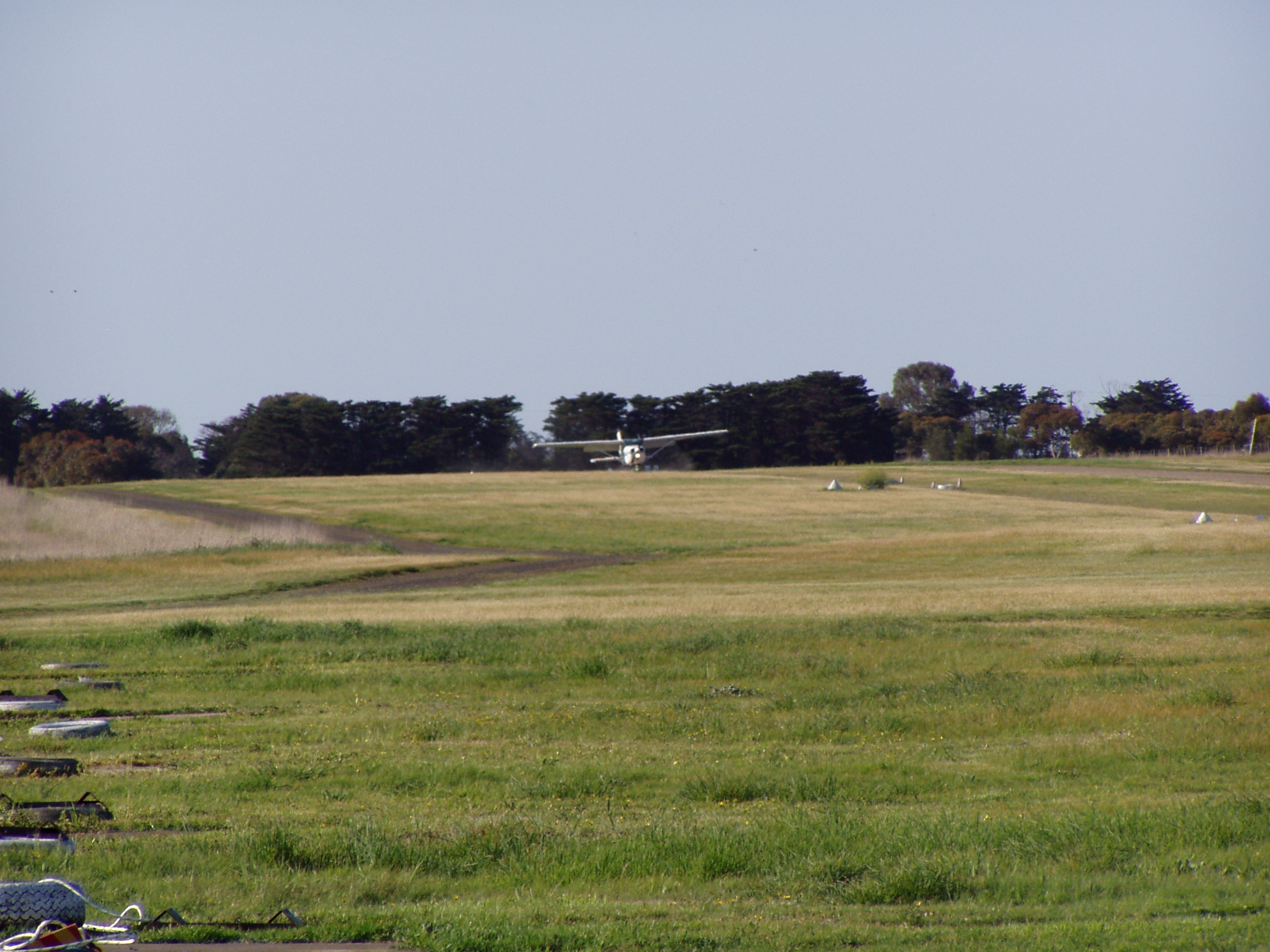
- IATA: none; ICAO: YBRS

Summary
- Airport type: Public
- Operator: South Barwon Air Services
- Serves: Geelong
- Location: Connewarre, Australia
- Elevation AMSL: 50 ft / 15 m
- Coordinates: 38°15′29″S 144°25′39″E
- Website: https://barwonheadsairport.com.au/

Map
- Location in Victoria

Runways
Direction	Length		Surface
Direction	m	ft	Surface
18/36	800	2,625	Sealed
09/27	520	1,706	Grass
- Sources: AIP and Great Circle

Barwon Heads Airport (ICAO: YBRS) is a small airfield specifically for light aircraft on the Bellarine Peninsula near the township of Barwon Heads, Victoria, Australia. It is primarily used for scenic flights, private aircraft and flight training.

The airport has remained small and undeveloped until recently, where development is soon to commence. In early 2008, a local council permit was given to construct another five hangars and associated car parking.

The airport has a flight training school with two classrooms, fuel facilities and a seafood outlet. A shower and toilets are located in the terminal building, where there is also a kitchen, snack and drink machines and a lounge area.

The airport has two runways, the main one is a sealed north–south runway, and there is a smaller east/west grass runway, primarily for ultralight aircraft, and light aircraft in stronger wind conditions

== History ==
Runway layout and parking map (page 1 of 2)

The owners of Barwon Heads Airport have regularly raised their concerns in relation to skydiving being conducted in the vicinity of the airport. Their concerns are that the airport runway is too close to many proposed drop zones that have been suggested. In 2005, a ban was placed on skydiving in the vicinity of the airport. In 2008, airport owners accused the business Skydive City of using an illegal runway 200 m (660 ft) from the airport days after the business was evicted from an airport hangar for failing to pay rent. Airport owners claimed that the illegal runway was compromising the safety of airport users.

== Accidents and incidents ==
On 25 April 2014, a skydiver was killed when his parachute failed to open. An investigation is currently being conducted by the Australian Parachute Federation.

== See also ==
- List of airports in Victoria
- Transportation in Australia
