= Coldstream Airport =

- IATA: none; ICAO: YCEM

Summary
- Airport type: Private
- Owner: Doake family
- Operator: Yarra Valley Flight Training
- Location: Coldstream, Victoria
- Opened: 17 March 1962
- Elevation AMSL: 280 ft (85 m)
- Coordinates: 37°43′42″S 145°24′30″E
- Website: www.ycem.com.au

Map
- Location in Victoria

Runways
Direction	Length		Surface
Direction	m	ft	Surface
17/35	795	2,608	Sealed
- Sources: AIP

Coldstream Airport (ICAO: YCEM) is a small Australian regional airfield located in the township of Coldstream in Greater Melbourne, Victoria.

Coldstream is one of two airports in the Yarra Valley serving the general aviation needs of outer eastern Melbourne, with the other being Lilydale Airport.

== History ==
The airstrip at Coldstream was established in March 1962 by Jim Doake, and the airport is still owned by the Doake family. From January 1996, the airfield was operated by the Royal Victorian Aero Club as the base for its flight training school. In February 2011, the RVAC committee voted to relinquish its operation of the airfield, and the flying school's chief pilot, Bob Boyd, took over its operation as Yarra Valley Flight Training on 1 August 2011. The runway was sealed in April 2014, and is the only sealed strip in the Yarra Valley.

The airfield was also the base of AvServe until 2018 when it closed down.

== See also ==
- List of airports in Victoria
