= Lilydale Airport =

Airport in Yering, Victoria

- IATA: QLL; ICAO: YLIL

Summary
- Airport type: Private
- Operator: Jonathan Merridew
- Serves: Melbourne
- Location: Yering
- Opened: 1968
- Elevation AMSL: 242 ft / 74 m
- Coordinates: 37°41′30″S 145°22′00″E
- Website: lilydaleairport.com.au

Map
- Location in Greater Melbourne

Runways
Direction	Length		Surface
Direction	m	ft	Surface
18R/36L	1,350	4,429	grass
18L/36R	850	2,789	grass
- Sources: AIP

Lilydale Airport (ICAO: YLIL) is a privately owned aerodrome located in the regional suburb of Yering, Victoria, Australia approximately 6 km north of Lilydale. The airport offers flight training, air charters, aircraft rentals and skydiving.

== About ==
Lilydale Airport is one of two airports in the Yarra Valley serving the general aviation needs of outer eastern Melbourne, with the other being Coldstream Airport.

The low-lying grass runways flood with the nearby Yarra River during severe rainfall and can occasionally remain submerged after an intense downpour. With the Christmas Hills to the west, on colder mornings with nil wind the strip has a chance to be covered with a thin layer of fog delaying early morning flights.

== Incidents ==
On 24 March 2018 the pilot of a Cessna 340 was on a private flight from Bankstown, New South Wales to Lilydale, Victoria. The aircraft was operating under the instrument flight rules (IFR). The aircraft arrived at Lilydale at 12:05 AEDT.

During descent into Lilydale the pilot reported passing through broken cloud and becoming visual with the airfield. The pilot then cancelled IFR and proceeded to overfly the airfield to inspect the runway and windsock. The windsock indicated little wind. There was rain forecast in the area and showers in the vicinity, however there was no rain reported over the airfield at the time of arrival.

The pilot conducted a normal approach and touched down 250-300 m down the 850 m grass runway. After touchdown, the pilot applied moderate braking force. After realising that the aircraft was not slowing, the pilot applied further braking. The aircraft failed to slow and the pilot confirmed the throttles were at idle and pumped the brakes. The aircraft continued to slide down the runway. As the aircraft approached the end of the runway, the pilot applied full left rudder to turn the aircraft which resulted in a slight veer to the left. The aircraft collided with an embankment at the end of the runway, passed over a road and coming to rest against a fence (Figure 1). The aircraft was substantially damaged and the pilot was not injured.

Post-flight it was determined that the airfield had received significant rain within around 1 hour before the landing which may have resulted in aquaplaning. The pilot reported that flap was set at 30 degrees for landing, less than the maximum available of 40 degrees. Contributing factors to the overrun include;

- wet grass runway (with possible standing water)
- nil wind conditions
- selection of less than full flap
- touchdown one third down the runway.

Aircraft Details

Model: 340

Sector: Piston

Operation type: Private

Damage: Substantial

Manufacturer: Cessna Aircraft Company

== See also ==
- List of airports in Victoria, Australia
- Transport in Australia
