= Swan Hill Airport =

- IATA: SWH; ICAO: YSWH

Summary
- Airport type: Public
- Operator: Swan Hill Rural City Council
- Location: Swan Hill, Victoria, Australia
- Elevation AMSL: 234 ft / 71 m
- Coordinates: 35°22′42″S 143°32′10″E

Map
- Location in Victoria

Runways
Direction	Length		Surface
Direction	m	ft	Surface
04/22	709	2,326	Dirt
08/26	1,495	4,905	Asphalt
15/33	710	2,329	Dirt
- Sources: Australian AIP and aerodrome chart

Swan Hill Airport (IATA: SWH, ICAO: YSWH) is located 2.5 nautical miles (4.6 km; 2.9 mi) south of Swan Hill, Victoria, Australia.

== See also ==
- List of airports in Victoria
