= Bairnsdale Airport =

Bairnsdale Aerodrome
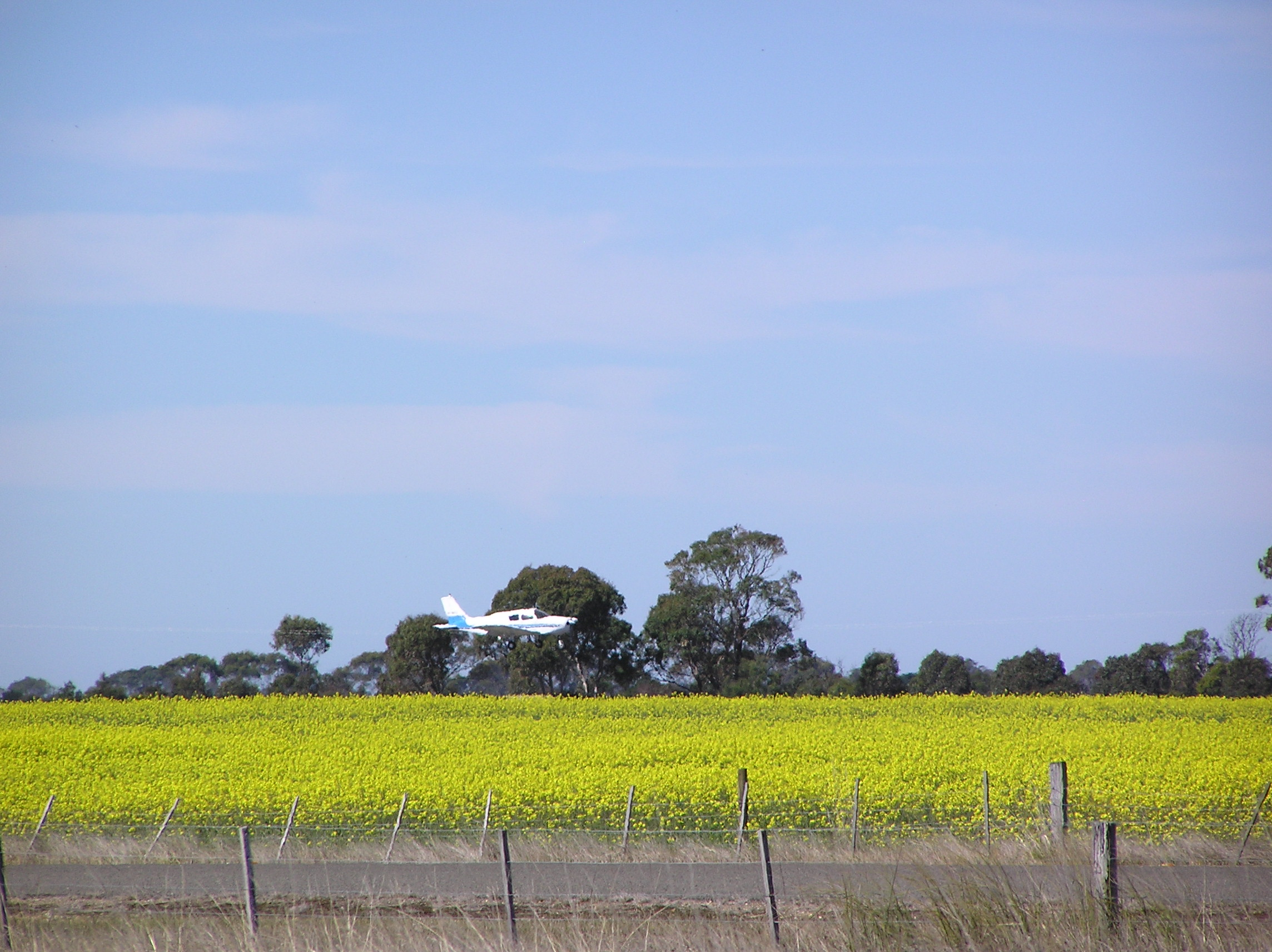
- IATA: BSJ; ICAO: YBNS

Summary
- Airport type: Public
- Operator: East Gippsland Shire Council
- Location: Bairnsdale, Victoria
- Opened: c. 1939 – RAAF Station Bairnsdale c. 1954 – Civil Airport
- Elevation AMSL: 165 ft (50 m)
- Coordinates: 37°53′15″S 147°34′04″E
- Website: www.eastgippsland.vic.gov.au/Services/Aerodromes/Bairnsdale_Aerodrome_Pilot_Information

Map
- Location in Victoria

Runways
Direction	Length		Surface
Direction	m	ft	Surface
04/22	1,101	3,612	Asphalt
13/31	850	2,789	Asphalt
- Sources: Australian AIP and aerodrome chart

Bairnsdale Airport (IATA: BSJ, ICAO: YBNS) is located 4 nautical miles (7.4 km; 4.6 mi) south west of Bairnsdale, Victoria, Australia, off the Princes Highway.

== History ==
It was originally RAAF Station Bairnsdale, which was a training establishment formed during World War II. No. 1 Operational Training Unit (1OTU) and the General Reconnaissance School (GRS) were based there during the war years.

== Operations ==
The Airport, despite not having passenger service, is used regularly. It is heavily used by Air Ambulance for transporting patients. It also has small fleet maintenance facilities, and is a popular destination for numerous charter flights.

There have been proposals for regional passenger service to return to Bairnsdale to boost tourism in the East Gippsland Region, with flights to Melbourne, and possibly Albury and Sydney. However, these proposals have never become reality.

== See also ==
- List of airports in Victoria
