= Tyabb Airport =

- IATA: none; ICAO: YTYA

Summary
- Airport type: Private
- Operator: Peninsula Aero Club
- Location: Tyabb, Victoria
- Elevation AMSL: 88 ft / 27 m
- Coordinates: 38°16′0″S 145°10′46″E

Map
- Location in Victoria

Runways
Direction	Length		Surface
Direction	m	ft	Surface
17/35	1,000	3,281	Asphalt
08/26	600	1,969	Grass

Helipads
Number	Length		Surface
Number	m	ft	Surface
H1	8	26	Asphalt
H2	8	26	Asphalt
- Sources: AIP

Tyabb Airport (ICAO: YTYA), also called Tyabb Airfield, is a small regional airport located just west of the town of Tyabb, Victoria on the Mornington Peninsula.

Peninsula Aero Club use various different aircraft to train their student pilots, Aeroprakt A22-LS Foxbat, Cessna 152, Cessna 172, Beechcraft Sierra, American Champion Decathlon, Beechcraft Travel Air, and Partenavia P68B.

The airport is the site of the Tyabb Air Show, which is held every two years.

As of 2024, it was also the home base of a number of World War II-era warbirds, including an ex-USAAF Curtis P-40 Kittyhawk and an Australian-built ex-RAAF CA-18 Mustang.

== See also ==
- List of airports in Victoria
