= Mobile intensive care ambulance =

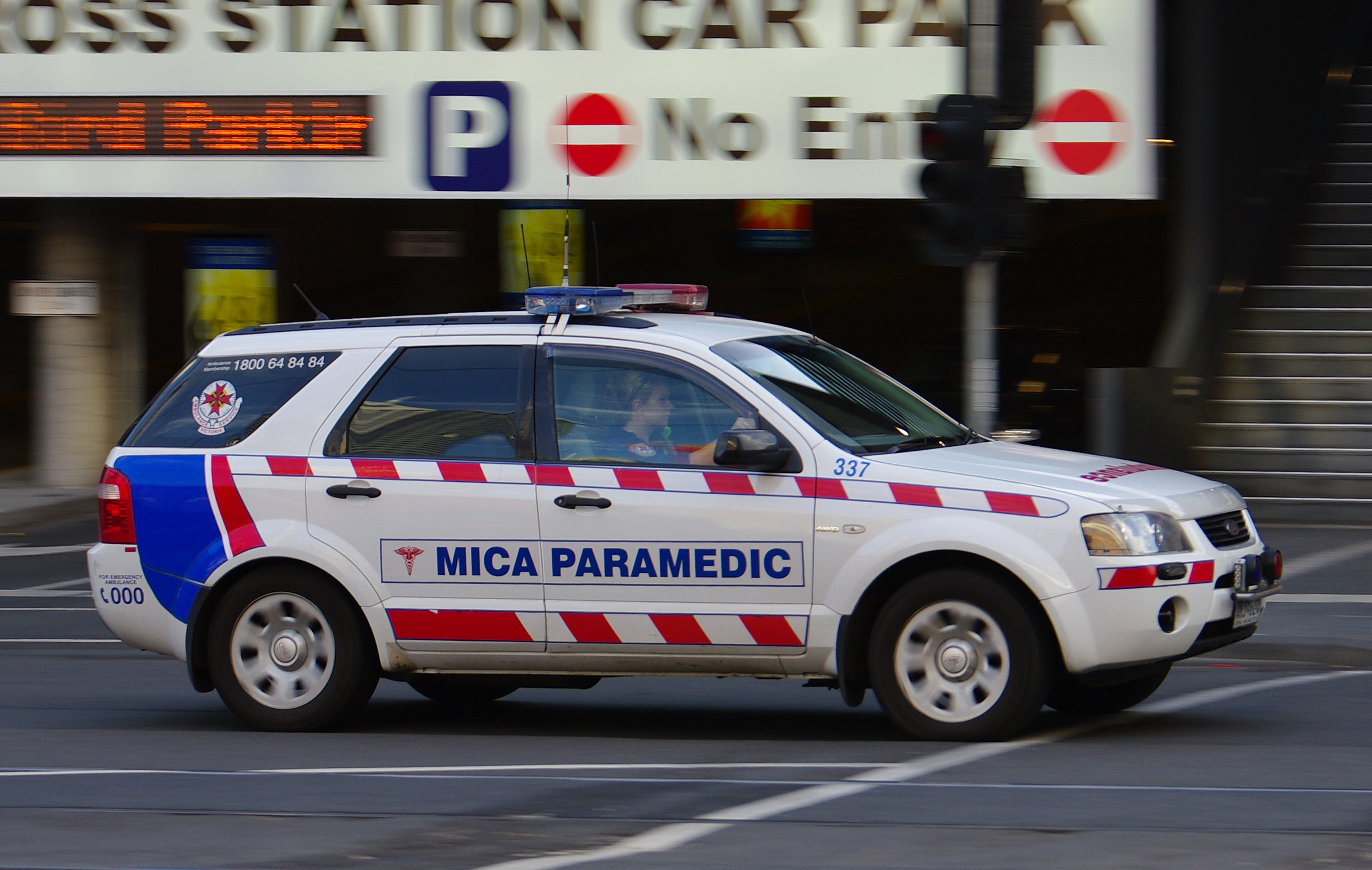
MICA single responder in Melbourne, Australia.

Australian mobile intensive care ambulances (MICA) are well-equipped ambulances staffed by highly trained paramedics dispatched to emergency situations where patients require a higher level of care than a regular ambulance can provide.

== MICA paramedics ==
MICA paramedics are extremely highly trained and experienced medical professionals. As with all Australian and New Zealand paramedics they hold either an advanced diploma of health science (paramedic) (which can be converted to a degree level by off-campus studies), or other recognised bachelor's degree, and then do extra study to the MICA level.

MICA paramedics must also complete a graduate diploma in emergency healthcare. This requires concurrent employment with ambulance services in a clinical role and at least two years post-qualification experience as a paramedic in the service. While also working as a paramedic the student must complete a year’s worth of course work on advance emergency health. Paramedics may also choose to complete a Masters in Emergency Health (paramedic). However, this focuses more on research, emergency services management and community health rather than frontline clinical care.

Working as a paramedic, whether it be MICA or ALS (advanced life support), can be extremely emotionally taxing.

== Equipment ==
During the course of a day's work, paramedics will go through a lot of medical supplies to treat a variety of injuries and illnesses. Standard equipment that paramedics use include:

- Defibrillator / monitor with non-invasive monitoring and 12-lead telemetry
- Oxygen therapy - re-breathing circuit
- Advanced airway management set
- Suction kit
- Spinal collars
- Spine board
- Inflatable splints
- Collapsible wheelchair
- Medical kits
- Drugs
- Blood pressure cuff (sphygmometer)
- Pulse oximeter
- Scoop stretcher

MICA paramedics may also use:

- Capnograph
- Pneumocath
- Intraosseous kit
- Advanced drugs including inotropes, antiarrhythmics, sedatives and neuromuscular blockers
- Syringe pumps
- Cold intravenous fluids to induce hypothermia

== Vehicles ==
MICA paramedics crew a range of vehicles depending on their mission.

== Ambulance Victoria ==
In Victoria, MICA Paramedic teams are equipped with modified versions of the Mercedes Benz Sprinter. In the metropolitan area of Melbourne, the changes from the models used by advanced life support (ALS) paramedic Team are to accommodate equipment unique to MICA. In Regional Victoria, the same Mercedes Sprinter is used whether it be as a MICA or an ALS vehicle. Often an ALS and a MICA paramedic work as a rostered crew (PRU).

In addition to 2-paramedic crew MICA ambulance, a number of MICA single responder units (SRU) are located within central metropolitan areas and regional areas. MICA single responders are equipped with a range of vehicles including Holden Adventra 4WD wagons and Ford Territory vehicles.

In rural and regional settings, time sensitive patients are treated and transported either by advanced life support paramedics (ALS) and/or mobile intensive care paramedics with support by helicopter based MICA paramedics. MICA paramedics often are requested to support ALS paramedics when dealing with a sick patient as a 'back-up' crew.

CSO (Clinical Support Officer), who provide additional support to ALS crews, are also often MICA trained.

== Ambulance Services New South Wales ==
In addition to the primary response vehicles above, the NSW Service also operates specialised vehicles that have been designed to meet geographical and operational requirements, including:

Rescue trucks
Ambulance rescue vehicles are equipped with a vast array of equipment including motorised hydraulic tools, air tools, hand held global positioning satellite units, fibre optic search scopes, portable atmospheric testing units, lighting and breathing apparatus.

Rapid response vehicles
Seven Subaru Forrester AWD vehicles and two BMW motorbikes make up the current rapid response fleet. All vehicles have distinctive signage, high visibility warning lights and sirens. Subaru Forresters are also equipped with an advanced satellite navigation system.

Over-snow vehicles
Its fleet of vehicles at Perisher Valley Station include a Haaglund all-terrain vehicle, a Kassborher oversnow vehicle, two Yamaha snowmobiles, a 4WD Quad Bike and trailer and a 4WD Mercedes.

Mega lift trucks
These multi-purpose vehicles are used for a range of incidents including chemical, biological and radiological (CBR) incidents.

Command and communications vehicle
This vehicle serves as a mobile command post for the management of incidents and major planned events. Wirelessly connected to the ambulance wide area network it offers video conferencing, SmartBoard and voice communications. The vehicle also provides remote dispatching capability with the system connected in real time to the central computer aided dispatching system.
