= List of mines in South Africa =

This list of mines in South Africa is subsidiary to the list of mines article and lists working, defunct and future mines in the country and is organised by the primary mineral output. For practical purposes stone, marble and other quarries may be included in this list.

== Chromium ==
- Dwarsrivier mine
- Thaba mine

== Coal ==
Mine	Product(s)	Coordinates	Associated town	Owner	Dates	Comments
Grootegeluk Coal Mine	Coal		Limpopo	Exxaro	1980–Present	
Leeuwpan mine	Coal		Mpumalanga	Exxaro	1995–Present	
Tshikondeni mine	Coal		Limpopo	Exxaro	????–Present	
Mafube coal	Coal		Mpumalanga	Exxaro	????–Present	
Mafube joint venture (JV)2	Coal		Mpumalanga	Exxaro	????–Present	
Iyanda mine	Coal		Mpumalanga	Exxaro	????–Present	
Exxaro reductants	Coal		Limpopo	Exxaro	????–Present	
Arnot mine	Coal		Mpumalanga	Exxaro	????–Present	
Matla mine	Coal		Mpumalanga	Exxaro	????–Present	
North Block Complex	Coal		Mpumalanga	Exxaro	????–Present	
New Clydesdale mine	Coal		Mpumalanga	Exxaro	????–Present	
Goedgevonden mine	Coal					
Vele coal mine	Coal					
Maloma Coliery	Coal		Eswatini	Inyatsi	????-Present	

== Diamond ==
Mine	Product(s)	Coordinates	Associated town	Owner	Dates	Comments
Baken diamond mine	Diamond		Lower Orange River	Trans Hex	????–Present	Probable reserves are 21.2 million cubic meters of ore at an ore grade of 1.69 carats (338 mg) per 100 cubic meters (3.38 mg/m^{3}). There is a waste rock overburden of about 33 million cubic meters.

- Big Hole
- Du Toit's Pan
- Finsch diamond mine
- Jagersfontein Mine
- Koffiefontein mine
- Premier Mine
- Venetia Diamond Mine
- Voorspoed diamond mine

== Gold ==
- Blyvooruitzicht
- Buffelsfontein mine
- Burnstone mine
- East Rand Mine
- Free State goldfields
- Kusasalethu mine
- Mponeng Gold Mine
- South Deep mine
- TauTona Mine
- Transvaal gold fields

== Iron ==
Mine	Product(s)	Coordinates	Associated town	Dates	Comments
Khumani mine	Iron		Kathu		loco mine mm9
Beeshoek mine	Iron		Postmasburg		
Sishen mine	Iron				

== Lead mines ==
- Maitland Mines

== Manganese ==
- Black Rock mine
- Gloria mine
- Kalagadi Manganese mine
- Mamatwan mine
- Middelplaats mine
- Nchwaning mine
- Wessels mine

== Platinum ==
- Afplats mine
- Bafokeng mine
- Bathopele mine
- Bokoni mine
- Dishaba mine
- Imbasa mine
- Impala mine
- Inkosi mine
- Khomanani mine
- Khuseleka mine
- Kroondal mine
- Marula mine
- Modikwa mine
- Mogalakwena mine
- Mototolo mine
- Pandora mine
- Siphumelele mine
- Tamboti mine
- Thembelani mine
- Tumela mine
- Twickenham mine
- Two Rivers mine
- Union North mine

== Titanium platinum ==
- Xolobeni mine

== Uranium ==
- Beaufort West mine
- Beisa North mine
- Buffelsfontein uranium mine
- Denny Dalton mine
- Karoo mine
- Rietkuil mine
- South Deep uranium mine
- Springbok Flats mine
- Vaal River mine
