= Dwyka Group =

Geological group in the Karoo Supergroup from South Africa

- Stratigraphic range: Late Carboniferous-Early Permian; ~317–288 Ma
- Type: Geologic group
- Sub-units: Mbizane, Elandsvlei & Tshidzi Formations
- Underlies: Ecca Group
- Overlies: Cape Supergroup, Natal Supergroup, Namaqua-Natal Province, Archean basement rocks

Lithology
- Primary: Diamictite, tillite, claystone, mudstone
- Other: Quartzite, sandstone shale

Location
- Coordinates: 26.0°S 29.5°E
- Approximate paleocoordinates: 76.2°S 52.2°W
- Region: Western, Northern Cape, Free State, North West, Limpopo, Eastern Cape, and KwaZulu-Natal
- Country: South Africa; Namibia; Botswana; Zimbabwe

Type section
- Named for: Dwyka
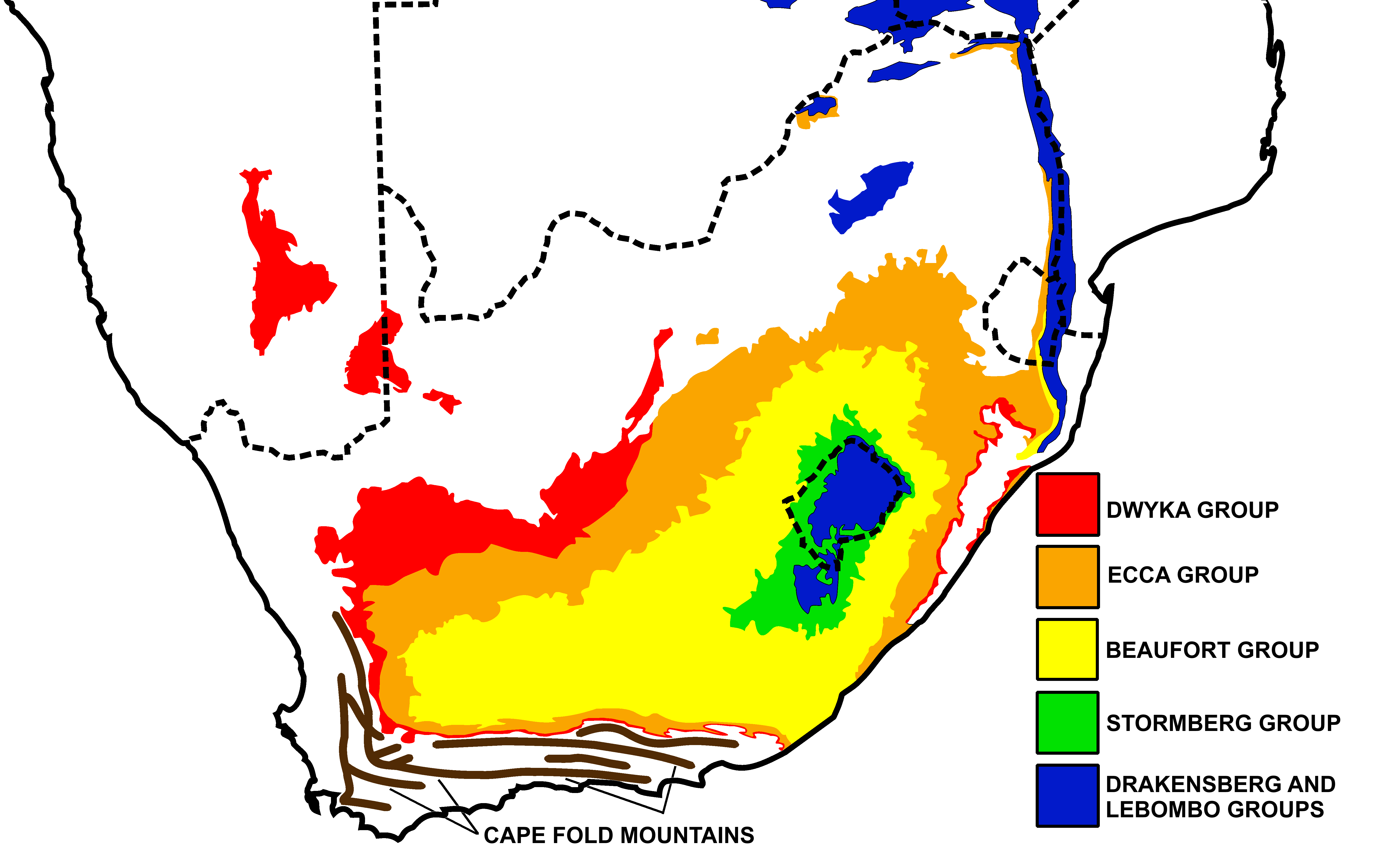
- A simplified geological map of the outcrops of Karoo Supergroup rocks in Southern Africa. The Dwyka Group deposits are represented by the red key on the map

The Dwyka Group is one of four geological groups that compose the Karoo Supergroup. It is the lowermost geological group and heralds the commencement of sedimentation of the Karoo Supergroup. Based on stratigraphic position, lithostratigraphic correlation and palynological analyses, these lowermost Karoo strata range between the Late Carboniferous (Pennsylvanian) to Early Permian in age.

== Background ==
At the commencement of the deposition of the Dwyka Group, it is thought that the development of the Karoo supergroup foreland system had begun approximately 30 million years prior. This foreland system was caused by crustal uplift that had previously begun to take course due to the subduction of the Palaeo-pacific plate beneath the Gondwanan plate. This resulted in the rise of the Gondwanide mountain range in what is known as the Gondwanide orogeny. The continuation of the orogenic pulses from the growing Gondwanides mountain chain and associated subduction created accommodation space for sedimentation in the Karoo Basin which ran along an east to west trending foreland trough. The formation of the Karoo Basin resulted in the preservation of the Dwyka Group rocks and all succeeding rocks that make up the greater Karoo Supergroup. Southern Africa at this time was part of the supercontinent, Gondwana, and was positioned over the antarctic circle at this time. The result was the development of the Permo-Carboniferous glacial environment where massive ice sheets entombed the early Karoo Basin in the surrounding highlands and permanent, floating glaciers in the lowlands.

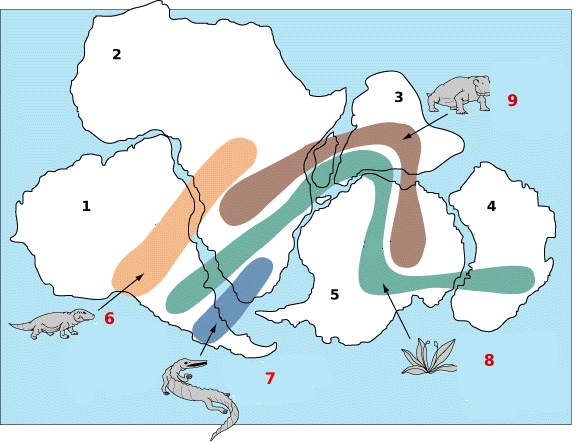
Caption: 1-South-America 2-Africa; 3-India; 4-Australia; 5-Antarctica; 6-Fossil remains of Cynognathus, a Triassic land reptile, approximately 3m long; 7- Fossil remains of the freshwater reptile Mesosaurus; 8-Fossil of the fern Glossopteris found in all of the southern continents show that they were once joined; 9-Fossil evidence of the Triassic land reptile Lystrosaurus

== Geographic extent ==
The geological formations of the Dwyka Group are restricted to the edges of the Karoo Basin and achieve their greatest thickness in its southern deposits at approximately 800 m, progressively thinning out towards the north. In the south outcrops and exposures are known from Prince Albert, Matjiesfontein, Laingsburg, Sutherland, and as far south as Worcester. Western to northern exposures are known from Calvinia, Carnarvon, Kimberley, and then from Vryheid and Durban in the east.

Dwyka Group deposits are also found outside of and north of the Karoo Basin. These deposits found north of the Karoo Basin are found as the lowermost geological formation of the Springbok Flats, Tshipise, northern Lebombo, Tuli, and Ellisras (Lephalale) Basins of north-northeastern South Africa.

In its southern, western, and eastern deposits, the Dwyka Group conformably overlies rocks of the Cape Supergroup, which includes the Cape Fold Belt, and the Natal Supergroup. It also unconformably overlies the Namaqua-Natal Metamorphic Province in some localities in the west-northwest of South Africa. Its north and northeastern Karoo Basin deposits and all deposits found north of the Karoo Basin unconformably overlie the Transvaal Supergroup, Ventersdorp Group, or Archean and Proterozoic basement rocks. In all South African localities, the Dwyka Group underlies rocks of the Ecca Group.

The geographical range of the Dwyka Group is large with its deposits also being found in other localities in southern Africa. Dwyka-aged deposits that are considered to correlate in age to those found in South Africa have been located in the southern Karasburg and Kalahari Basins of southern Namibia – in and around the Fish River Canyon – in the Huab Basin of northern-western Namibia, the Waterberg and Owambo Basins of northern Namibia, the Dukwi Formation of the Kalahari Basin of Botswana, and the Save Basin of southeastern Zimbabwe.

== Stratigraphic units ==
The Dwyka Group deposits have been categorized by those found as part of the Karoo Basin and smaller formations found in different basins north of the Karoo Basin. In the Karoo Basin, the Dwyka Group is known by two distinctive lithological facies. These two facies are represented in its northern and southern deposits respectively and are recognized as the two geological formations below:

- Elandsvlei Formation is the southern facies and it is considered to represent the earliest foredeep deposits of the Karoo foreland system. This portion is restricted to the southern areas of South Africa and is characterized by uniform, high, massive, and clast-poor diamictites and rarer mudrock deposits.

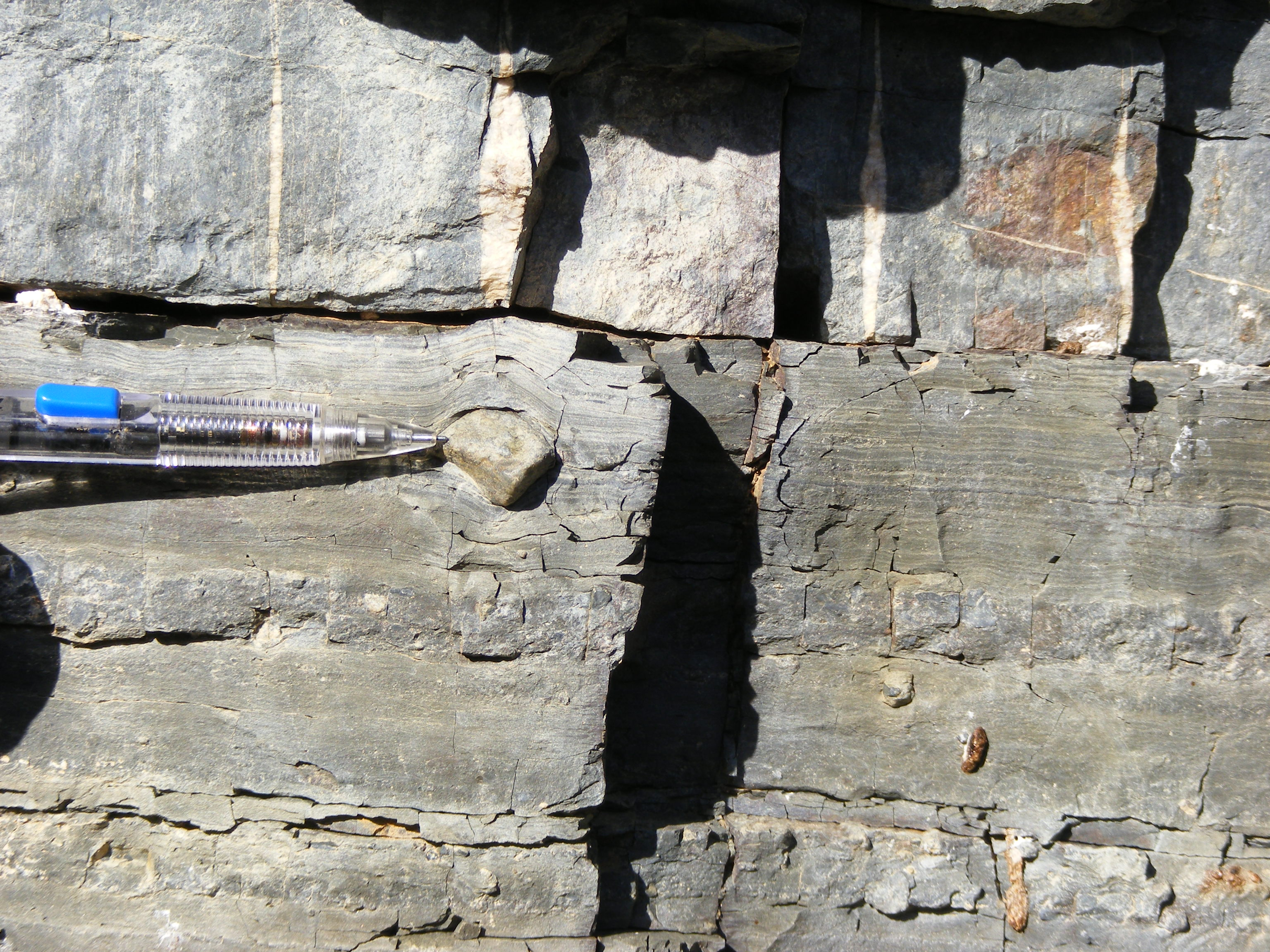
Greenish laminated siltstones of the Elandsvlei Fm, Dwyka Group, near Laingsburg, RSA, containing a solitary pebble which was apparently a dropstone, with thinned laminae draped over the top.

The diamictites are highly compacted and overlie stratified diamictites and mudrocks. The southern facies is interpreted as suspension or melt-out deposits that were deposited in low energy subglacial or subaqueous rain-out from either semi-grounded or floating ice sheets. All sedimentation occurred below the water surface in a deep marine environment. More evidence to support this is that turbidites are often found in Elandsvlei Formation deposits.

- Mbizane Formation is the northern facies and is considered to represent forebulge deposits of the Karoo foreland system. This portion of the formation is restricted to the northern and northeastern sections of the Karoo Basin. It is composed of thinly bedded mudstones and claystones, stratified conglomerates, pebbly sandstones, and diamictites. The clasts were sourced from eroded material from the much older basement rocks and comprise numerous different rock types. These include quarzites, vein quartz, banded ironstone, dolomite, gneiss, granite, and amygdaloidal lavas. It is currently accepted that the northern facies represents valley-fill deposits, proglacial outwash fans, and subglacial till deposits left by continental glaciers retreating towards the south of the early Karoo Basin. Glacial pavements where striation marks are left on the surface of basement rocks are known from this formation in numerous localities.

North of the Karoo Basin outcrops of another geological formation that correlates in age to the main Karoo Basin's Dwyka-aged deposits. This formation is the lowermost unit of the Springbok Flats, Tshipise, northern Lebombo, Tuli, and Ellisras (Lephalale) Basins. This geological formation is recognized and differentiated below due to its unique lithological facies from its main Karoo Basin counterparts:

- Tshidzi Formation : Deposits of this formation represent backbulge basin deposits of the Karoo foreland system. In the Tshipise and Tuli Basins, this formation is known as the Madzaringwe Formation. This formation consists of pebbly mudstones that are interbedded with mainly coarse-grained diamictites. These deposits are considered to be lacustrine facies, which show that the rock sediments were deposited in glacial or periglacial lakes. The northernmost Dwyka Group deposits are considered to have been most proximal to the shoreline of the shallow interior sea that was present at this time in southern Africa.

== Paleontology ==
The Dwyka Group is mainly known for petrified wood which increase in species diversity in the younger sequences. The cold, glacial environment that the sedimentary rocks of the Dwyka Group were deposited in was not conducive for high plant diversity. Fossil wood species identified include lycopods, especially from the Karasburg, Kalahari, and Huab Basins in Namibia. Glossopteris leaf impressions, the petrified remains of Dadoxylon, coprolites, fossil pollen, and trace fossils of bony fishes, crustaceans, and other arthropods have been found from the Dwyka Group and correlated geological formations from other basins.

== See also ==
- Geology of South Africa
- Geography of South Africa
