= Waterberg Coalfield =

Coal deposit in South Africa

- Location within South Africa
- Location: Limpopo, South Africa; 23°40′0″S 27°31′0″E
- Products: Coal

The Waterberg Coalfield is an extensive deposit of coal in the Ellisras Basin in South Africa, lying mostly in the Waterberg District Municipality of the Limpopo province. Mining is increasing, both for export and for local power production, and industry in the region is expected to expand. This may have significant impact on the dry and fragile Limpopo basin ecosystems.

== Resource ==
The Waterberg Coalfield is located in the Limpopo province of South Africa, west of Lephalale. Its dimensions are about 85 kilometres (53 mi) from east to west and about 40 kilometres (25 mi) from north to south. It is part of the same formation as the Mmamabula coalfields in Botswana, to the west. It contains about 40% of South Africa's coal resources. The Waterberg Coalfield has been estimated to hold about 50 billion tons, of which about a quarter could be extracted using opencast mining.

The coal-bearing rocks are in the Grootegeluk Formation within the Karoo Supergroup. They were deposited from 260 to 190 million years ago, and are bounded by the Limpopo Mobile Belt to the north and the Eenzaamheid and Ellisras Faults to the south. The more recent Daarby Fault cuts across the coalfield. The recent covering comes from weathering of Limpopo Mobile Belt gneiss and Karoo rock in the north, and from weathering of the Waterberg sandstones in the south.

Thin layers of coal alternate with layers of mudstones in the Grootegeluk Formation, which is around 70 metres (230 ft) thick. Although some of the resources are near the surface and readily accessible, it may not be economically viable to extract coals from the seams that lie at depths of up to 400 metres (1,300 ft). Due to the thickness of the deposits, providing roof support and preventing spontaneous combustion would be insurmountable problems. A large part of the resource is low grade bituminous, suitable for local power generation but not for export. Other drawbacks to the Waterberg Coalfield include its distance from industrial centers in South Africa, lack of infrastructure in the area and lack of water supplies. Large amounts of water are needed for both the mines and the power stations.

However, the reserve is very large and could potentially be mined for the next 200 years. It seems plausible that industry will move to the region, infrastructure will be developed and ways will be found to bring water from other regions. The Waterberg Coalfield may well replace the Mpumalanga coalfields, which are now reaching peak production.

== Exploitation ==
Coal was found in the Ellisras Basin in 1920, but for many years little was done to explore the resource. During and after World War II, 143 diamond-drill holes and two prospecting shafts were sunk between 1941 and 1952 to obtain a geological map of the Waterberg coalfield. Iscor bought the surface rights on six farms in 1957, and in 1973 began intensive exploration to assess the quantity and quality of coal on this property. Iscor bought the mining lease on the farms in 1979 and established the Grootegeluk Coal Mine in 1980. In 2005 this open-pit colliery was the only coal operation in the coalfield.

As of 2008, Exxaro Resources was operating the Grootegeluk coal mine, supplying Eskom's coal-fired Matimba Power Station. In 2007 Exxaro had obtained a contract to supply Eskom's new Medupi Power Station, which is also in the Waterberg and was due to open in 2012. Because of the shortage of water, the Medupi station will use air-cooled condensers. Sasol is also interested in exploiting the field with a planned new power station called Project Mafutha, which may be located in the Waterberg. A joint venture between the Australian Firestone Energy and the local Sekoko coal is also active in the region.

Exxaro expects to expand exports of high-quality coal through the Port of Richards Bay on the Indian Ocean. In February 2012, the state-owned rail company Transnet stated that they were adding enough capacity to be able to ship an additional 23 million tons of coal a year from the Waterberg Coalfield to Richards Bay. The new Swazilink railway would reduce load on the coal-carrying lines. Transnet was working with the mining companies to ensure that available capacity was being used, and that there was sufficient capacity. This could include long-term contracts to reduce risk on either side.

== Concerns ==
The Waterberg area has huge areas of natural bush, and many game farms. Ecotourism and agriculture are important economic activities. There are very limited resources of groundwater. Other coal mining operations have polluted aquifers, and this must be avoided. There is danger of self-heating or spontaneous combustion from dumps of waste coal, releasing toxic gases. Deposition of waste products released into the atmosphere will affect the Limpopo basin ecosystem, which contains some unique species which existence is already endangered. Growth of the human population, with new housing and new agricultural operations may add more stress. Mine and power station design and operation must understand these impacts and include measures to minimize the impact.

On the other hand, many of the local people are unskilled and unemployed. Development of the coalfields and related chemical industries, with improvements to infrastructure, education and health services could provide large benefits if managed correctly.
