= Waterberg =

Waterberg is the name of two different mountains in Southern Africa, one in the Limpopo Province of South Africa, and one in the Otjozondjupa Region of Namibia.
It may further refer to:

- Waterberg Biosphere in South Africa
- Waterberg Coalfield, an extensive deposit of coal in South Africa
- Waterberg District Municipality in South Africa
- Waterberg Plateau Park, a national park in central Namibia on the Waterberg Plateau, 68 km east of Otjiwarongo
- Battle of Waterberg (1904), the decisive battle during the German campaign against the Herero people
