= Sturmanite =

Rare sulfate mineral

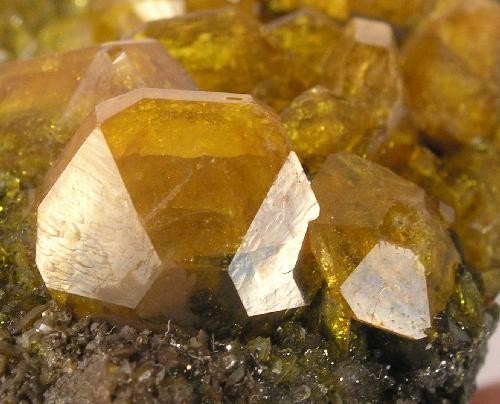
- Distinctive sturmanite on matrix from the N'Chwaning Mines. Size: 5.4 x 4.2 x 1.7 cm. Ex.Charlie Key Stock

General
- Category: Sulfate minerals
- Formula: Ca_{6}Fe^{3+}_{2}(SO_{4})_{2.5}[B(OH)_{4}](OH)_{12} · 25 H_{2}O
- IMA symbol: Strm
- Strunz classification: 7.DG.15
- Dana classification: 32.4.4.2
- Crystal system: Trigonal
- Crystal class: 3m - Ditrigonal Pyramidal
- Space group: P31c (no. 159)
- Unit cell: a = 11.188(9) Å, c = 21.91(7) Å

Identification
- Color: Bright yellow to amber
- Crystal habit: Hexagonal, pyramidal, prismatic
- Cleavage: Perfect {1010}
- Tenacity: Brittle
- Mohs scale hardness: 2.5
- Luster: Vitreous, greasy
- Streak: Pale yellow, greenish yellow, brownish orange
- Diaphaneity: Transparent to translucent
- Specific gravity: 1.847 (measured) 1.855 (calculated)
- Optical properties: Uniaxial (+/-)
- Birefringence: δ = 0.002
- Ultraviolet fluorescence: none

Sturmanite is a rare sulfate mineral with the chemical formula Ca_{6}Fe^{3+}_{2}(SO_{4})_{2.5}(B(OH)_{4})(OH)_{12} · 25 H_{2}O. It crystallises in the tetragonal system and it has a Moh's hardness of 2.5. Sturmanite has a bright yellow to amber colour and falls in the ettringite group. It was named after Bozidar Darko Sturman (1937-2019), Croatian-Canadian mineralogist and Curator Emeritus of Mineralogy, Royal Ontario Museum.

== Occurrence ==
Sturmanite was first identified in 1983 and approved by the IMA in the same year. It was first found in the Black Rock mine, Black Rock, Kalahari manganese field, Northern Cape Province, South Africa. It is found as flattened dipyramidal crystals on hematite and baryte. Sturmanite has also been identified in mines near the Black Rock Mine, such as the Wessel's and Perth mines, in the N'Chwaning mines, and near Lakargi Mountain in Russia. It is found as a rare secondary mineral embedded in manganese deposits and is associated with baryte, manganite, hausmannite, and hematite.

== Crystal structure ==
The crystal structure of sturmanite shows two distinct features: one being columns of iron-octahedra and calcium polyhedra, the other being the SO_{4}^{−} and B(OH)_{4}^{−} tetrahedra surrounding these columns. These two structures are linked together through a dense and complex network of hydrogen bonds.
