= Black Royalty Minerals =

- Company type: Private
- Industry: Mining
- Founded: 2014; 12 years ago in South Africa
- Founder: Ndavhe Mareda
- Headquarters: Johannesburg, South Africa
- Area served: South Africa
- Key people: Ndavhe Mareda (Chairman)
- Products: Coal, Raw material
- Production output: 100,000 tons/month (Chilwavhusiku Colliery); 3.5 million tonnes/year (Koornfontein Coal Mine)
- Services: Raw material extraction
- Owner: Makole Group
- Number of employees: 350 (2018)
- Parent: Makole Group
- Subsidiaries: Koornfontein coal mine, Chilwavhusiku Colliery
- Website: blackroyalty.co.za

Black Royalty Minerals is a South African coal mining company and a subsidiary of Makole Group. The company operates the Chilwavhusiku Colliery in Bronkhorstspruit and the Koornfontein coal mine in Mpumalanga. CNBC Africa has reported that the company is 100% black-owned.

== History ==
Black Royalty Minerals was established as a subsidiary of Makole Group to enter the coal mining industry. The company began operations at the Chilwavhusiku Colliery in January 2018. In 2019, it acquired the Koornfontein Coal Mine, formerly owned by Tegeta Exploration and Resources.

== Operations ==
=== Chilwavhusiku Colliery ===
The Chilwavhusiku Colliery, located in Bronkhorstspruit, was launched in 2018 as the first coal mine in the area. It has a production capacity of 100,000 tons per month and primarily extracts coal from Seam Two, which ranges from 6 to 12 meters in thickness. The mine is 100% black-owned.

=== Koornfontein Coal Mine ===
The company expanded its mining operations in 2019 with the acquisition of the Koornfontein Coal Mine. The Koornfontein Coal Mine has an open-pit strip mine and two underground mining sections, Gloria and Blinkpan. It also features a coal processing plant with a capacity of 3.5 million tonnes per year and a railway siding with rapid loading capabilities to facilitate coal transportation. Black Royalty Minerals exports coal from the mine through the Richards Bay Coal Terminal.

== Economic development ==
The company employs over 80% of its workforce sourced from the communities surrounding its mines. It supports Broad-Based Black Economic Empowerment (BBBEE) through procurement policies favoring black-owned businesses. The company has also undertaken community initiatives, including agricultural projects and business training programmes.

During the COVID-19 pandemic, the company donated medical supplies, testing kits and food parcels, to support local communities. In 2019, it launched the Mining Academic Programme to support high school learners in Tshwane. The programme was endorsed by Gwede Mantashe, the Minister of Mineral Resources and Energy.

== Legal disputes ==
Black Royalty Minerals was selected as the preferred bidder for the Koornfontein coal mine in late 2019 following a competitive bidding process. Lurco Group, had submitted a higher bid of R500 million compared to Black Royalty Minerals' R300 million offer and challenged the decision. Lurco argued that a revised requirement, stipulating that the full purchase price be deposited into a South African bank account within five days, was introduced after the approval of the original business rescue plan and should not be enforced. The business rescue practitioners (BRPs) maintained that the condition was implemented based on creditor instructions and was legally binding.

In January 2020, Lurco, along with Charles King SA and Westdawn Investments, filed an urgent interdict in the South Gauteng High Court to prevent the transfer of the mine to Black Royalty Minerals. On 28 January 2020, the court ruled in favor of Black Royalty Minerals, dismissing all interdict applications with costs. The court upheld the business rescue practitioners' decision, concluding that Black Royalty Minerals had legally fulfilled the revised conditions, while Lurco and its partners had failed to provide the required proof of funds within the stipulated timeframe.

In November 2024, the High Court of South Africa ruled against Black Royalty Minerals Koornfontein (Pty) Ltd in a dispute over modular buildings at the Koornfontein Mine, ordering the company to return the buildings and pay punitive costs.

== Sustainibility ==
The company has implemented dust control, groundwater monitoring, and advanced blasting techniques to minimize environmental impact at its mines. These measures include water bowsers, grass-covered stockpiles, electronic detonation, and through-seam blasting.

== See also ==
- Coal in South Africa
- Mining industry of South Africa
- List of mines in South Africa
