= Matimba Power Station =

Coal-fired power plant in South Africa

Matimba kobedi Power Station
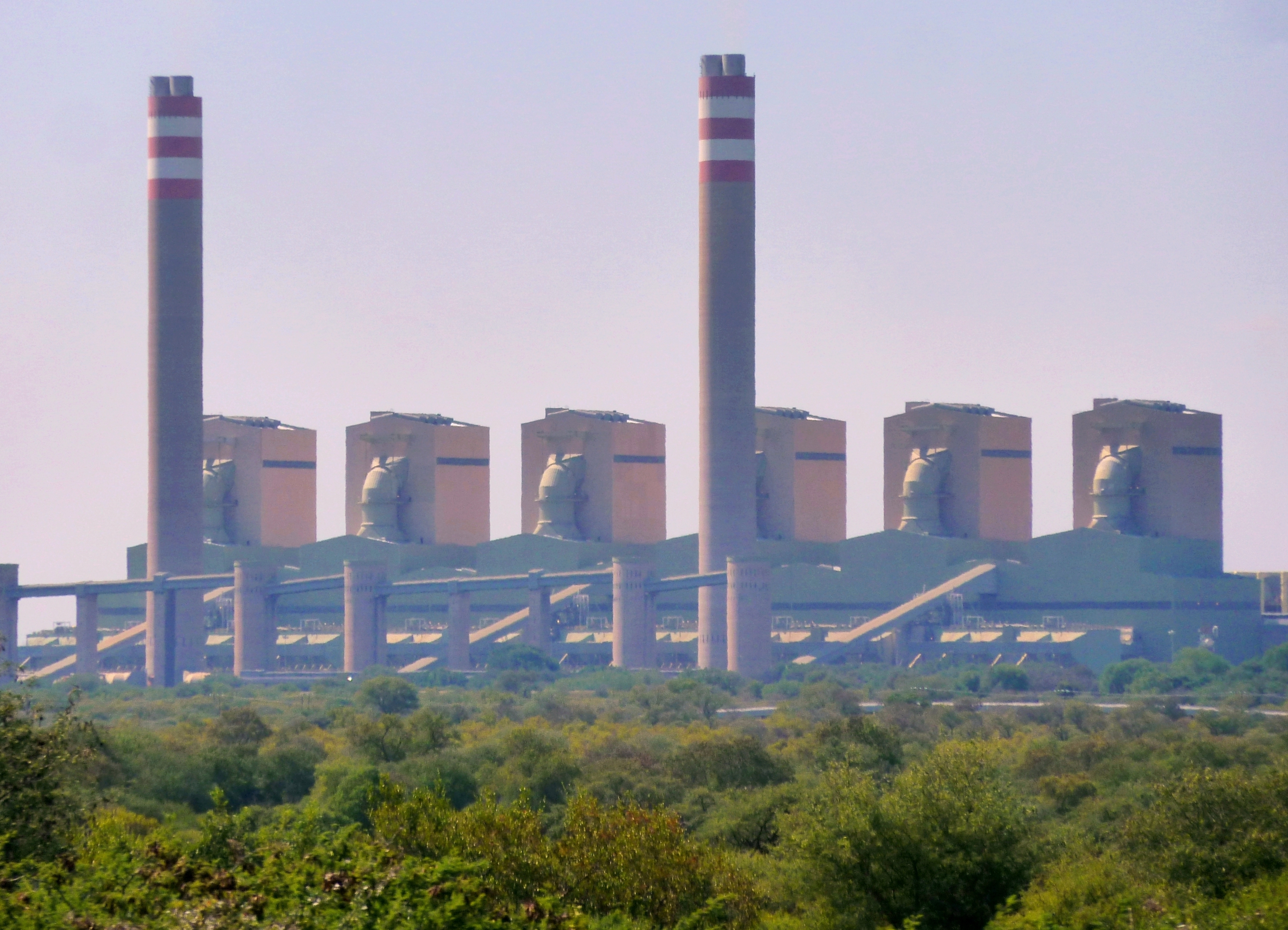
- Location of Matimba Babomba Power Station in South Africa
- Country: South Africa
- Location: Limpopo
- Coordinates: 23°40′6″S 27°36′38″E
- Owner: Eskom
- Operator: Eskom

Thermal power station
- Primary fuel: Coal

Power generation
- Units operational: 6
- Nameplate capacity: 3,990 megawatts

External links
- Commons: Related media on Commons

Matimba Power Station close to Ellisras, Limpopo Province, South Africa, is a dry-cooled coal-fired power plant operated by Eskom.

== Power generation ==
The station consists of six 665 MW units with a total installed capacity of 3,990 MW. The turbine's maximum continuous rating is 35.60%. The power station was commissioned between 1988 and 1993. Matimba is the largest direct dry-cooled power station in the world. The use of dry-cooling technology has considerably reduced water consumption at the plant relative to those using wet-cooling systems.

Matimba is fueled by the open-cast Grootegeluk coal mine on the Waterberg Coalfield with about 14.6 million tons of coal a year via a conveyor system. The mine is also contracted to supply the new Medupi Power Station.

== See also ==
- Eskom
- Fossil-fuel power plant
- List of power stations in South Africa
