= Ellisras Basin =

Geological feature in Africa

- Stratigraphic range: Karoo Supergroup
- Type: Structural basin

Location
- Coordinates: 23.67°S 27.52°E
- Country: Botswana; South Africa

The Ellisras Basin is a geological basin that spans the border between South Africa and Botswana, extending west from the town of Lephalale (formerly Ellisras) in Limpopo province. Basin fill consists of sedimentary rocks of the Karoo Supergroup, with maximum thickness of 1,500 metres (4,900 ft).

The principal economic resources in the basin are the Waterberg Coalfield in South African and the Mmamabula coalfields in Botswana.

== Location ==
The Ellisras Basin is about 320 kilometres (200 mi) north of the main Karoo Basin. It extends east from the Kalahari Basin that underlies much of Botswana. The South African portion of the Ellisras basin is about 90 kilometres (56 mi) from east to west and 35 kilometres (22 mi) from north to south. The portion in Botswana extends much further to the north and south.

== Structure ==
The basin formed at the same time as the Karoo Supergroup, and is around 310 to 180 million years old. It has the asymmetrical cross-section typical of a half-graben, bounded on the north side by a fault zone that slopes steeply down to the axis of the basin, while the southern side slopes down more gently. On the north it is bounded by the Melinda Fault Zone (MFZ), a zone of block faulting in the highly deformed and metamorphosed Archean-age rocks of the Limpopo Belt. The Eenzaamheid Fault Zone defines the southern boundary of the basin, where basin sediments abut older coarse-grained sandstones and minor mudstones in the Waterberg Group.

There is an unconformity where the Karoo rocks of the basin overlie much older rocks. The southern flank of the basin is underlain by Waterberg Group rocks, which form between two-thirds and three-fourths of the basin floor. Mafic rocks of the Limpopo Belt underlie the basin floor in the northeast. The Bushveld Complex underlies the basin in the southeast.

== Stratigraphy ==
There are few bedrock exposures in the Ellisras Basin; in most of the area, the relatively flat-lying sedimentary rock is covered by sands and soils. Accordingly, basin stratigraphy has been investigated primarily by drilling.

Basin deposits reach their maximum thickness in the eastern portion of the basin, where the Karoo Supergroup is as much as 1,500 metres (4,900 ft) thick; thickness decreases to the west.

In the Ellisras Basin, the Dwyka Group (late Carboniferous to Permian) at the base of the Karoo System is represented by the Waterkloof Formation, diamictite and other rocks of colluvial and glaciofluvial origin, associated with meltwater or floating ice from the Karoo glaciation that produced the Dwyka Group tillite in the main Karoo Basin. Some sources also identify the overlying Wellington Formation, predominantly a mudstone, as a Dwyka Group equivalent.

The Ecca Group, the second of the four groups in the Karoo Supergroup, is represented by the Wellington (alternatively assigned to the Dwyka Group), Swartrant (Vryheid Formation equivalent), and Grooteguluk Formations. The Swartrant Formation is predominantly mudstone derived from a mafic source. It includes some coal. A 2-m-thick tonstein layer forms the base of the overlying Grootegeluk Formation, a 70- to 80-m thick unit that consists primarily of alternating layers of mudstone and coal. Grootegeluk Formation mudstone is primarily of a granodiorite composition, indicating that it was derived from different sediment source than the Swartrant Formation mudstone.

Above the Grootegeluk Formation is the Eendragtpan Formation. This is a mudstone unit similar in composition to the Grootegeluk Formation mudstones, but it does not contain coal or other organic matter and is assigned to the Beaufort Group. The Stormberg Group is represented in the Ellisras Basin by the Greenwich Formation (about 30 m thick; possibly equivalent to the Molteno Formation in the Karoo Basin), Lisbon Formation (about 100 m thick; equivalent to the Elliot Formation), and the Clarens Formation (about 120 m thick).

In the Ellisras Basin, the Drakensberg flood basalts that cap the Karoo stratigraphic sequence are represented by a 75-m basalt section with a potassium-argon age of 179 million (+/–5 million) years. The basalt is of a low Ti-Zr type, similar to basalts found in Springbok Flats, central Botswana and Lesotho.

The most recent cover in the north comes from weathering of the gneiss of the Limpopo Mobile Belt and the Karoo rock, and in the south comes from weathering of the Waterberg sandstones.

== Resource potential ==
Ellisras basin is of economic interest due to the presence of the Waterberg Coalfield, which is expected to become the most important coal resource in South Africa, although as of 2009 only the Grootegeluk Coal Mine was operational. Extensive exploration is also being done in the Botswana portion of the basin, where the basin hosts the Mmamabula coalfield.

The Waterberg Coalfield deposits are contained in the Grootegeluk Formation, and may account for over 50% of South Africa's coal reserves. Mining and utilisation of the coal is expected to be constrained by its depth, high ash content, and structural complexity. Additionally, severe limitations on water availability in the area could restrict activities that require large amounts of water, including mining and the processing of high-ash-content coal.

There is interest in the potential for coalbed methane development from deep coal beds in the Ellisras Basin, particularly in the northeastern parts of the basin where the Grootgeluk Formation coal is found at depths greater than 300 metres (980 ft). The high vitrinite content of the coal indicates a significant potential for coalbed methane production. The methane resource in the basin has been estimated to total one trillion cubic feet (28 billion cubic meters) of gas, but this estimate is based on very little data. As of 2011, the Anglo Operations mining group had begun investigating the basin's methane potential by drilling more than 70 wells and conducting production tests.
