= Vaal River mine =

Mine in South Africa

- Location: Gauteng, South Africa
- Products: uranium

The Vaal River mine is a large mine located in the northern part of South Africa in Gauteng. Vaal River represents one of the largest uranium reserves in South Africa having estimated reserves of 379.2 million tonnes of ore grading 0.0076% uranium.

== See also ==
- List of mines in South Africa
