= Middelplaats mine =

Manganese mine in South Africa

- Location: Northern Cape, South Africa
- Products: Manganese

The Middelplaats mine is a mine located in the west of South Africa in Northern Cape. Middelplaats represents one of the largest manganese reserves in South Africa, having estimated reserves of 52 million tonnes of manganese ore, grading 38% manganese metal.

== See also ==
- List of mines in South Africa
