= D'nyala Nature Reserve =

Protected area in South Africa

D'nyala Nature Reserve, lies just 15 kilometres south east of Lephalale, in the Limpopo, province of South Africa, and is about 8.000 Ha in area. It is named after the huge and lovely Nyala tree (Latin: Xanthocercis zambesiaca) that grows in the area up to 30 metres high with massive gnarled and crooked trunks from which its leaves grow directly. On the west is the Mogol River and on the east the Tamboti River. The reserve was used from 1989 until 1992 for discussions between the Apartheid government of FW de Klerk and the ANC.

== Wildlife ==
Include: white rhino, giraffe, waterbuck, zebra, tsessebe, eland and others, and there are a variety of predators like the brown hyena, jackal and smaller cats. The nyala antelope and the brown hyena are other members of the mammalian population of the reserve, which totals 60.

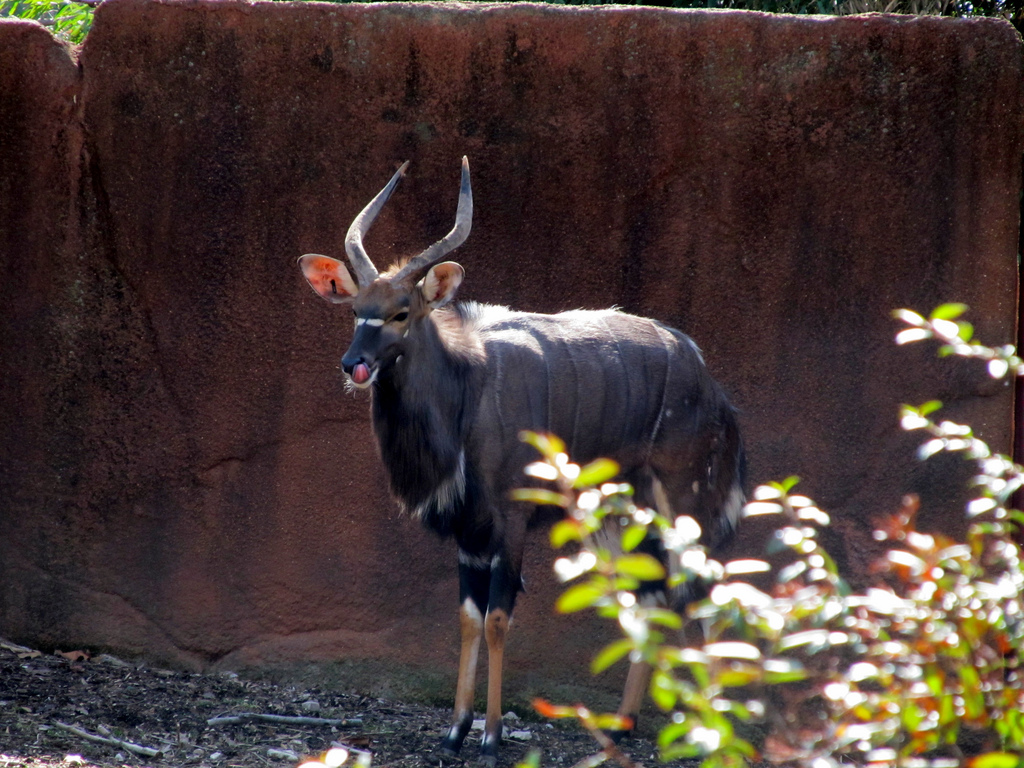
Nyala

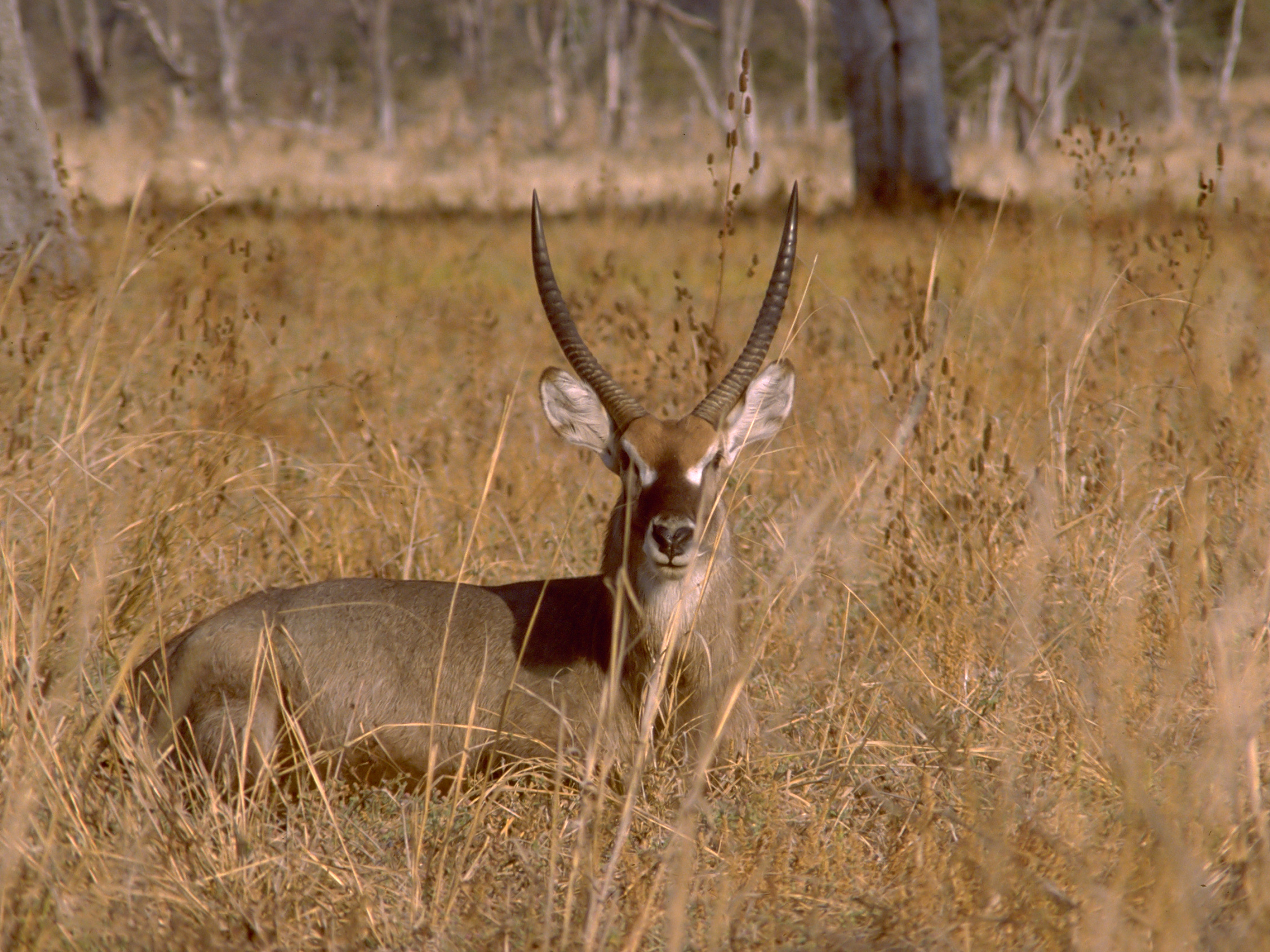
Waterbuck

== Vegetation ==
The reserve contains some magnificent specimens of the Baobab tree.

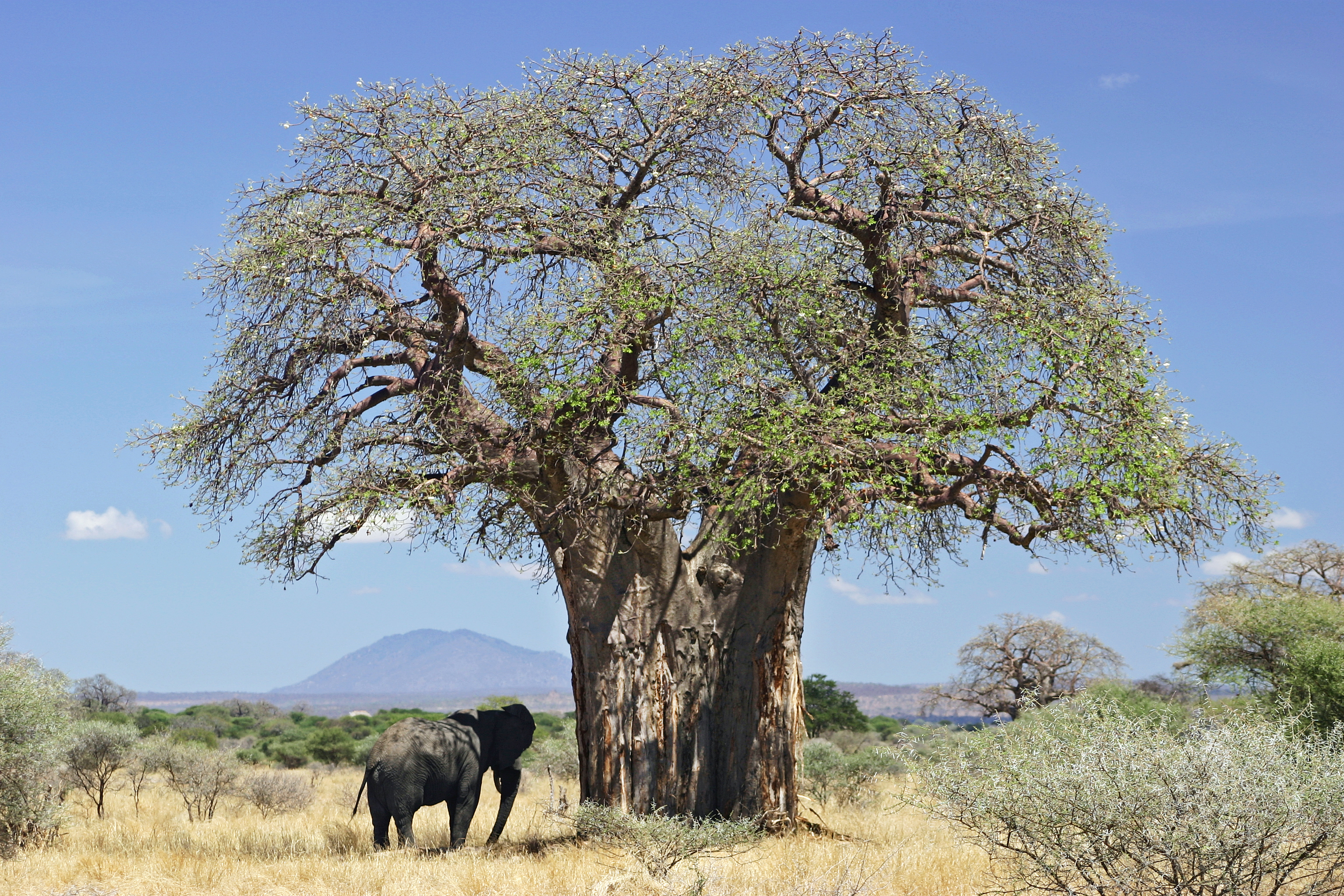
A Baobab tree

== See also ==
- Protected areas of South Africa
