= Denny Dalton mine =

Uranium mine in South Africa

- Location within South Africa
- Location: Gauteng, South Africa; 28°16′0.01″S 31°16′0.01″E
- Products: uranium

The Denny Dalton mine is a large mine located in the northern part of South Africa in Gauteng. Denny Dalton represents one of the largest uranium reserves in South Africa having estimated reserves of 31.2 million tons of ore grading 0.03% uranium.

== See also ==
- List of mines in South Africa
