= Grootegeluk Coal Mine =

Mine in Limpopo, South Africa

- Location within South Africa
- Location: Limpopo, South Africa; 23°40′18″S 27°31′44″E
- Products: Coal
- Production: 18.8 Mtpa final coal products
- Company: Exxaro
- Acquired: 1980

The Grootegeluk Coal Mine is an open cast coal mine within the Waterberg Coalfield of the Limpopo province of South Africa. It is operated by Exxaro. The mine is 25 kilometres (16 mi) from Lephalale, and employs 2,000 people.

== Discovery ==
In 1920, coal was found in the Ellisras Basin, but at first little was done to investigate the size of the resource. Between 1941 and 1952, 143 diamond-drill holes and two prospecting shafts were sunk to obtain a geological map of the Waterberg coalfield. In 1957 Iscor (later unbundled into Kumba Resources and Mittal Steel South Africa) bought surface rights on six farms located in the coalfield. In 1973 Iscor began detailed exploration of the deposits below the farms to determine the quality and quantity of coal. In 1979 Iscor obtained the mining leases on the farms and in 1980 established the Grootegeluk Coal Mine.

The mine contains semi-soft coking coal, thermal coal and metallurgical coal. There is estimated to be 2,800 Mt of accessible coal out of a total measured resource of 4,600 Mt of coal. A 19-metre (62 ft) overburden covers 94.7 metres (311 ft) of usable coal, which is interspersed with three dirt bands that total 13.4 metres (44 ft) in thickness. The raw coal has less than 25% of burnable substance.

== Operation ==
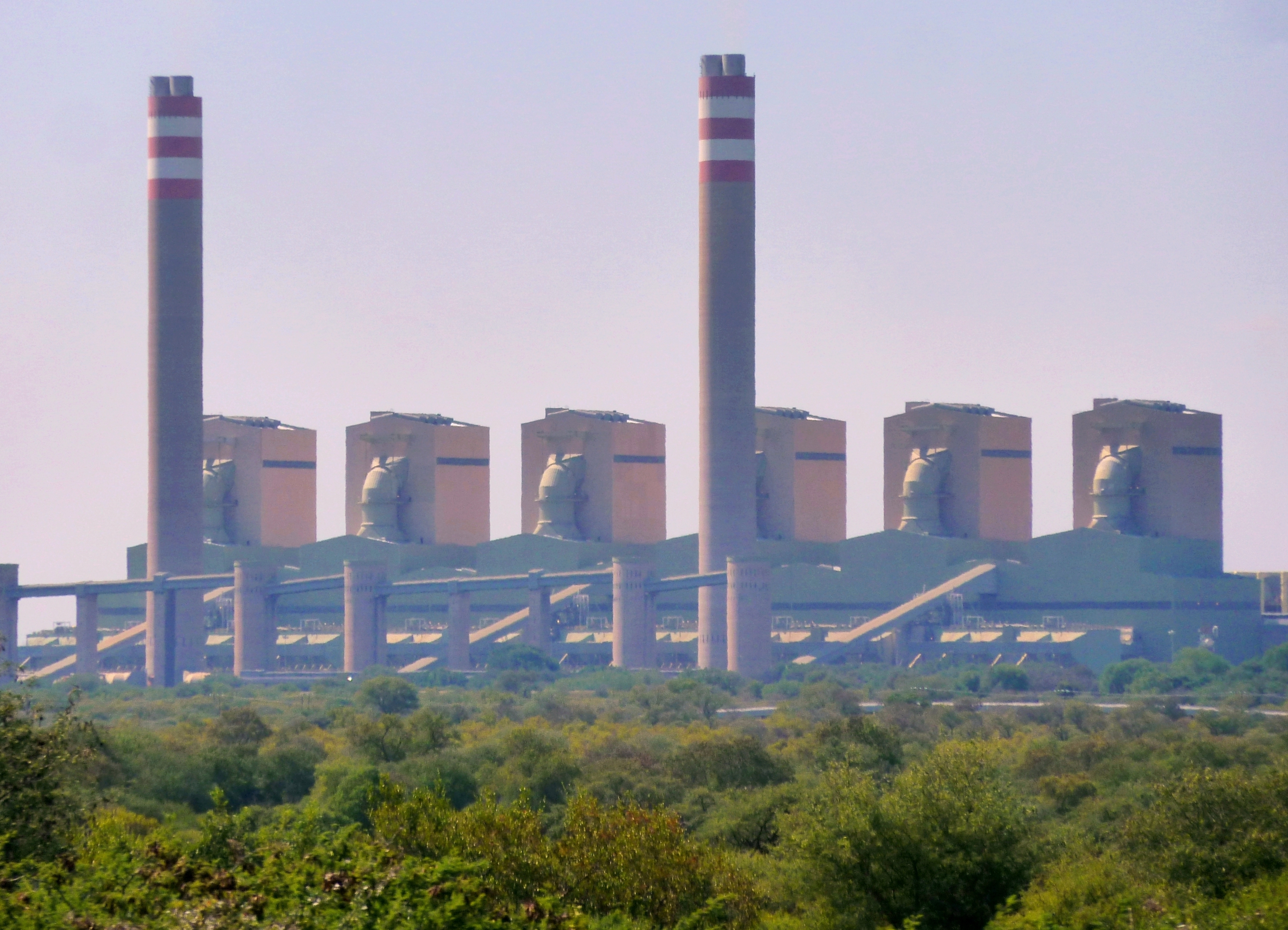

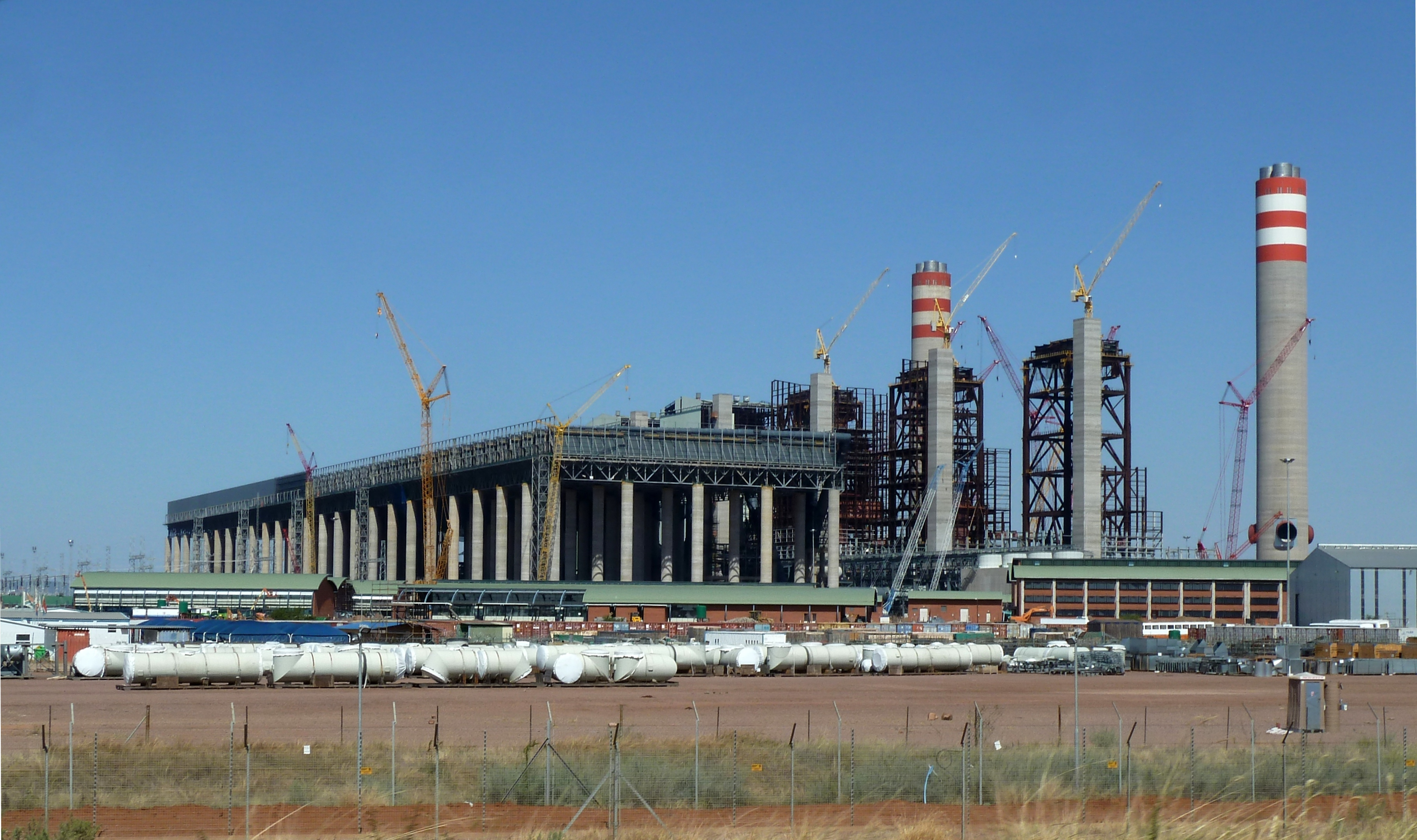
The coal for Matimba and Medupi power stations is extracted and processesed by Grootegeluk mine.

In 2005 the Grootegeluk open-pit colliery was the only coal operation in the Waterberg coalfield. The mine employed almost 2,000 people to produce 14.5 million tons of coal annually. Of these employees, only a very small percentage were managers, in part because of a severe shortage of management skills in South Africa. The miners blast the 15-metre (49 ft) high benches, then excavate the broken coal and truck it to the concentration plant. The mine uses trolley-assist trucks to reduce fuel and maintenance costs and increase productivity. The major fleet of 20 x Komatsu Haulpak 730E's utilize the trolley assist feature as well as a subsidiary fleet of Hitachi EH4500 and EH3500 trucks. The trolley assist trucks are powered by DC electricity from overhead catenary lines at 1200V.

The Grootegeluk plant uses horizontal belt vacuum filtration to dewater fines. The mine has the world's largest coal beneficiation facility, with six plants that upgrade 8,000 tonnes per hour of run-of-mine coal. The new plant installed to extract and process coal for the new Medupi Power Station will be the first in the world to use mobile tipping bins and crushers in the pit near the benches. This equipment will advance as the mine advances. To minimize production stoppages, there will be run-of-mine stockpiles between the pit and the plant. Stockpiles will also be used between the plant and the discard dump stackers. The plant will use dry screening to avoid having to pump tailings to tailings dams.

The waste material from the Grootegeluk mine, particularly from the lower levels, is prone to spontaneous combustion. Various experiments have been conducted to discover the best way to cover this material as the mine is back-filled so as to minimize the risk. A concern is that the covering will become less effective as it absorbs oxygen.

== Output ==
The mine produces 18.8 Mt of final coal products annually. As of 2008, Exxaro was supplying Eskom's coal-fired Matimba Power Station. Exxaro delivered 14.8 Mt annually of power station coal to the Matimba power station via a 7-kilometre (4.3 mi) conveyor belt. Grootegeluk produces 1.5 Mt of metallurgical coal for sale to metals industries and other users in South Africa annually. Exxaro exports or sells to domestic customers about 1Mt of thermal and semi-soft coking coal. The mine produces 2.5 Mt of semi-soft coking coal annually, delivering most of it to Mittal SA by rail. In the late 2000s the rail link to the Grootegeluk mine was being upgraded. Exxaro expects to expand exports of high-quality coal through the Port of Richards Bay.

In 2007 Exxaro announced a contract to supply Eskom's new Medupi Power Station, which is also in the Waterberg and was due to open in 2012. The contract was finalized in December 2008. Exxaro was to invest R9 billion to speed up extraction from the existing pit, with delivery of coal to the first generation unit at Medupi to start in the 3rd quarter of 2011. Two new dense media coal beneficiation plants were to be built at the mine, and would be operating at full capacity by 2014. They would supply the Medupi generators with about 14.6 Mt of power station-grade coal annually for the next forty years. The expansion will create about 550 permanent jobs at Grootegeluk.
