= Kusile Power Station =

Coal-fired power plant in South Africa

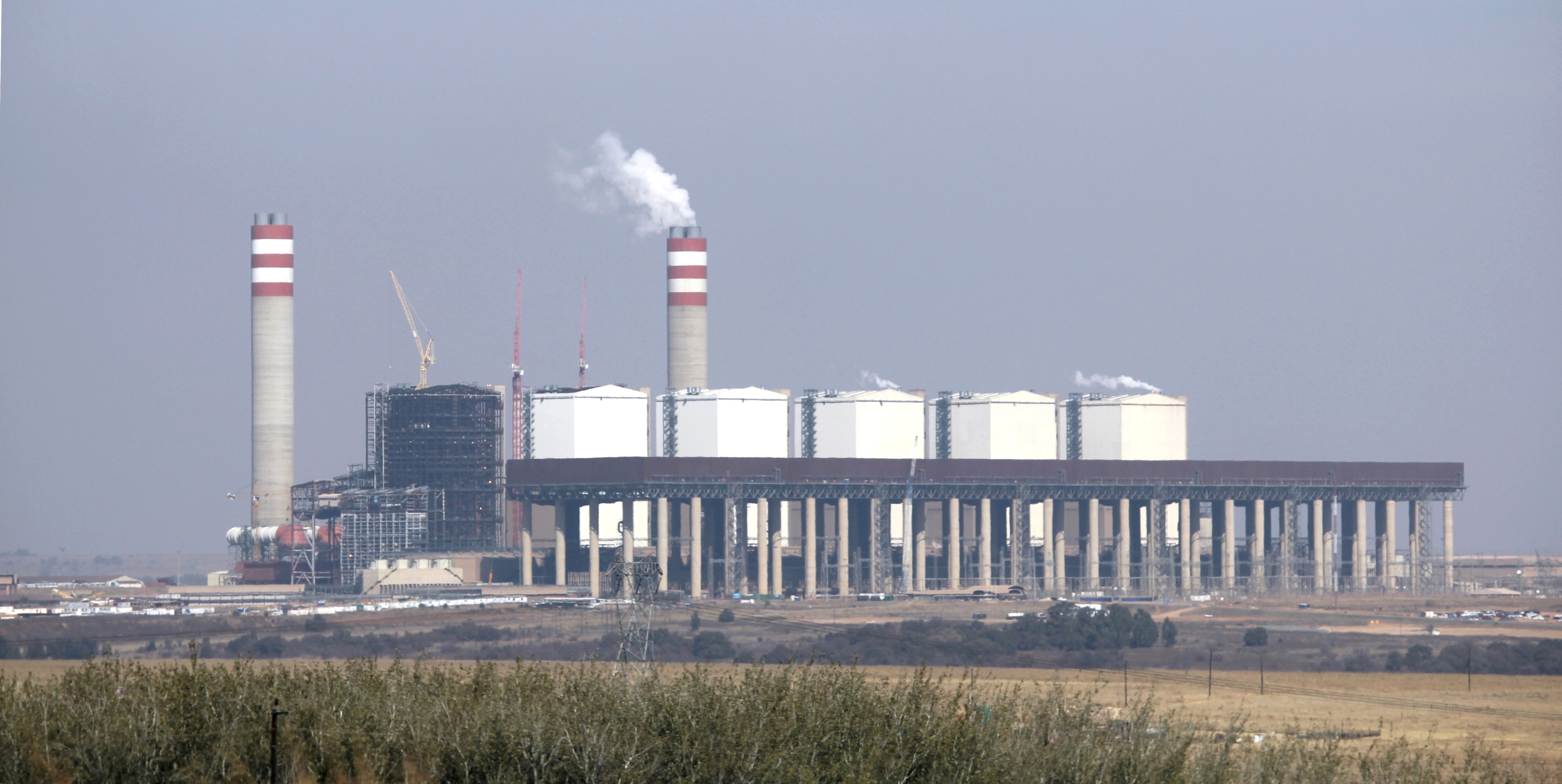
- Kusile seen from the N4 freeway in 2019
- Country: South Africa
- Location: Witbank, Emalahleni Local Municipality, Mpumalanga
- Coordinates: 25°54′59″S 28°55′02″E
- Status: Commissioned
- Construction began: 2008
- Commission date: 10 March 2017
- Construction cost: R233 billion (US$15.76 billion)
- Owner: Eskom
- Operator: Eskom

Thermal power station
- Primary fuel: Coal

Power generation
- Units operational: 6 × 800 MW
- Make and model: Alstom steam turbines and Hitachi supercritical boilers
- Units cancelled: 0
- Units decommissioned: 0
- Nameplate capacity: 4,800 MW
- Capacity factor: 66.6 percent

External links
- Commons: Related media on Commons

Kusile Power Station (previously known as Project Bravo) in South Africa is a coal-fired power plant owned and operated by the country's state-owned power utility Eskom and is located in the province of Mpumalanga. The station consists of 6 generating units with a nameplate capacity of 800 MW each, bringing the total installed capacity to 4,800 MW.

As of 23 March 2025, all 6 units of Kusile are operational (6 × 800MW).

Following the addition of Unit 6 to the grid, Kusile Power Station was described as "the most expensive coal power plant in the history of mankind" due to the fact that the project went way over budget and was completed way later than its expected date of completion.

== Location ==
Kusile Power Station is located about 15 kilometres north of the existing Kendal Power Station near Witbank, Mpumalanga.

== Concept ==
Kusile Power Station consists of six 800-megawatt coal-fired generating units for a total generating capacity of 4,800 megawatts. In 2023, the realistic sustainable output per unit however projected to be some 350 megawatts.

In December 2023, Unit 5 was synchronised to the national grid. Following a six-month period of testing and optimisation, the unit's output will be commercially commissioned and bring total station output to 4,000 MW. Kusile was the first coal power station in Eskom's fleet to be fitted with flue gas desulphurisation technology.

On 23 March 2025 at 16:45 SAST(14:45 UTC), Unit 6 was synchronised to the national grid, bringing the nameplate capacity of Kusile to 4,800 MW.

=== Project engineer ===
Black and Veatch was appointed as the project engineer for construction.

=== Main equipment suppliers ===
Alstom provided the steam turbines, whilst Hitachi provided the super critical boilers.

== Coal supply ==
The power utility, Eskom, stated that it "will obtain most of the coal required for this Power Station from Anglo Coal's New Largo operations, south east of the Kusile Power Station."

Eskom's consultants estimated that 35 new coal mines would be required to support the Medupi and Kusile plants.

== Construction timeline ==
Construction started in August 2008, months after the first of South Africa's rolling blackouts in January 2008.

Initially expected to take 6 years to complete, the project completed Unit 1 until 2017 (approximately 8 years after initial works began) and the entire project not until 2021.

- 5 June 2007: Department of Environmental Affairs & Tourism issued a positive Record of Decision.
- February 2008: Hitachi Power Africa awarded the boiler contract worth R18.5 billion.
- February 2008: Alstom S&E awarded the turbine island works contract valued at R13 billion.
- 14 April 2011: Black & Veatch Corp. Awarded approval for $805.6 million in financing from the U.S. Export-Import Bank.
- 31 May 2011: Export-Import Bank of the United States approves $805 million (R5.78 billion) loan.
- October 2014: 300 ton 910 MVA Generator Step-up Transformer placed on its foundation, assembled with all its Auxiliary systems and filled with 128,000 litres of Mineral Oil. All electrical integrity tests were performed successfully to confirm that the transformer was ready to receive power.
- 10 March 2017: Unit 1 achieves commercial power.
- 7 July 2017: Unit 2 was synchronised to the national grid.
- 16 March 2019: Unit 3 was synchronised to the national grid.
- 30 October 2020: Unit 2 reaches commercial operation.
- 31 March 2021: Unit 3 reaches commercial operation.
- 23 December 2021: Unit 4 connected to the national grid.
- 31 May 2022: Unit 4 reaches commercial operation.
- 31 December 2023: Unit 5 connected to the national grid.
- 23 March 2025: Unit 6 connected to the national grid.
- Second half of 2025: Unit 6 is expected to reach commercial operation.
- 29 September 2025: Unit 6 was confirmed to have reached commercial operation by ESKOM.

=== Delays and defects ===
Deficient project management, corruption, labour disputes, vandalism, and absenteeism resulted in low operational efficiency and reliability, which periodically stalled the generation of electricity 15 years after its construction began.

The dates for full commercial operation were shifted numerous times mostly due to:

- Labour disputes:
  - May 2011: Eleven contractor vehicles, seven offices, two large mobile cranes, and the west wing of the KCW office block were set alight, vehicles stoned, and offices and stores looted.
  - February 2014: 1,400 employees were reported absent.
  - 10 August 2018: A fire breaks out at the station amidst tensions with unions over pay increases causing damage.
- Technical issues such as:
  - Boiler design: high temperatures that the spray water-cooling system could not cope with
  - Fabric filter plant: excessive wear of bags, resulting in blockages
  - Coal mills: failed to meet operational requirements, which necessitated a doubling of servicing
  - Flue ducts and resultant damage to chimney: A wet flue gas desulphurisation system between the boiler and chimney, intended to remove harmful sulphur dioxide from emissions at its first desulphurisation stage, where non functioning baghouse filters supposed to capture fly ash from emitted gases failed. This resulted in some of the silica containing fly ash being carried along to the desulphurisation unit. At that stage, hydrated lime sprayed through the emitted gasses to chemically bind with the sulphur dioxide and create calcium sulfite was also mixed with the fly ash and subsequently entered the chimney. When combined with heat and fly ash, a hard crust formed along the inner exhausts of the chimney which over time added too much weight for the structure to support, resulting in damage. The damage to the flue duct and chimney then rendered Units 1, 2 & 3 inoperable. The reason was not a failure of the Bag House Filter but more several contradictions in the contract, shown by Hitachi in deviation requests. The FGD is not designed to take such a high flue gas amount which is required when the Bag House Filter is operated with PAN filter material. The same defect will occur to the Unit 4,5,6 (using the same chimney) within a foreseeable period.

This resulted in Kusile and Medupi considered as some of the worst-performing units in Eskom's fleet. In February 2019, Eskom GM for group technology Titus Mathe reported R8 billion would be needed to fix design defects at Medupi and Kusile.

== Critics ==
The building of this power station attracted various criticism.

=== Interference ===
Hitachi Power Africa, a subsidiary of Hitachi, Ltd., found by the U.S. Securities and Exchange Commission to have made US$6 million in corrupt payments to Chancellor House, a front company for the African National Congress, the ruling political party in South Africa. Hitachi agreed to pay US$19 million to settle charges. Hitachi Power Africa rebranded as Mitsubishi Hitachi Power Systems Africa in February 2014.

=== Cost ===
Kusile Power Station was estimated to cost R118 billion to complete. That would have brought the cost per unit to R19.66bn ($1.34bn) per generating unit, equalling R26.96M ($1.67M) per installed MW. Following completion and synchronisation of Unit 6 to the grid, the final cost to build Kusile was R233 billion (US$15.76 billion); a cost of R48.54 million (US$3.28 million) per MW.

==== Financial institution support ====
The following institutions were involved in supporting the project:

- African Development Bank
- Development Bank of Southern Africa
- Bank of America
- Bank of Tokyo Mitsubishi UFJ (now MUFG Bank)
- Barclays
- BNP Paribas
- Crédit Agricole
- Crédit Industriel et Commercial
- Credit Suisse
- Deutsche Bank
- FirstRand
- HSBC
- JPMorgan Chase
- KfW IPEX-Bank
- Natixis
- Nedbank
- Rand Merchant Bank
- Société Générale
- Standard Bank (South Africa)
- Compagnie Française d'Assurance pour le Commerce Extérieur (COFACE)
- Euler Hermes
- Export–Import Bank of the United States
- Public Investment Corporation (South Africa)

=== Emissions ===
The plant is estimated to emit 36.8 million tonnes of CO_{2}-equivalent per year.

In November 2011, Greenpeace activists chained themselves to a gate and climbed a crane, a few weeks before the country hosted a global conference on climate change. Authorities arrested nine people, on charges of trespassing and malicious damage to property.

The design of the station does allow for the installation of flue gas desulphurisation technology, the first of its kind in South Africa.

=== Inquiry ===
By 2018, the governments Public Enterprises Minister Pravin Gordhan announced a forensic probe into delays and cost overruns on the completion of Kusile and Medupi Control Stations.

=== Corruption controversy ===
In November 2019, South African investigative journalist Pieter-Louis Myburgh published an article in the Daily Maverick detailing an alleged slush fund corruption scandal involving Eskom executives and at least four contractors. The scandal involved contracts worth a combined R10 billion resulting in an estimated R75 million being lost due to irregular activities. By the time of the publication of Myburgh's article the construction of Kusile was five years past its original completion date and an estimated R80 billion (equivalent to US$5.4 billion) over budget.

In Dec 2022, ABB was charged by the U.S. Securities and Exchange Commission (SEC) for violations of the Foreign Corrupt Practices Act (FCPA) in a bribery scheme, where it paid more than $37 million in bribes to a high-ranking Eskom official to influence a $160 million contract awarded by the state-owned electric utility company for work on Kusile's cabling and installation work between 2014 and 2017.

== See also ==
- List of coal power stations
- List of largest power stations in the world
- List of power stations in South Africa
- Medupi Power Station
