= Rietkuil mine =

Mine in Gauteng, South Africa

- Location: Gauteng, South Africa
- Products: uranium

The Rietkuil mine is a large mine located in the northern part of South Africa in Gauteng. Rietkuil represents one of the largest uranium reserves in South Africa, having estimated reserves of 127.8 million tonnes of ore grading 0.043% uranium.

== See also ==
- List of mines in South Africa
