= Sishen mine =

Iron ore mine in Kathu, Northern Cape, South Africa

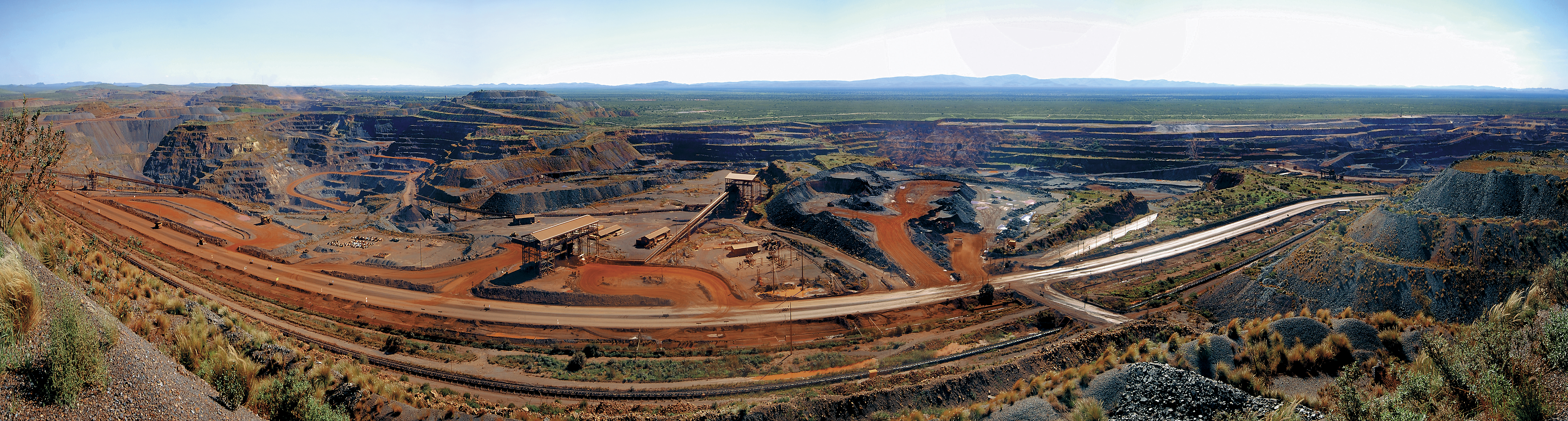
- Panorama of Sishen Mine (2010)
- Interactive map of Sishen mine
- Location: Kathu, Northern Cape, South Africa; 27°45′S 23°00′E
- Products: Iron ore
- Production: 29.2 MT
- Financial year: 2019
- Opened: 1953

The Sishen mine is a large iron mine located in central South Africa in Kathu, Northern Cape. Sishen represents one of the largest iron ore reserves in South Africa and in the world having estimated reserves of 2.43 billion tonnes of ore grading 58.6% iron metal.

The Sishen mine has a geological structure producing a high-grade hematite ore, similar to ores at the Beeshoek mine. There has been an investigation into a region known as the Sishen South exploration project which is 65 km south of the Sishen mine. Hematite mineralization occurs along a strike length of 14 km, with a width of 3.2 km and a maximum vertical extent of 400 m below the original topographic surface.

The Sishen mine was opened in 1947, and produced 30.9 million tonnes of iron ore in 2013. In 2015, the mine produced far less, and quarterly results in 2016 show a decline in output. In 2016, Kumba Iron Ore began the process of cutting nearly 4000 jobs in an attempt to restructure the Sishen mine and ensure profitability.

The Sishen–Saldanha railway line that moves ore from the mines to international markets at the port of Saldanha is notable for its length of 3,780 meters.

== Local Geology ==
The tectonostratigraphy at Sishen reflects a fault-controlled basin or sub-basin, dominated by the Ghaap and Postmasburg Groups of the Transvaal Supergroup, the Gamagara/Mapedi Formation of the Olifantshoek Supergroup and the Karoo Supergroup.

== Mine Ownership ==
The Sishen mine is owned by Kumba Iron Ore, which has a 73% interest in the Sishen Iron Ore Company Proprietary Limited (SIOC). Anglo American plc has a 64.3% stake in Kumba Iron Ore.

Other stakeholders in the Sishen Iron Ore Company include Exxaro Resources Limited and ArcelorMittal SA (Amsa).

In 2009, Sishen Iron Ore applied to take over the remaining 21% of Sishen Mine from ArcelorMittal SA (Amsa) who failed to convert their mining rights before 30 April 2009. The South African Department of Mineral Resources instead granted the rights to ICT, a hitherto unknown mining company with alleged political ties to the government. In 2011, this award was overturned by the courts but in 2013, the overturned judgement was taken to the constitutional court. The final ruling was in favour of Kumba Iron Ore.

In 2015, despite being awarded the 21.4% stake by South African Department of Mineral Resources, Kumba again sought legal recourse due to conditions attached to the ruling. Kumba released a statement in October 2016 announcing their 100% ownership of Sishen mine. Kumba is expected to resume payments to shareholders in 2017 following a rise in iron ore price and employee cutbacks; nearly 4,000 jobs were cut at Kumba's flagship Sishen Iron Ore mine in 2016. As a result, Sishen generated R4.5bn, enough to cover existing debt.
