= Union North mine =

South African platinum mine

- Location: Northam, Limpopo, South Africa
- Products: platinum, palladium, rhodium, ruthenium, gold
- Company: Anglo American Platinum

The Union North mine is a large open pit mine located in the north-western part of South Africa in Northam, Limpopo. Union North represents one of the largest platinum reserves in South Africa having estimated reserves of 6.9 million oz of platinum. The mine produces around 98,000 oz of platinum/year.
