= Lephalale =

Lephalale Ellisras
- Location within Limpopo Location within South Africa
- Coordinates: 23°40′S 27°45′E
- Country: South Africa
- Province: Limpopo
- District: Waterberg
- Municipality: Lephalale

Area
  - Total: 66.94 km^{2} (25.85 sq mi)

Population (2011)
  - Total: 67,000
  - Density: 1,000/km^{2} (2,600/sq mi)

Racial makeup (2011)
  - Black African: 58.0%
  - Coloured: 3.3%
  - Indian/Asian: 1.1%
  - White: 37.2%
  - Other: 0.4%

First languages (2011)
  - Afrikaans: 39.0%
  - Northern Sotho: 22.1%
  - English: 12.0%
  - Tswana: 7.6%
  - Other: 19.2%
- Time zone: UTC+2 (SAST)
- Postal code (street): 0555
- PO box: 0555
- Area code: 014

Lephalale, formerly known as Ellisras, is a coal mining town in the Limpopo province of South Africa immediately east of the Waterberg Coalfield. The town was established as Ellisras in 1960 and named after Patrick Ellis and Piet Erasmus who settled on a farm there in the 1930s. In 2002, Ellisras was renamed Lephalale by the provincial government of Limpopo, after the main river that crosses the municipality. Lephalale is derived from the setswana language meaning "to flow".

== History ==
=== 1550 to 1750 ===
Late Iron Age cattle posts belonging to the Letsibogo ceramic facies have been found in the area. Some rock engravings at Nelsonkop have been recorded.

=== 1930s ===
The name Ellisras originates from a combination of the surnames of Patric Ellis and Piet Erasmus who settled in the 1930s on the farm Waterkloof 502LQ. Since the opening of the main route between Vaalwater and Stockpoort during 1929 a railway bus stop developed on the farm. The central function of the newly established nodes became more evident and other facilities such as schools, churches and shops were established on the farm. Subdivision of the farm started and due to the specific locality of the river, all newly created portions have a river frontage which had a definite influence on the urban form/shape of Ellisras today.

=== 1940s ===
In 1941, the Geological Survey Division of the then Department of Mining, launched an exploration programme. Iscor, the country's largest steel producer, and also the biggest consumer of coking coal, actively participated in this programme.

=== 1950s ===
Drilling was completed in 1952. In 1957, Iscor obtained the surface rights to six farms, including Grootegeluk.

=== 1960s ===
The first townships that were proclaimed in Ellisras were: Ellisras (Proper) - 7 December 1960 Ellisras Extension 1–5 May 1965 Ellisras Extension 2–3 November 1971

=== 1970s ===
A major influence on the growth of the farm Waterkloof 502LQ was the decision of Iscor in 1973 to continue with the development of the Grootegeluk Coal Mine. Work commenced in December 1974 on building the mine and one year later in December 1975, the actual quarrying of the mine commenced.

=== 1980s ===
Grootegeluk mine was officially opened on 15 April 1981. On 3 March 1982 this mine was in full operation for the first time.

Mokolo Dam (previously known as the Hans Strijdom Dam) was constructed in 1979-1980 on the Mokolo River, near Lephalale. The Malmanie River and the Bulspruit River, two tributaries of the Mokolo, also enter the dam from its left side. The dam mainly serves municipal and industrial purposes.

Since Iscor became part of Ellisras, Eskom also decided to extend its interest to Ellisras seeing that the steam coal produced is suitable for use in power stations and is used for the generation of steam. It happened by a decision by Eskom to build the air-cooled Matimba Power Station in close vicinity of the Iscor coal mine. Construction of the power station commenced in April 1981 and the first phase became operational shortly thereafter. Matimba was officially opened on 17 November 1989. Full municipal status was granted to Ellisras on 1 July 1986 by means of Administrator's notice 35 of 1986.

=== 1990s ===
The D'nyala Nature Reserve was the site for peace talks between Nobel Peace Prize winner F. W. de Klerk and Cyril Ramaphosa before the democratic transformation in South Africa. D'nyala is referred to as the original "bosberaad" (or bush conference) centre, based on the fact that it was used for hosting high level cabinet meetings of the former apartheid-government of South Africa prior to the first democratic elections of 1994. At the beginning of his presidency in 1989, former President F. W. de Klerk took his entire cabinet, plus a group of officials and advisors, to D'nyala for a two-day "bosberaad".

This conference involved discussions about policy development and strategies for change within the old South Africa. On 2 February 1990, a mere two months after this first bush conference, De Klerk announced the coming release of hundreds of political prisoners, including Nelson Mandela, and the legalization of black liberation organizations that had been outlawed for 30 years. He also proclaimed his then government's willingness to end apartheid and to negotiate a new constitution to the benefit of all South Africans.

Over the next four years De Klerk returned to the D'nyala seven more times with various officials in order to work out solutions for crises that arose during the negotiation processes. In December 1992 and January 1993, for example, government officials and members of the African National Congress (ANC) met at D'nyala for two more bush conferences. It was after these meetings that the government and the ANC began formally working on the new constitution that would lead to South Africa's first democratic elections in April 1994.

=== 2000s ===
The name of Ellisras town was changed to Lephalale during 2002.

== Town ==
The town is divided into three major extensions:

- Lephalale,
- Onverwacht and
- Marapong.

The Lephalale Municipality (LM) area comprises two (2) urban nodes, namely Lephalale/Onverwacht and Marapong (Provincial Growth Point), as well as the surrounding Witpoortjie/Thabo Mbeki rural area (Provincial Growth Point), that accommodates both commercial and communal mixed-farming practices.

An industrial area is also slowly developing near Onverwacht, while a heavy industrial zone has been earmarked near the Steenbokpan turnoff.

The locality of the municipal area in relation to the rest of the country ensures that a number of important regional routes transverse the area.

There is one National road running through the area and three main Provincial roads serve the area, namely:

- N11 (Mokopane/Baltimore/Botswana)
- P84/1 (Vaalwater/Ellisras/Botswana)
- P19/2 (Ellisras/Marken) that links with (Mokopane)
- P198/1 (Vaalwater/Ellisras)

These roads serve as links between Thabazimbi, Vaalwater, Ellisras and Mokopane. The P84/1 and 198/1 run mostly along the drainage subsystems in the area. These main roads are tarred and are in relatively good condition. The towns developed around the central business district in a linear form along the R517 road, and also along the main road that leads to Stockpoort.

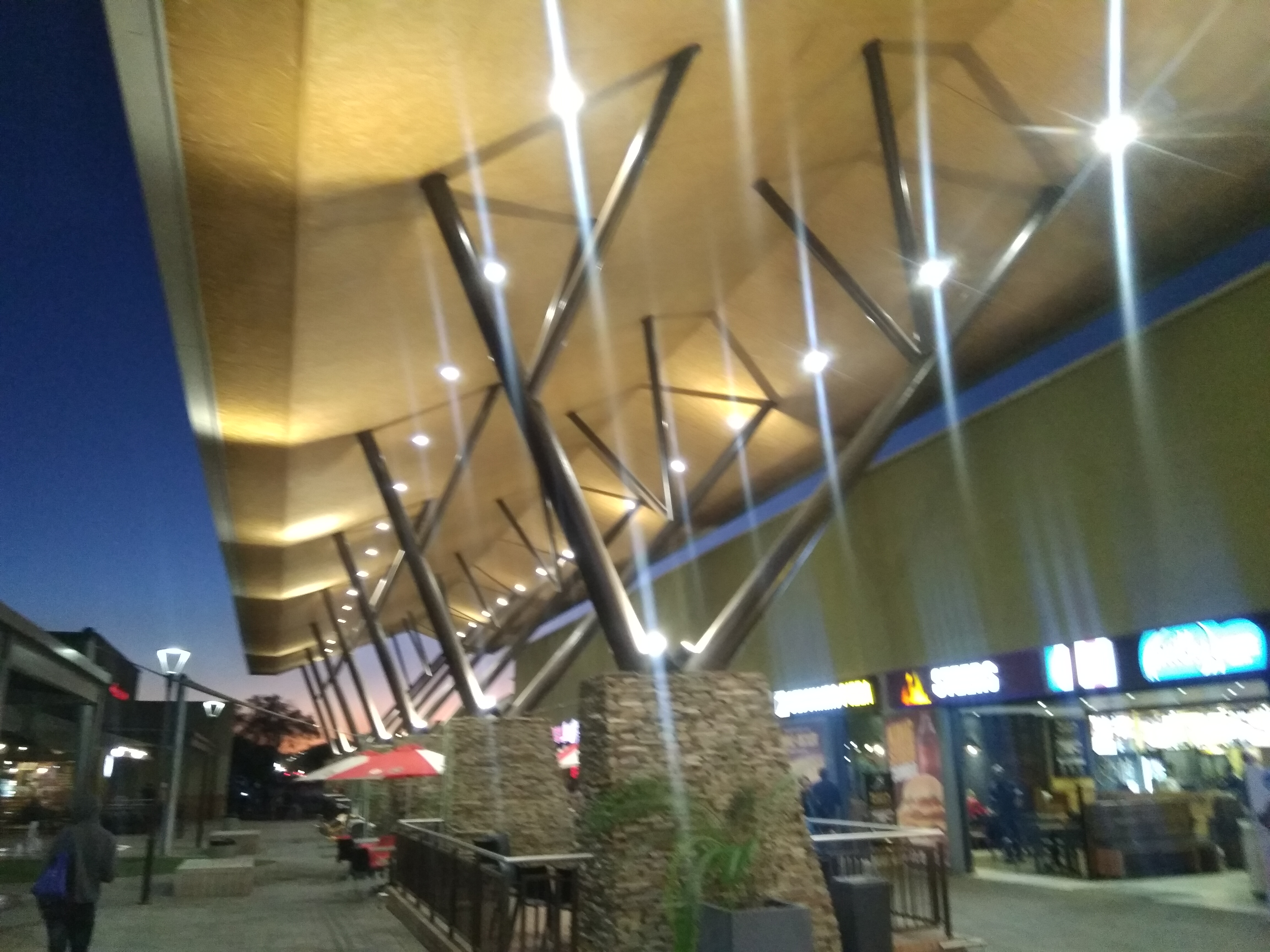
Lephalale Mall offers all modern shopping amenities

The Lephalale-Stockpoort road is the main connection road between the Marapong community and Lephalale/Onverwacht.

=== Notable people ===
- Hellen Motsuki, Skeem Saam actress, known as Melita Monama
- Lesiba Nku, footballer, plays as a midfielder for Stellenbosch FC
- Jan-Hendrik, actor and model
- Raymond Motadi, television host, YouTuber, radio broadcaster & LGBTQ+ activist who recently made a short film called Feminine Lotus
- Libbie Janse van Rensburg, South African rugby union and sevens player

== Geography ==
Lephalale is situated between 23°30' and 24°00' south latitude and 27°30' and 28°00' east longitude and the town is positioned west of the Mokolo river, a tributary to the Limpopo river, 820 meters above sea level.

== Weather ==
In Lephalale, the summers are long, hot, and partly cloudy and the winters are short, cool, dry, and clear. Over the course of the year, the temperature typically varies from 7 °C to 40 °C and is rarely below 4 °C or above 40 °C.

Based on the beach/pool score, the best times of year to visit Lephalale for hot-weather activities are from early February to mid April and from early September to early November.

== Economy ==
The economy of Lephalale is dominated by mining, electricity production, tourism, agriculture and game farming.

=== Mining ===
Lephalale is rich with coal which is mined by Exxaro at the Grootegeluk coal mine. The Waterberg coalfield has an estimated resource of 75-billion tons of coal, which is 40% of South Africa's remaining coal resource. The coalfield's 75-billion tons are in 11 zones, which consist of bright coal with interbedded shale and dull coal, sandstone and carbonaceous shale.

However, only a relatively small part of the Waterberg coalfield is shallow enough to be accessed by open pit mining. The Eenzaamheid fault and the Daarby fault divide the Waterberg coalfield into open pit mineable and underground mineable resources.

==== Grootegeluk ====
Grootegeluk is located in the narrow band between these faults. South of the Eenzaamheid fault and in between the Daarby fault and the Zoetfontien fault, in the north, coal is found from 250 m below surface and deeper. The Grootegeluk coal mine is the largest open cast coal mine together with beneficiation plants of its kind in the world. It produces more than 17 million tonnes of coal product per year and the mine provides iron and ore industries with high grade metallurgical coal for iron and steel production. The low grade coal is supplied to Eskom's Matimba Power Station.

Besides Exxaro, Anglo Coal, Sekoko Coal and Resgen mining houses also have operations in the Lephahale area.

=== Electricity production ===
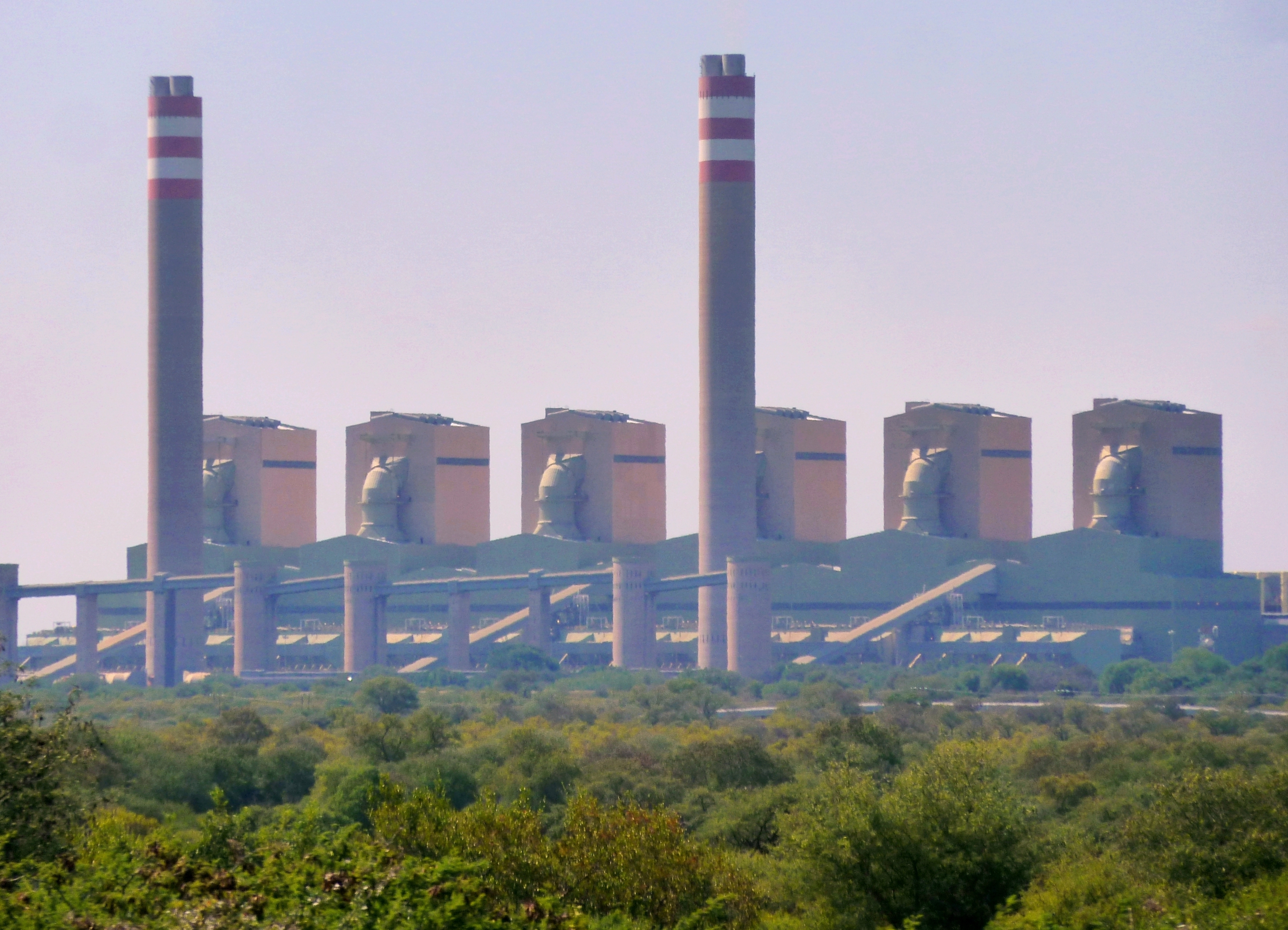

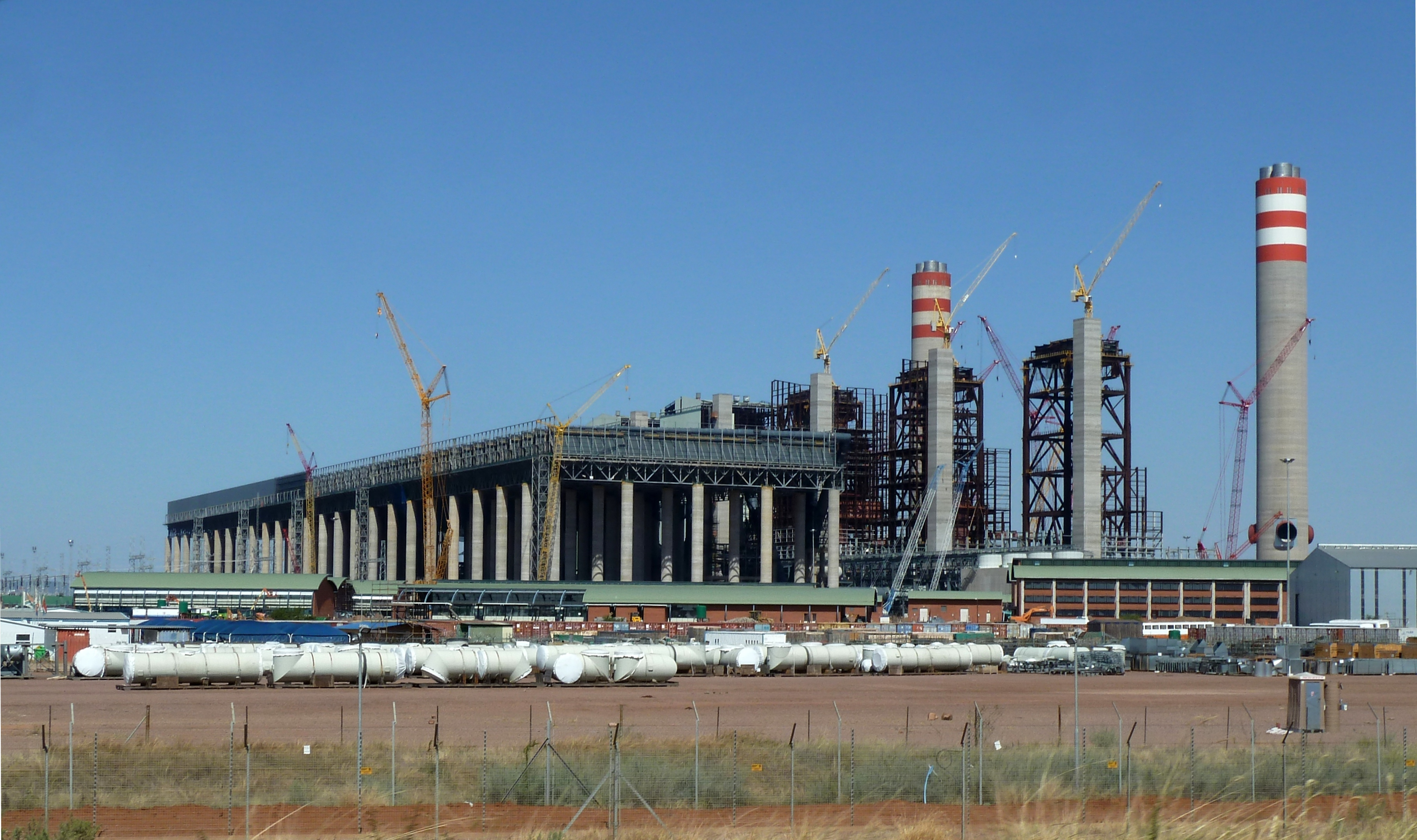
The coal for Matimba and Medupi power stations is extracted and processed by Grootegeluk mine.

Lephalale hosts two of South Africa's power stations:

- Eskom's Matimba Power Station. Matimba, the Tsonga word for power, is designed to generate 4,000 MW and is the largest direct dry-cooled power station in the world. Coal is supplied to Matimba by means of a conveyor belt system from Grootegeluk mine.
- Eskom is commissioning a new power station called Medupi. Medupi will have a capacity of 4,800 MW by the time its last unit is commissioned c. 2018.

=== Lephalale development projects ===
- Exxaro's Grootegeluk Medupi Expansion Project will, in terms of an agreement with the power utility, enable the Grootegeluk mine to supply the Medupi power station with an average 14,6Mtpa of power station coal over the next 40 years.
- Exxaro's Thabametsi, a third coal project for Exxaro in the Waterberg, with construction planned to reach its peak in 2021. The project will employ 1,500 people. Thabametsi translates into 'water mountain' and is situated about 13 km from Grootegeluk coal mine. When completed an average of 970 people will be employed at the mine which will have a life-span of some 30 years.
- Exxaro's proposed Independent Power Producer (IPP) Waterberg Power Station.
- The Mokolo and Crocodile Water Augmentation Project (MCWAP) entails the phased construction of two main bulk raw water transfer systems, as well as associated infrastructure to meet the new power station, mines, and domestic demands. The main components of the scheme are abstraction weirs, pump stations, pipelines and balancing storage. When completed in 2015, this project will ensure security of supply for both the surrounding communities and the power station and mines.
- Anglo Coal's Five Spot coal-bed methane pilot project and Thirty-Nine Spot project. The Thirty-Nine Spot project involves the drilling of another 39 boreholes and could culminate in a feasibility study in a couple of years.
- Sasol Mining's development of a surface mine named the Limpopo West Mine (LWM).
- Vedanta Resources PLC Independent Power Producer (IPP) Vedanta Power Station, close to Stockpoort.
- Resgens Boikarabelo Mine has probable reserves of 744.8-million tonnes of coal on 35% of the tenements under ResGen's control. The total resource across the whole Boikarabelo tenement could be 6-billion tonnes.

=== Agriculture and game farming ===
Agricultural and farming activities in Lephalale include:

==== Animal production ====
Cattle, goats and ostriches.

==== Plant production ====
Vegetables, cotton, tobacco, citrus, paprika, peppers, cucumbers, tomatoes, pumpkins, lucern, groundnuts, dry beans, wheat, maize, cut flowers and water melons. Lephalale is annually the first to produce water melons sold to the general market.

==== Game farming ====
Game (including rare species like roan, sable and buffalo) has in recent years become a major economic activity, whilst cattle farming is declining to make way for game farming.

== Transport ==
Public transport in Lephalale is provided by a number of taxi operators and two bus companies, Lowveld Bus Services and Phadziri Brothers. Lowveld Bus Services provides local and long distance services between Lephalale and surrounding villages. In addition it has a contract to provide services for the transportation of labourers to Grootegeluk and Matimba. Phadziri bus service also provides some services to Eskom.

== Industry ==
The major economic activities of around town includes:

- Exxaro's Grootegeluk Coal Mine
- Eskom's Matimba coal power station
- Eskom's new Medupi power station
- Agriculture

== Bushveld Festival ==
The Bushveld Festival takes place in early July. The festival includes cattle shows, a game auction, horse jumping, dog shows, agricultural activities, a three-day 4x4 competition, a game farms expo, hunting opportunities, bird and tree identification competitions, traditional food, live music, a beer tent and huge camp fires.

== Nature ==
=== The Mokolo River ===
This river and its tributaries rise in the western part of the Waterberg (between 1200 and 1600 metres above mean sea level). It originates in a flattish, open area with numerous koppies and flows through a steep gorge emerging above the town of Vaalwater. Here the river flows through a relatively flat area until it enters the Mokolo Dam.

From there, it flows through another gorge before entering the Limpopo Plain, near the junction with the Rietspruit. From this point, the Mokolo River flows through flat sandy areas until it reaches the Limpopo River. Fish species found in the Mokolo include:

- African mottled eel (Anguilla bengalensis labiata)
- Common mountain catfish (Amphilius uranoscopus)
- Shortspine suckermouth (Chiloglanis pretoriae)
- Small barbs (Barbus spp.)
- Largemouth bass (Micropterus salmoides)
- Smallmouth bass (Micropterus dolomieu)
- Shortfin barb (Enteromius brevipinnis)
- Orangefin barb (Enteromius eutaenia)
- Shortspine suckermouth (Chiloglanis pretoriae)
- Longfin eel (Anguilla mossambica)
- Redeye labeo (Labeo cylindricus) and
- Largescale yellowfish (Labeobarbus marequensis)

=== Vegetation ===
The area is dominated by mixed bushveld and sour bushveld (sourveld). In the Limpopo Plain, arid sweet bushveld occurs while pockets of north-eastern mountain sourveld occur in higher lying areas to the south of the catchment.

=== D'nyala Nature Reserve ===
Situated 10 km from the town of Lephalale, this resort gets its name from the massive nyala tree that is characteristic of the area, and is also the southernmost habitat of the famous baobab tree. D'nyala boasts a diversity of game which includes some 65 mammal species such as nyala, white rhinoceros, giraffe, waterbuck, tsessebe, oryx, eland, zebra, impala, caracal, African wildcat, brown hyena, black-backed jackal and leopard. The animals of D'nyala roam freely over the area including the vicinity of the chalets.

263 bird species have been identified including waterfowl attracted to the area by the plains, a few examples include tawny eagle, kori bustard, red-billed oxpecker, black stork, black-winged pratincole, white-backed vulture, Cape vulture, marabou stork, yellow-billed stork, martial eagle, secretarybird, bateleur, lappet-faced vulture, golden-breasted bunting, yellow-fronted canary, bushveld pipit, Cape longclaw, long-tailed paradise-whydah, violet-eared waxbill, African quailfinch, lesser masked-weaver, red-billed buffalo-weaver, capped wheatear, fiscal flycatcher, Chestnut-backed sparrow-lark, rufous-naped lark, arrow-marked babbler and orange-breasted bush-shrike.

In the centre of D'nyala, is a VIP mansion, and a conference centre that is of historical significance.

=== Mokolo Nature Reserve and Dam ===
Adjacent to the Mokolo Nature Reserve of 4,600 hectares is the Mokolo dam, the biggest dam in the Limpopo Province and bordering for 6 km on the Mokolo river, flows out of this dam. Approximately 50 km to the south of Lephalale, this dam is well suited for water sports enthusiasts, campers and day visitors. The dammed up Mokolo river winds around mountains. It is on the northern slopes of the Waterberg mountains and has the advantage of both sweet veld as well as sour veld. Mokolo Dam into which the Mokolo River flows, is fairly large and water enthusiasts, campers, anglers and birders all regard the reserve as a sanctuary, set as it is against the mountains. Mokolo Nature Reserve offers open savannah and dense bushveld to the animals that roam there.

=== Waterberg Biosphere Reserve ===
An area of the District Municipality was designated as a Waterberg Biosphere Reserve (Waterberg District Municipality, 2010). The biosphere reserve concept is aimed at achieving a balance between the pressures of the tourism industry, the need to generate direct benefits to local communities and conservation of the cultural and natural heritage assets.

The Waterberg Biosphere Reserve was declared a National Priority Area in terms of Section 18(1) of the National Environmental Management: Air Quality Act, 2004 (Act No. 39 of 2004). The area requires specific air quality management actions to address the negative impacts of the air quality as a proactive approach to support future sustainable development in the area (Waterberg District Municipality, 2010).

=== Wonderkop Nature Reserve ===
This reserve covers ±16,100 hectares and also adjoins the Glen Alpine Dam, which forms 11 km of the eastern boundary of Wonderkop Nature Reserve. It was proclaimed as a provincial nature reserve in June 1994. Environmental education is conducted in the areas adjacent to the reserve and the sustainable utilisation of natural resources is promoted from which the surrounding communities could benefit.

=== Lephalale's baboon spiders ===
A road upgrade project revealed in March 2012, that a large community of baboon spiders existed in the area. As these long lived species, golden-brown and burst-horned baboon spiders are protected under the National Environmental Management: Biodiversity Act, 175 individuals along the Nelson Mandela Road and another 376 along the Kuipersbult Road, were captured.

An 800 ha portion in the south of the Manketti Game Reserve, some 5–10 km from the capture site, was identified as a suitable new habitat. Artificial burrows were created and the spiders were relocated. This project is considered unique as the large scale relocation of invertebrates is a rare occurrence.
