= Maitland Mines =

Disused lead mines near Port Elizabeth, South Africa

Coordinates: 33°57′43″S 25°17′06″E

The Maitland Mines are several disused lead mines located on the Maitland River near Port Elizabeth in South Africa. Geologically the mine is located in Paleozoic sedimentary rocks of the Karoo Supergroup.

There are records of ore analyses from these deposits dating back to 1782 or 1792. Henry Lichtenstein visited the site in 1805 and they were again explored during the office of Governor Janssens. In 1856 A. Wyley reported 'a considerable amount of underground exploration without any apparent measure of success'. Nonetheless the deposits were again examined between 1924 and 1931. These revealed small veins and deposits of ore, with no lode or body of ore promising commercial success. The dolomitic limestone carrying the ore is in the shape of a simple syncline, both legs dipping towards the Maitland River. The trough of this syncline was regarded as the most promising site, but after much drilling did not fulfil expectations. The ore consists of argentiferous galena, chalcopyrite and chalcocite with malachite and azurite, in irregular stringers and elongate nodules, indicating development of minerals along crush zones.

During the era of muzzle-loaders lead was processed in the Transvaal, the lead coming mostly from near Argent, where a smelter was constructed between 1889 and 1893. These deposits were mined until 1957, when operations ceased. The production of lead was negligible until 1980, when the Black Mountain Mineral Development Company near Aggeneys commenced mining and South Africa became a net exporter. Other deposits were mined in the Marico district, at Edendale near Pretoria, and at the Balloch Mine at Niekerkshoop in the Cape Province, and a zinc-lead mine at Pering, 75 km from Vryburg.
