= Tamboti mine =

Platinum mine in North West, South Africa

- Location: North West, South Africa
- Products: platinum

The Tamboti mine is a large open pit mine located in the north-western part of South Africa in North West. Tamboti represents one of the largest platinum reserves in South Africa having estimated reserves of 27.1 million oz of platinum. The mine produces around 500,000 oz of platinum/year.
