= Thembelani mine =

Platinum mine in Rustenburg, North West, South Africa

- Location: Rustenburg, North West, South Africa
- Products: platinum, palladium, rhodium, ruthenium, gold
- Company: Anglo American Platinum

The Thembelani mine is a large open pit mine located in the north-western part of South Africa in Rustenburg, North West. Thembelani represents one of the largest platinum reserves in South Africa having estimated reserves of 15.6 million oz of platinum. The mine produces around 100,000 oz of platinum/year.
