= Burnstone mine =

South African gold mine

Location
- Location: Gauteng, South Africa

Production
- Products: Gold

The Burnstone mine is one of the largest gold mines in the South Africa and in the world. The mine is located in the north-east of the country in Gauteng. The mine has estimated reserves of 29.1 million oz of gold.
