= Afplats mine =

Platinum mine in North West, South Africa

- Location within South Africa

Location
- Location: North West, South Africa; 25°37′23″S 27°36′24″E

Production
- Products: platinum

The Afplats mine is a large open pit mine, located in the north-western part of South Africa in North West. Afplats represents one of the largest platinum reserves in South Africa having estimated reserves of 19.6 million oz of platinum. The mine produces around 200,000 oz of platinum/year.
