= Dwarsrivier mine =

Chromium mine in South Africa

- Location within South Africa
- Location: Dwarsrivier, Limpopo, South Africa; 24°56′12.84″S 30°7′39.36″E
- Products: Chromium
- Company: Assore

The Dwarsrivier mine is a large mine in the north-east of South Africa near Dwarsrivier in Limpopo. Dwarsrivier represents one of the largest chromium reserve in South Africa having estimated reserves of 55 million tonnes of ore grading 38.12% chromium. The 55 million tonnes of ore contains 21 million tonnes of chromium metal.
