= Buffelsfontein uranium mine =

Uranium mine in South Africa

Buffelsfontein mine
- Location within South Africa

Location
- Location: Gauteng, South Africa; 26°51′51.98″S 26°44′34.01″E

Production
- Products: uranium

The Buffelsfontein mine is a large mine located in the northern part of South Africa in Gauteng. Buffelsfontein represents one of the largest uranium reserves in South Africa having estimated reserves of 59.3 million tonnes of ore grading 0.016% uranium.
