= Pandora mine =

Open pit mine in Rustenburg, South Africa

- Location: Rustenburg, North West, South Africa
- Products: platinum, palladium, rhodium, ruthenium, gold
- Company: Anglo American Platinum

The Pandora mine is a large open pit mine located in the north-eastern part of South Africa in Rustenburg, North West. Pandora represents one of the largest platinum reserves in South Africa having estimated reserves of 28.4 million oz of platinum. The mine produces around 39,000 oz of platinum/year.
