= Tumela mine =

Platinum mine in Limpopo, South Africa

- Location: Thabazimbi, Limpopo, South Africa
- Products: platinum, palladium, rhodium, ruthenium, gold
- Company: Anglo American Platinum

The Tumela mine is a large underground and open cast mine located in the north-western part of South Africa in Thabazimbi, Limpopo. Tumela represents one of the largest platinum reserves in South Africa having estimated reserves of 56.5 million oz of platinum. The mine produces around 280,000 oz of platinum/year.
