= Kumba Iron Ore =

Mining company in South Africa

- Type: Public
- Traded as: JSE: KIO
- Industry: Mining
- Headquarters: Centurion, Gauteng (City of Tshwane Metropolitan Municipality), South Africa
- Key people: Mpumi Zikalala (CEO), Bothwell Mazarura (CFO), Vijay Kumar (COO)
- Products: Iron ore
- Revenue: R 80.1 billion (2020)
- Net income: R 20.7 billion (2020)
- Number of employees: 14,040 (2014)
- Parent: Anglo American plc
- Website: angloamericankumba.com

Kumba Iron Ore is an iron-ore mining company in South Africa. It is the fifth largest iron-ore producer in the world and the largest in Africa.

== History ==
Kumba Iron Ore is a successor of Kumba Resources, which was listed on the Johannesburg Securities Exchange in 2001. Kumba Resources was reorganized in November 2006 when heavy minerals operations were spun off to the newly created company Kumba Iron Ore and coal to Exxaro Resources.

Kumba Iron Ore Ltd. listed on the JSE in November 2006 with a market capitalization of R36 billion.

== Operations ==
Kumba Iron Ore owns 74% in Sishen Iron Ore Company (SIOC). Rest of SIOC is owned by Exxaro, SIOC Employee Share Participation Scheme and the SIOC Community Development Trust. Through the SIOC, Kumba Iron Ore owns Thabazimbi, Sishen and Kolomela iron ore mines.

In 2010, Kumba Iron Ore was one of the more successful divisions of Anglo American plc, continuing to pay dividends to shareholders while Anglo American and Anglo Platinum had suspended dividends in 2008.

=== Mining Operations ===
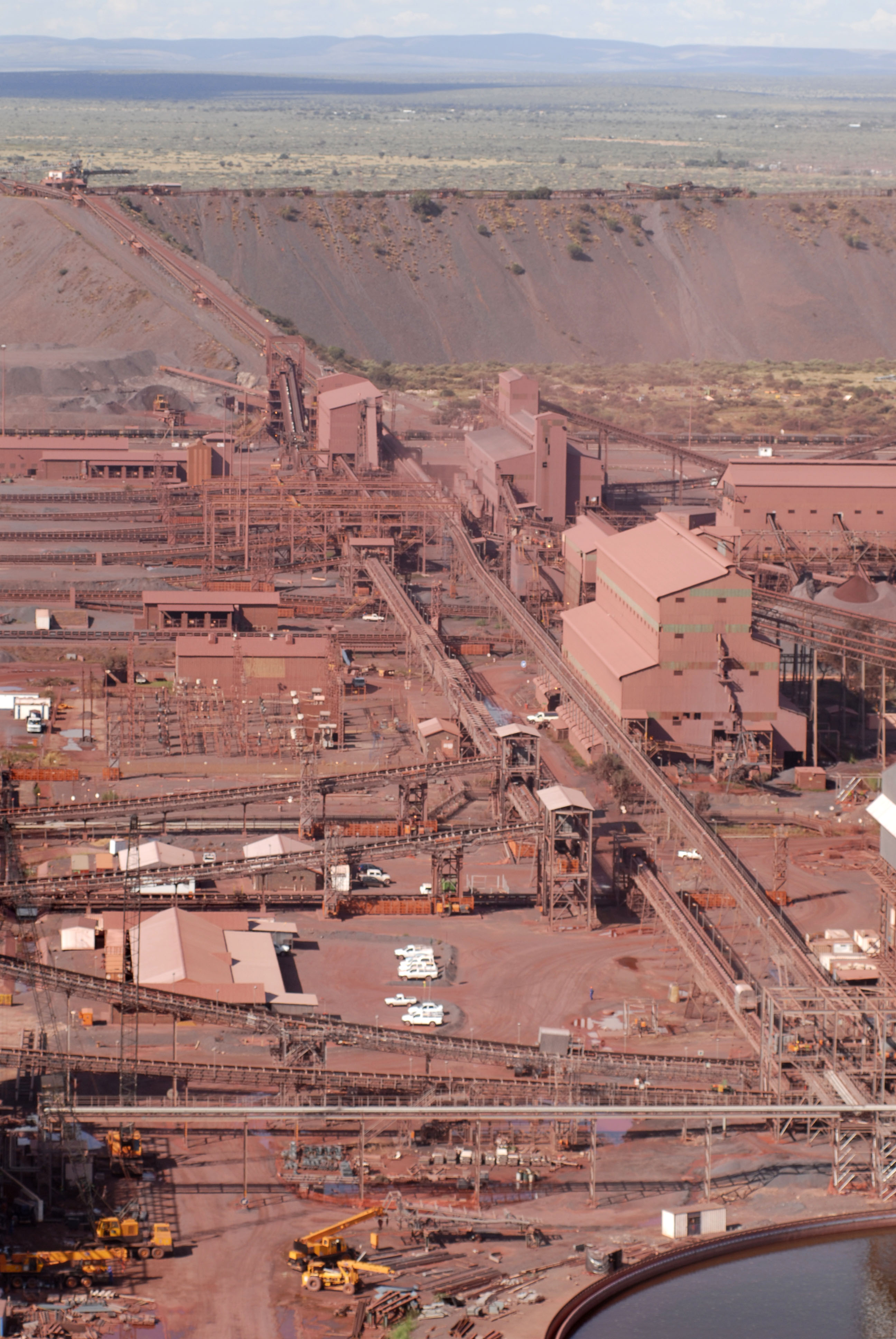
Sishen Mine

Sishen Mine is situated in Kathu in the Northern Cape Province. It is one of the largest open pit mines in the world. Kumba Iron Ore has reported that Sishen Mine has reserves for a 19-year life of mine. Mining methods at Sishen are opencast mining. Ore is transported to the beneficiation and jig plant. The Sishen mine jig plant is the largest of its kind in the world.

By July 2016, production had been halved and workforce cut by 31%, in response to the slump in global iron ore prices.

=== Thabazimbi mine ===
Located close to Thabazimbi in the Limpopo Province, mining operations started in 1931. Mining is by opencast methods. In a deal brokered in 2013, the high-grade hematite ore produced at Thabazimbi mine would be sold only to ArcelorMittal SA, while Kumba Iron Ore managed operations. However, in February 2015, Kumba announced that the Thabazimbi mine was no longer economically viable.

=== Kolomela mine ===
Kolomela mine is located at Postmasburg in the Northern Cape Province. Mining operations started in 2011, and the company has reported a 25-year mine lifespan. 2019 iron ore production: 13.2 MT.

=== Controversy ===
In 2010, Kumba Iron Ore started legal proceedings against Imperial Crown Trading 289 and the Ministry of Mines for the issuance of a mining licence after ArcelorMittal SA did not complete paperwork by the due date and failed to convert their 21.4% undivided share. This led to the assets reverting to the State, which then awarded the licence to a previously unknown company, Imperial Crown Trading 289.

== Ownership ==
Shareholders of Kumba Iron Ore are:

- Anglo American plc (63.4%)
- Industrial Development Corporation of South Africa Ltd (13.1%)
- Minority shareholders (23.5%)

== Carbon footprint ==
Kumba Iron Ore reported Total CO2e emissions (Direct + Indirect) for the twelve months ending 31 December 2020 at 910 Kt (-90 /-9% y-o-y).

Kumba Iron Ore's annual Total CO2e emissions (Direct + Indirect) (in kilotonnes)
Dec 2018	Dec 2019	Dec 2020
960	1,000	910
