= Medupi Power Station =

Power station in Limpopo, South Africa

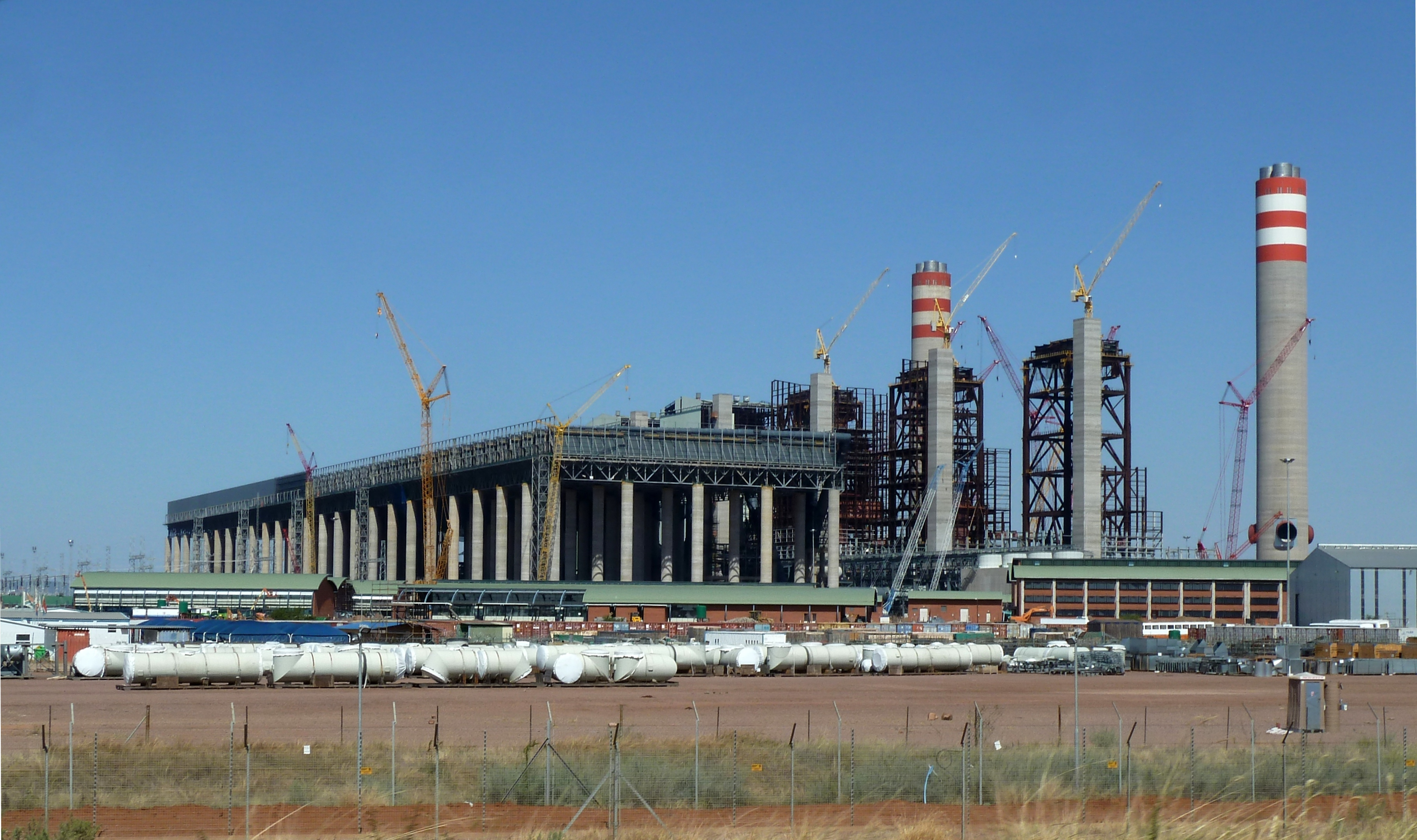
- Country: South Africa
- Location: Lephalale
- Coordinates: 23°42′00″S 27°33′00″E
- Status: Under construction
- Construction began: 2007
- Commission date: 23 August 2015
- Owner: Eskom

Thermal power station
- Primary fuel: Coal

Power generation
- Units operational: 6 x 794
- Nameplate capacity: 4,764 MW
- Capacity factor: 70%

External links
- Commons: Related media on Commons

Medupi Power Station is a dry-cooled coal-fired power station built by Eskom near Lephalale in Limpopo province, South Africa. The station consists of 6 generating units with a nameplate capacity of 794 MW each, bringing the total installed capacity of 4,764 MW.

== Original concept ==
Medupi was conceived as Project Alpha in 2007, with only three units planned to total 2,292 MW - 2382 MW and estimated cost of R32 billion. The design was changed at a late stage in 2007 and doubled in size to 4,764 MW.

The boilers were envisaged to be supercritical in type, which would make them 38% more effective than other Eskom power stations. A dry-cooled system was also intended to use less water than other coal-fired power stations in the fleet.

Initially, the project was expected to cost R69 billion, but that was updated to approximately R80 billion by 2007.

Parsons Brinckerhoff was appointed as the project engineer to oversee all construction.

== Power output ==
=== Design ===
The power station has six boilers, each powering 794 MW turbines, producing 4,764 MW in total. When completed, Medupi became the largest dry-cooled coal-fired power station in the world.

=== Awards ===
Medupi's GE Steam Power Systems was awarded a Global Project Excellence Gold Award at the 2016 IPMA Project Excellence Awards.

=== Main equipment suppliers ===
Alstom provided the steam turbines, whilst Hitachi provided the super critical boilers.

=== Coal supply ===
Medupi is supplied with coal from Exxaro's Grootegeluk coal mine, located north of the site. Eskom placed a contract with Exxaro to supply 14.6 MT of coal per year for 40 years.

== Power generation ==
=== Construction timeline ===
Completion of the first two units was expected by 2012, but various delays impacted progress. The first 794 MW unit (number 6) was commissioned and handed over to Eskom Generation on 23 August 2015. Units 5 to 1 was completed at approximately nine-month intervals thereafter.

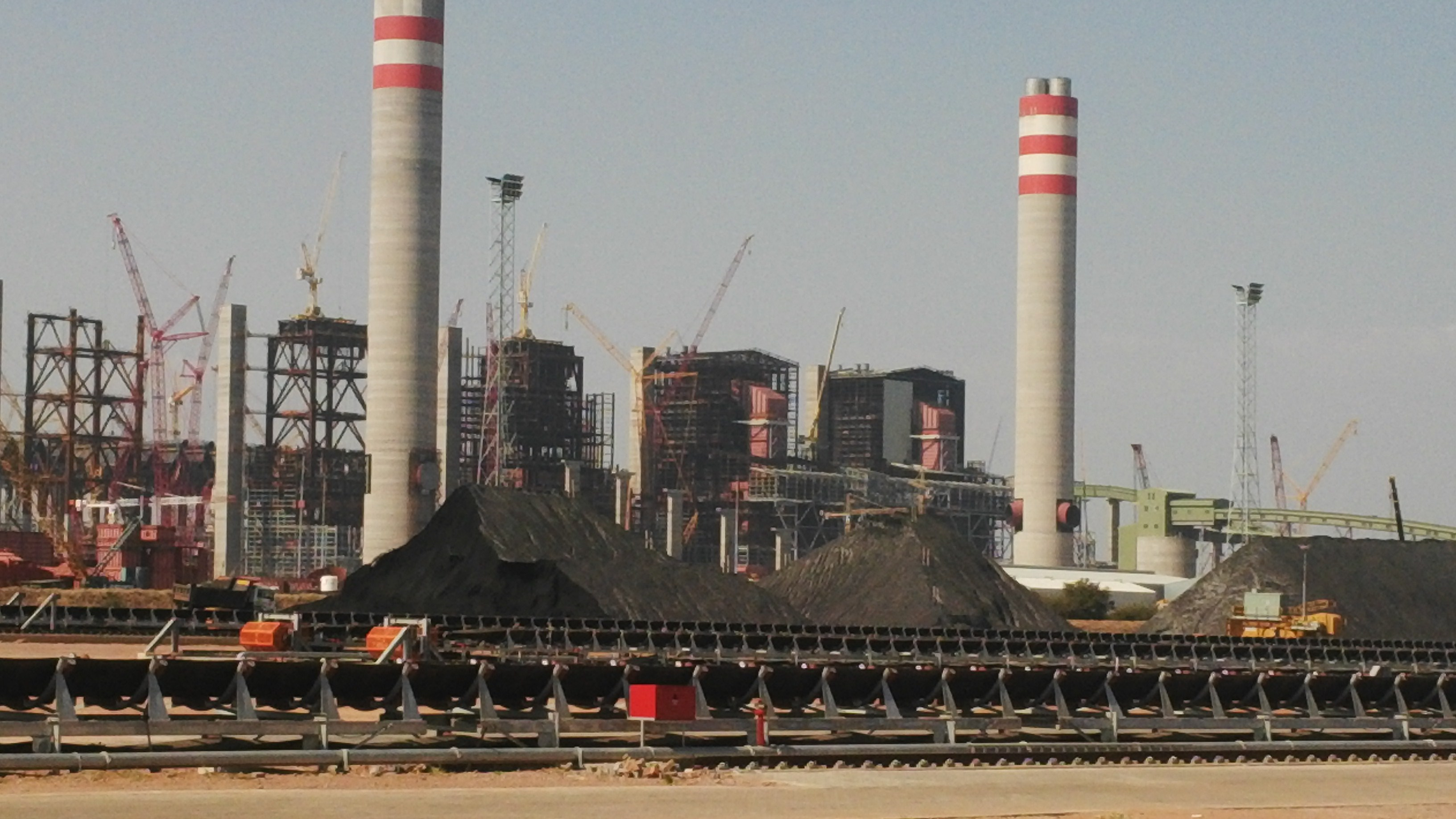
Development of the coal yard, early 2014

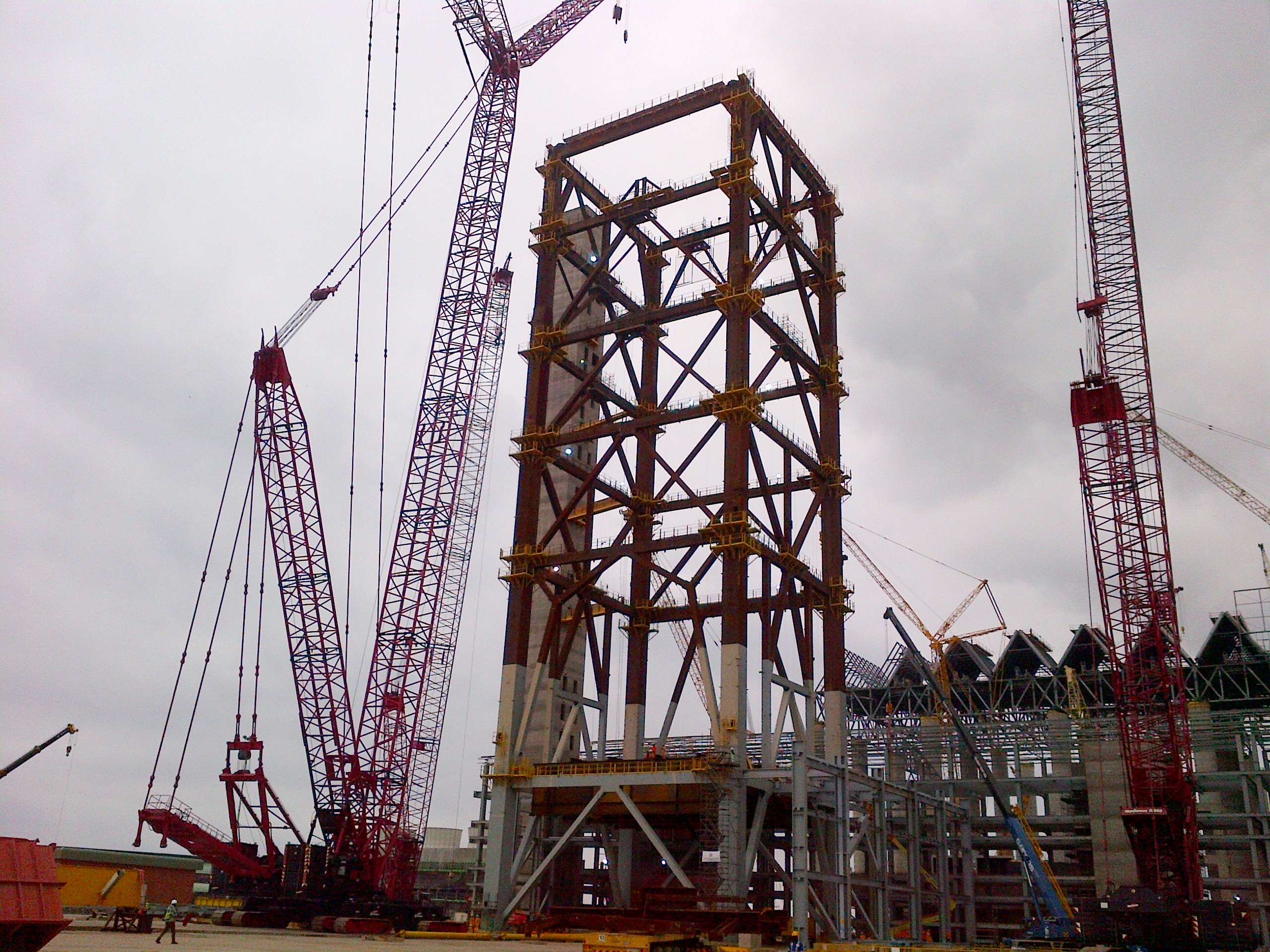
Fabrication of a boiler structure, mid 2014

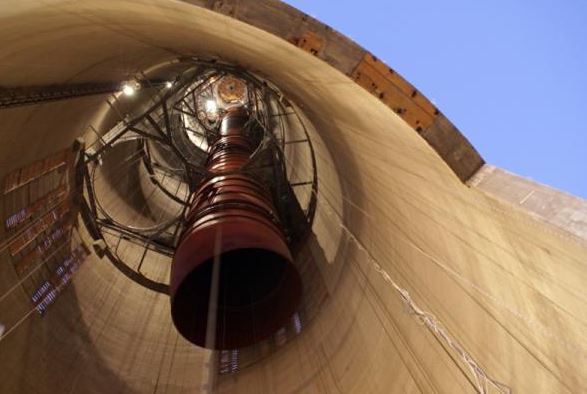
Fabrication of thermal chimney, mid 2011

- 18 July 2008: first structural concrete poured.
- 21 November 2008: first three air-cooled condenser columns completed.
- August 2009: Unit 6 boiler lift shaft completed.
- 9 February 2010: first structural steel erected at Unit 6 boiler.
- 12 August 2010: Chimney South concrete slide completed to a height of 220m.
- November 2010: Chimney North concrete slide completed to a height of 220m.
- May 2011: Chimney South first flue cans lined with borosilicate glass installed.
- October 2011: upgrade of D1675 access road completed.
- 8 September 2011: 10000-ton coal silo completed.
- 21 November 2011: auxiliary boiler completed.
- 10 February 2012: direct-current supplies energised.
- 27 November 2012: first 24-hour performance test of 5.4 km overland coal conveyor.
- September 2013: Unit 4 generator motor threaded into stator.
- September 2013: wet run of submerged scraper conveyor conducted, readying boilers for first fire.
- November 2014: overland ash conveyor commissioned.
- 18 February 2015: then Public Enterprises Minister Lynne Brown announced that the number 6 turbine was running at optimal speed of 3000 revolutions per minute.
- 22 February 2016: number 5 turbine undergoes load testing. Commercial operation began on 3 April 2017.
- 2016: Primary coal stockyard and conveyor commissioned.
- December 2016: Ngwedi substation transformer commissioned (part of Medupi Power Station Integration Project).
- 28 November 2017: Unit 4 was commissioned.
- 6 June 2018: announced that Unit 3 had entered commercial operation.
- 9 October 2018: announced that Unit 2 had been synchronised. By November 2019, this unit had reached full commercial operation.
- 27 August 2019: final unit achieved synchronisation.
- Peripheral works such as overflow coal yards has an expected completion date of 2021.
- October 2020: No-obligation request for information bid issued to gain insight into flue gas desulphurisation (FGD) technologies currently available and to assess their potential suitability for deployment.
- 31 July 2021: Eskom announced that the plant had achieved commercial operation status.

=== Related projects ===
==== Bulk water ====
In order to meet the growing demand for power generation and mining activities in the Lephalale area, two main bulk raw water transfer systems were also required. This comprised a 4.5 MW pump station and 46 km pipeline extracting from the Mokolo Dam. Phase 1 of this project was commissioned in 2015.

==== Transmission connection ====
174 kilometres of high-voltage transmission lines were required from Medupi to the Borutho substation near Mokopane. Construction occurred between November 2015 and the end of 2017.

=== Delays and defects ===
The dates for full commercial operation were shifted numerous times, mostly due to labour disputes such as:

- In September 2012, workers were sent home after vehicles and equipment were damaged.
- In July 2013, a group of about 1000 workers turned violent damaging vehicles.
- In July 2014, the National Union of Metal Workers halted work for weeks.
- In March 2015, an eight-week illegal strike escalated into violence, damage and intimidation. Delays were also due to technical issues such as steam piping pressure, weld rechecks on the boilers, ash system blockage, and damages to mill crushers.

==== Unit 4 generator explosion ====
On 9 August 2021, in the second week after Eskom announced that Medupi had attained commercial operation, Medupi Unit 4 was extensively damaged in a hydrogen explosion that caused a loss of 700 MW in generating capacity. The cost of repair was estimated at up to R2 billion, or up to R40 billion.

== Cost escalation ==
The initial expected cost of R80 billion (2007 Rands), was revised to R154 billion (2013 Rands). By 2019, the cost of Medupi was independently estimated at R234 billion (2019 Rands). Some of the primary reasons for the cost escalation was the importing of components affected by a fluctuating Rand exchange rate, redesigns and rework, and labour disputes and standing time. Due to cost escalations, the African Development Bank has stated that they do not expect the power plant to produce a positive financial return over the course of its lifetime.

== Critics ==
The building of this power station attracted various criticisms.

=== Interference ===
Critics alleged that the government endorsed the project due to the ruling party, the African National Congress, holding a 25% share of a package and stood to make a profit of close to 1 billion Rand.

=== Coal ===
Backers of the project argued that new-generation coal plants were needed. Other critics argued that effective management of coal supplies was needed to existing stations.

=== Cost ===
The African Development Bank lent $500 million for the project in 2008.

In 2010, the World Bank agreed to lend South Africa $3.75 billion to assist with several energy projects, with $3.05 billion allocated for completion.

=== Emissions ===
The approval of the World Bank loan drew criticism for supporting increased global emissions of greenhouse gases.

=== Inquiry ===
By 2018, the government's Public Enterprises Minister Pravin Gordhan announced a forensic probe into the delays and cost overruns on the completion of Kusile and Medupi Power Stations.

== National grid context ==
The Medupi and Kusile power stations were constructed to increase the electricity generation capacity of South Africa. Insufficient electricity generation had resulted in the ongoing South African energy crisis starting in 2007. This has resulted in years of rolling blackouts.

As of 11 February 2019, Eskom reinstated load-shedding due to ongoing strain on the national grid from failing older power stations. The blackouts were as severe as those of 2015, removing up to 4,000 MW of demand from the national grid, and negatively impacted the economy. In December 2019, unusually heavy flooding and rain triggered failures at the Medupi plant and forced Eskom to cut 6,000 MW from the national power grid, the biggest power cuts in South Africa in a decade.

== See also ==
- List of coal power stations
- List of largest power stations in the world
- List of power stations in South Africa
- Kusile Power Station
