= Siphumelele mine =

Platinum mine in Rustenburg, North West, South Africa

- Interactive map of Siphumelele mine
- Location: Rustenburg, North West, South Africa; 25°39′46″S 27°22′36″E
- Products: platinum, palladium, rhodium, ruthenium, gold
- Company: Anglo American Platinum

The Siphumelele mine is one of the largest platinum mines located in the north-western part of South Africa in Rustenburg, North West. The mine is owned and operated by Anglo American Platinum. Siphumelele represents one of the largest platinum reserves in South Africa having estimated reserves of 12.4 million oz of platinum. The mine produces around 100,000 oz of platinum/year.

== Methods ==
The mining method used is breast stoping with strike pillars. The layout consists of a single vertical shaft. The ore mined is then processed using gravity separation and flotation.
