= Goedgevonden mine =

Coal mine in Mpumalanga, South Africa

Goedgevonden Coal Mine
- Location within Mpumalanga Location within South Africa Location within Africa
- Location: South Africa, Mpumalanga; 26.10241°S 29.08010°E
- Products: Coking coal
- Company: African Rainbow Minerals

The Goedgevonden Coal Mine is a coal mine located in Mpumalanga Province, South Africa. The mine has coal reserves amounting to 200 million tonnes of coking coal, one of the largest coal reserves in Africa and the world. The mine has an annual production capacity of 6.7 million tonnes of coal.
