= Khuseleka mine =

Platinum mine in Rustenburg, North West, South Africa

- Location within South Africa
- Location: Rustenburg, North West, South Africa; 25°0′0″S 27°0′0″E
- Products: platinum, palladium, rhodium, ruthenium, gold
- Company: Anglo American Platinum

The Khuseleka mine is a large underground mine located in the north-western part of South Africa in Rustenburg, North West. Khuseleka represents one of the largest platinum reserves in South Africa having estimated reserves of 10.2 million oz of platinum. The mine produces around 130,000 oz of platinum/year.
