= Bathopele mine =

Platinum mine in Rustenburg, North West, South Africa

- Location within South Africa

Location
- Location: Rustenburg, North West, South Africa; 25°41′15″S 27°18′22″E

Production
- Products: platinum, palladium, rhodium, ruthenium, gold

Owner
- Company: Sibanye Stillwater

The Bathopele mine is a mechanised mine located in the north-western part of South Africa in Rustenburg, North West. Bathopele represents one of the largest platinum reserves in South Africa having estimated reserves of 5.3 million oz of platinum. The mine produces around 120,000 oz of platinum/year.
