= Springbok Flats mine =

Proposed uranium mine in Limpopo, South Africa

Coordinates: 24°57′S 28°32′E

- Interactive map of Springbok Flats mine
- Location: Springbok Flats, Limpopo, South Africa
- Products: uranium

The proposed Springbok Flats mine will be located near Settlers in southern Limpopo province, South Africa. The Springbok Flats resource represents one of the largest uranium reserves in South Africa having estimated reserves of 195 million tonnes of ore with a grading of 0.042% uranium.

Besides uranium, the resource area of some 57,000 ha contains significant deposits of coal and coking coal. The development of the uranium mine with a production capacity of 2 million lb per annum of U_{3}O_{8}, will also enable power generation of over 600 MW at an expected 32 c/kWh as a by-product from the process.
