= Inkosi mine =

Open pit platinum mine in South Africa

- Location: North West, South Africa
- Products: platinum

The Inkosi mine is a large open pit mine located in the north-western part of South Africa in North West. Inkosi represents one of the largest platinum reserves in South Africa having estimated reserves of 9.4 million oz of platinum. The mine produces around 300,000 oz of platinum/year.
