= Vele coal mine =

Coal mine in Limpopo, South Africa

Vele Coal Mine
- Interactive map of Vele Coal Mine
- Location: Limpopo, South Africa; 22°10′23″S 29°40′49″E
- Products: Coking coal
- Opened: 2009
- Closed: 2040 (projected)

The Vele Coal Mine is a coal mine located in Limpopo Province, South Africa. The majority of its shares are held by Coal Africa Limited (CoAL).

== Objections ==
There were several objections to mining at this location, which as of 2016, are not fully resolved. This included a land claim, and protests from environmental, cultural, political and youth groups. A main concern is its proximity to the Greater Mapungubwe Transfrontier Conservation Area, a World Heritage Site.

== Operation ==
The mine has coal reserves amounting to 721 million tonnes of coking coal, one of the largest coal reserves in Africa and the world. The mine produces around 14 million tonnes of coal per year. When fully operational three coal seams will be mined in opencast as well as underground operations.
