= Khomanani mine =

Platinum mine in North West, South Africa

Impala mine
- Location within South Africa
- Location: North West, South Africa; 25°32′28″S 27°11′5″E
- Products: platinum

The Impala mine is a large platinum mine located near Rustenburg in the North West Province of South Africa. Impala represents one of the largest platinum reserves in South Africa having estimated reserves of 68.9 million oz of platinum. The mine produces around 800,000 oz of platinum/year.
