= Beisa North mine =

Uranium mine in South Africa

- Location: Gauteng, South Africa
- Products: uranium

The Beisa North mine is a large mine located in the northern part of South Africa in Gauteng. Beisa North represents one of the largest uranium reserves in South Africa having estimated reserves of 27.9 million tonnes of ore grading 0.066% uranium.
