= Black Rock mine =

Manganese mine in Northern Cape, South Africa

Coordinates: 27°07′59.9″S 22°49′59.9″E

- Interactive map of Black Rock mine

Location
- Location: South Africa

Production
- Products: Manganese

The Black Rock mine is a mine located at Hotazel (John Taolo Gaetsewe District Municipality) in the Northern Cape province of South Africa. Black Rock represents one of the largest manganese reserves in South Africa having estimated reserves of 70.4 million tonnes of manganese ore grading 39% manganese metal.
