= Leeuwpan coal mine =

Coal mine in Mpumalanga, South Africa

Leeuwpan Coal Mine
- Location: Mpumalanga, South Africa
- Products: Coking coal

The Leeuwpan Coal Mine is a coal mine located in the Mpumalanga Province. The mine has coal reserves amounting to 160 million tonnes of coking coal, one of the largest coal reserves in Africa and the world. The mine produces around 3 million tonnes of coal per year.
