= Exxaro =

South African mining company

Exxaro Resources
- Type: Public
- Traded as: JSE: EXX
- Industry: Mining
- Founder: Unbundling of Kumba Resources, merged with Eyesizwe Coal and Namakwa Sands
- Headquarters: Centurion, Gauteng (City of Tshwane Metropolitan Municipality), South Africa
- Key people: Geoffrey Qhena (Chairman), Bennetor Magara (CEO), PA Koppeschaar (CFO)
- Products: Coal products and Energy
- Revenue: ▲ R 32 771 billion (2021)
- Operating income: ▲ R 7 460 billion (2021)
- Net income: ▲ R 16 373 billion (2021)
- Total assets: ▲ R 75 717 1 billion (2021)
- Total equity: ▲ R 50 098 billion (2021)
- Number of employees: 6,648 (2016)
- Website: exxaro.com

Exxaro Resources Limited (Exxaro, the company or the group) is a South African diversified resources company that primarily produces coal.

Exxaro is among the top five coal producers in South Africa.

The company is listed on the Johannesburg Stock Exchange and at 31 December 2021, had assets of R75.7 billion and a market capitalization of R53.4 billion.

== History ==
The company was formerly known as Kumba Resources Limited and changed its name to Exxaro Resources Limited in November 2006. Exxaro Resources Limited is a subsidiary of Main Street 333 Proprietary Limited.

Exxaro Resources announced in October 2012 plans for a "mine of the future" concept. The mine targets zero waste emissions, zero effluent, wash-to-zero and sustainable engineering.

In 2019, Exxaro moved to their new headquarters, in Centurion, Gauteng. The building was designed with a 5-star energy rating and is named the conneXXion (cXX).

In 2020, Exxaro was approved for a secondary listing on the A2X stock exchange.

== Operations ==
Exxaro as at 2025 has the following operating mines:

- Grootegeluk - thermal (domestic and export), metallurgical and semi soft coking coal
- Leeuwpan - thermal (domestic and export), metallurgical coal
- Belfast - thermal (domestic and export), metallurgical coal
- Matla - tied colliery (with Eskom) providing thermal coal
- Mafube - JV colliery with Thungela providing thermal (domestic and export), metallurgical coal

Exxaro as at 2025 has the following equity investments:

- Kumba Iron Ore - 26% equity in Sishen Iron Ore Company (SIOC)
- Black Mountain - 25% equity in Black Mountain Lead Zinc Mine (Vedenta)

Exxaro also owns Cennergi - its own renewable company. Exxaro Cennergi's primary assets are its renewable energy facilities, which include operational wind farms in the Eastern Cape (Tsitsikamma and Amakhala Emoyeni), a solar power project (LSP) under development, and a new wind farm (Karreebosch) also under construction, supported by partnerships and project financing. Cennergi also offers asset management services for renewable energy projects.
