= Gold mining in Ghana =

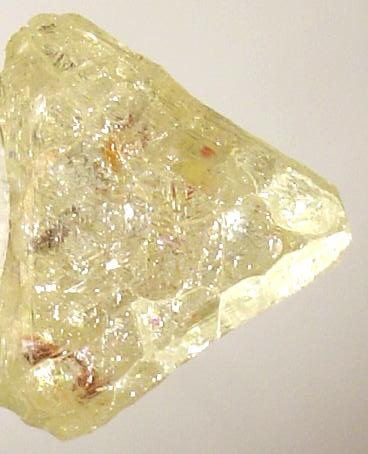
A large, sharp, equant, translucent, yellow, spinel-twinned or macle twinned Diamond (Super macle twinned Diamond)from Akwatia Diamond Mine and Birim Diamond Field at Akwatia in the Eastern Region; and a couple of inclusions add character to this thick, lustrous crystal.

Commercial gold mining began in what is today Ghana in the early 19th century, with Europeans later establishing several mines during the colonial period. The first documented large-scale mining operation in Ghana was at Obuasi, where gold was discovered in 1897. By 1900, Ghana, then known as the Gold Coast, had become a major supplier of gold in the British Empire.

Ghana is renowned for its gold resources and is the largest producer of gold in Africa as of 2019. Major gold discoveries and mining activities have centered around the Ashanti Region and other areas such as Tarkwa, Akyem, and Prestea, forming part of the extensive Birimian and Tarkwaian gold belts.

== Geographical context ==
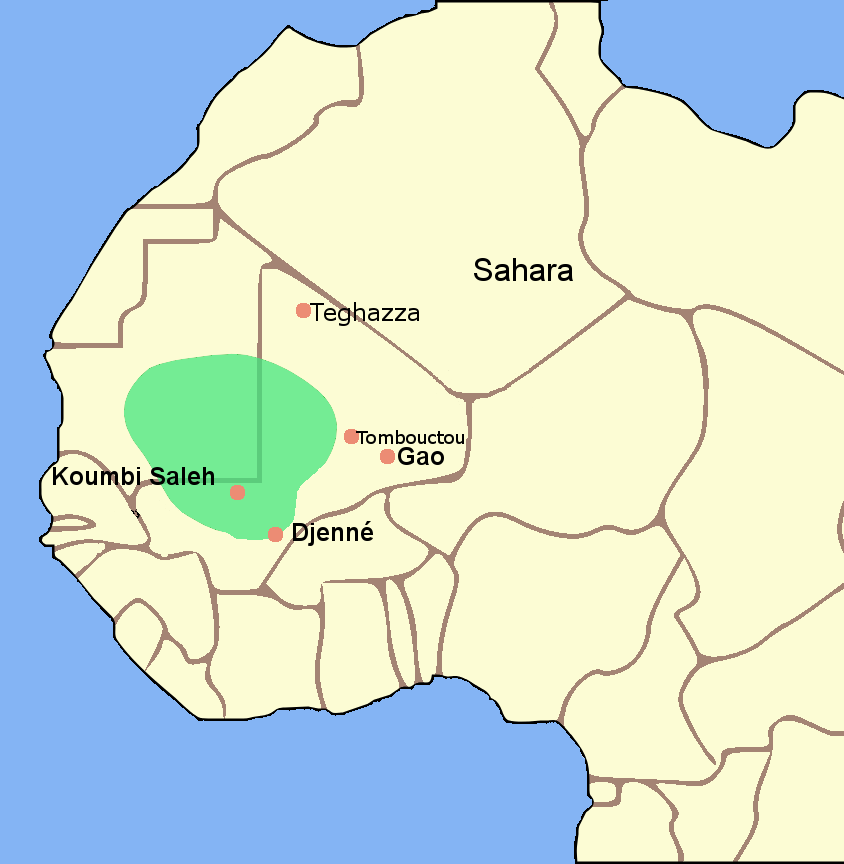
Map of Ghana Empire

A common misconception in researching gold mining in Ghana is confusing the modern state of Ghana with the ancient Ghana Empire, which are different geographical areas. The Ghana Empire was located in what is currently Mali and Mauritania and was landlocked, whereas the modern state of Ghana is located on the "Gold Coast" of Africa.

=== The Ancient Ghana Empire ===
The Ghana Empire was the first major empire of West Africa, existing between the seventh and thirteenth centuries. The majority of those living in the empire at the time were known as the Soninke, cultural representations of these people today are described to be dressed in colorful robes as well as donning various gold jewelry.

== Early gold mining ==
Ashanti Region has played a central role in gold mining in Ghana, dating back to the 19th century. Local artisanal mining, known as galamsey, predated industrial efforts. The Ashanti Goldfields Corporation was established in 1897, marking the start of large-scale industrial gold mining in Ghana.

== Modern gold production ==
Large-scale gold mining in Ghana took off in the mid-20th century, with operations expanding in the 1980s due to rising gold prices. Companies such as AngloGold Ashanti and Newmont have operated extensive mines, contributing to Ghana's economy.

In 2019, Ghana overtook South Africa as the leading gold producer in Africa, producing 142.4 tonnes of gold, representing 4.1% of global production. The sector accounts for over 90% of the country's mineral exports and remains an important part of Ghana's economy. In 2020, government licensed artisan and small-scale operations accounted for about 35% of total gold production, and in 2023 gold became nearly half of all exports from Ghana, which supported the livelihood of more than 10% of Ghana's total population, about 5 million people. However, illegal small scale gold mining, known as Galamsey, has undermined the economic strives Ghana has made in recent years, and an estimated $2.3 billion will be lost each year to smuggled gold and lost revenue.

== Gold mining by region in Ghana ==
=== Ashanti Region ===
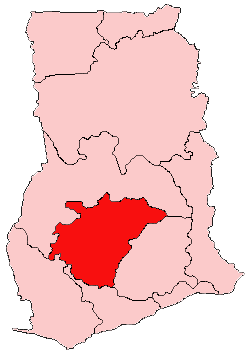
Ashanti Region in Ghana

The Ashanti Region is historically and currently one of the major gold-producing areas in Ghana. The region is home to some of the largest gold mining companies in the country, including AngloGold Ashanti at Obuasi. Obuasi produced more than 35 million ounces of gold since its discovery in the late 19th century Additionally, the Ahafo South and Ahafo North in the Ashanti Region, home to Newmont Ghana's Ahafo mine, is also a contributor to Ghana's gold output.

=== Western Region ===
The Western Region, particularly the Tarkwa and Prestea districts, is another gold-producing area. Tarkwa, known for its large-scale open-pit mining, has been in operation for several decades and is one of Ghana's gold producers. It is operated by Gold Fields Ghana and produced 504,000 ounces of gold in 2019. Prestea, operated by Golden Star Resources, is another mining town that has produced substantial amounts of gold over the years.

=== Eastern Region ===
In the Eastern Region, gold mining activities are centered around the Akyem mine, operated by Newmont Ghana. The Akyem mine, one of the gold mines in the region, began commercial production in 2013 and produced over 500,000 ounces of gold in 2020.

=== Western region ===
The Western Region of Ghana, with gold mining activities in towns like Damang, is another producer. The Damang mine, operated by Gold Fields Ghana, produced 164,000 ounces of gold in 2019.

=== Northern Region ===
While not as well known for gold mining as other regions, the Northern Region of Ghana has seen increasing interest in gold exploration, with Galiano Gold and other companies investing in small-scale mining projects in the region.

=== Western North Region ===
The Western North Region has gained attention for its artisanal gold mining activities, especially in areas like Sefwi Wiawso and Bodi. These areas have been known for their gold-bearing areas, and the growth of small-scale mining in this region has contributed to the overall gold production in Ghana.

== Royalties ==
Gold mining companies in Ghana are required to pay royalties as a form of compensation for the extraction of the country's mineral resources. These royalties are governed by the Minerals Income Investment Fund (MIIF) Act, 2018 (Act 978), which establishes mechanisms for managing the royalties and ensuring that the benefits accrue to the state and local communities.

=== Controversy ===
In 2020, the Ghanaian government introduced the Agyapa Royalties deal, designed to monetize a portion of the royalties through a special purpose vehicle listed on the international stock exchanges. The deal sparked public debate due to concerns about transparency and equitable benefits distribution.
