= Alfred Baku =

Ghanaian mining executive

- Born: Alfred Baku
- Education: University of Mines and Technology
- Occupation: Mining executive

Alfred Baku is a Ghanaian mining engineer and executive. He served as the executive vice president and head of West Africa for Gold Fields Limited.

== Early life and education ==
Baku holds a Master of Science degree in Mining Engineering from the University of Mines and Technology in Ghana. He also holds a statutory mine manager's certificate and is a member of the Australian Institute of Mining Metallurgy.

== Career ==
Baku began his career in the mining industry, gaining experience in both Ghana and Australia. He joined Gold Fields in 2002 as a mining engineer and held various positions, including senior mining engineer at the Agnew Mine in Western Australia and roles at the St. Ives Mine in Australia. In 2007, he returned to Ghana to head the mining department of the Damang mine and was appointed general manager of the mine in November 2008.

He became the general manager of the Tarkwa Mine in 2010 and subsequently, the vice President of operations for both mines. In February 2014, he was appointed the executive vice president and head of Gold Fields West Africa, becoming the first Ghanaian to assume this position.

== Honours and recognition ==
In 2018, he was recognized as the Outstanding Mining CEO at the 9th Ghana Entrepreneur and Corporate Executive Awards. In 2020, he received the CEO of the Year award at the 3rd Ghana Business Awards.
