= Gold Fields Ghana Foundation =

Non profit organization in Ghana

- Founded: 2004
- Founder: Gold Fields Ghana Limited
- Purpose: Humanitarian aid, and social service
- Location: Ghana
- Region served: Tarkwa, Damang mine

The Gold Fields Ghana Foundation is the corporate social responsibility (CSR) arm of Gold Fields Ghana Limited, one of the gold mining companies operating in Ghana. The foundation's objective is to improve the socio-economic conditions of communities located around its mining operations through sustainable development programs in education, health, infrastructure, and environmental conservation. Since its establishment, the foundation has allocated more than US$100 million towards development projects and programs in the host communities surrounding the Tarkwa and Damang mines in the Western Region of Ghana.

== History ==
The foundation was established in 2004 as the philanthropic arm of Gold Fields Ghana Limited, ensuring that the company's business operations benefit the surrounding communities. The foundation's scholarship scheme, initiated in 2005, has provided scholarships and bursaries to 2,448 students from host communities, while the graduate trainee program, started in 2018, aims to build a talent pipeline for both Gold Fields and the wider mining industry in Ghana. In 2024, the foundation handed over US$1.53 million worth of legacy projects to host communities, completing 88% of the projects approved by its trustees.
