= Lawlers Gold Mine =

Gold mine in Western Australia

Lawlers
- Location in Western Australia
- Interactive map of Lawlers
- Location: Leinster, Western Australia, Australia; 28°04′31″S 120°32′19″E
- Products: Gold
- Production: 2.27 million ounces
- Financial year: Lifetime (1894–2013)
- Opened: 1894
- Closed: 2013
- Company: Goldfields
- Website: www.goldfields.co.za
- Acquired: 2013

The Lawlers Gold Mine is a gold mine located 23 km south west of Leinster, Western Australia, owned by Gold Fields. Gold Fields purchased the mine in late 2013 and combined it with its nearby Agnew Gold Mine. The process plant of the mine was subsequently sold and dismantled while no mining was carried out at Lawlers.

It was formerly operated by Barrick Gold and part of its Yilgarn South operation, which consisted of Lawlers, the Darlot-Centenary Gold Mine and the Granny Smith Gold Mine. The mine is located in the Norseman-Wiluna greenstone belt.

== History ==
Gold mines in the Mid West region

Gold was first discovered in the region in 1892 and the town side of Lawlers, named after Patrick Lawler who found the first gold in a nearby creek, was established. Of the original town of Lawlers, only the old police station is still standing.

The site, was originally owned by Plutonic Resources, a major Australian gold mining and exploration company. Homestake Mining Company purchased Plutonic in April 1998 for more than $1.0 billion, and, in turn, Homestake was acquired by Barrick Gold at the end of 2001.

Ore at Lawlers is mined in an underground operation.

In June 2009, Lawlers has been certified as fully compliant with the International Cyanide Management Code.

In October 2013, Barrick finalised the sale of their Australian Yilgarn South mines, consisting of the Lawlers, Granny Smith and Darlot mines, to Goldfields. Barrick sold the mines as it considered them high-cost and required cash to compensate for the rising cost of its Pascua-Lama gold project. The three mines accounted for six percent of Barrick's annual gold output at the time. Goldfields purchased the mines for US$300 million, half of which had to be paid in cash while the other half could be issued in shares.

Gold Fields subsequently merged the operations with the nearby Agnew Gold Mine, closing the Lawlers processing plant and processing the ore mined at Lawlers at the Agnew plant. The plant was placed in care and maintenance and purchased by Kin Mining for A$2.5 million in June 2017. Kin relocated the movable assets of the plant 160km north to the Cardinia Gold Mine it was in the process of developing. Subsequently, ownership of the site and remaining plant components was returned to Gold Fields in 2020.

From its opening in 1894 to its closure in 2013, the mine had produced 2.27 million ounces of gold at an average grade of 4.1 grams of gold per tonne.

== Production ==
Annual production of the mine:

=== Lawlers ===
Production of the mine as a stand-alone operation:

Year	Production	Grade	Cost per ounce
2000	101,200 ounces	4.94 g/t	US$215
2001	104,000 ounces	4.45 g/t	US$407
2002	113,291 ounces		US$179
2003	99,223 ounces		US$249
2004	110,374 ounces		US$246
2005	131,000 ounces	0.154 oz/t	US$324
2006	110,000 ounces	0.129 oz/t	US$494
2007	115,000 ounces	0.138 oz/t	US$515

=== Yilgarn South ===
Production figures for the Yilgarn South operation, consisting of Darlot, Granny Smith and Lawlers:

Year	Production	Grade	Cost per ounce
2007	410,000 ounces	0.117	US$486
2008	325,000 ounces	0.125	US$749
2009	352,000 ounces		US$685
2010			
2011			
2012			
2013			
