= List of recipients of the Star of Courage =

Ribbon

The following is an incomplete list of recipients of the Australian Star of Courage, awarded for acts of conspicuous courage in circumstances of great peril.
Source: "itsanhonour.gov.au". Archived from the original on 5 October 2012.

Name	Date		Award ID	Notes
Elizabeth Florence Allen	30 March 1979	5	867054	Confronted armed and dangerous person in hospital ward.
Frank Anderson	27 October 1992	66	867081	(March 1993)
Luke Alan Anderton	27 August 2012	143	1146671	In the evening of 16 April 2011, Senior Constable Luke Anderton attended a two car accident at Clyde North, where he found some people trapped and one vehicle resting on its roof. He ran to the upturned vehicle and, smelling strong fumes, saw a man twisted and trapped inside the cabin. After advising bystanders to move away, Senior Constable Anderton crawled inside the cabin and elevated the man's head, despite leaking fuel falling onto his head and gas discharging from a cylinder into the vehicle. Although he was feeling dizzy and nauseous from the fumes, Senior Constable Anderton remained with the man for almost 40 minutes until he was cut free from the vehicle by emergency services. By his actions, Senior Constable Luke Alan Anderton displayed conspicuous courage.
Stephen William Badger	5 September 1988	38	867051	Attempted rescue of surfer swept against rocks in rough seas.
Scott Daniel Bailey	7 May 1992	63	867079	On the afternoon of 6 July 1991 Scott Bailey, then aged 17, swam through dangerous seas at Cape Freycinet, Western Australia to assist a drowning fisherman. Scott, who was visiting Cape Freycinet with his father and brother, was one of several people in the vicinity when a fisherman fell eight metres from rocks into a heavy sea. Despite cold conditions, a strong current and large swell, Scott stripped, dived 10 metres into the sea, and swam for 15 minutes carrying a sealed bucket and hauling a rescue line. On reaching the unconscious fisherman, Scott spent some time attempting, unsuccessfully, to revive him and then commenced bringing him back to shore. During the return journey the rescue line parted and Scott twice had the fisherman pulled from his grip by rough waves. Scott's condition was reduced by these events and he was forced to abandon his attempt to bring the fisherman to the shore. Scott needed to be assisted from the water by family members and others participating in the rescue attempt from the shore.
Kevin Allan Bennett	12 June 1987	31	867068	Attempted rescue of school boy at Rocky Point, Eagle Bay, Western Australia
Garry Michael Bichler	30 October 1996	87	867142	C of Aust Gazette No. S81. 12 March 1997
Ian Maurice Boughton	11 October 1995	85		On 20 April 1995 Senior Constable Boughton put himself at danger to rescue a diver trapped inside an underwater inlet cooling pipe at the BHP Pumphouse at Port Waratah, Newcastle, New South Wales. The diver was making a routine inspection on the inlet pipe prior to fitting a filter when he was drawn in feet first. The above-water crew, seeing irregularities on the air hose equipment pulled on the security line which broke free from the diver, dislodging his face mask and allowed him to be sucked further into the pipe at great speed. Constable Boughton responded to a call for assistance and although he had no previous underwater diving experience entered the water in a rescue attempt, after first ensuring that the pumps had been switched off. He descended 5 metres below the surface of the water before he located the pipe, which was 1 metre in diameter but had been reduced considerably by the build up of crustacean growth and algae. Carrying a torch Constable Boughton entered the pipe and travelled 3 metres vertically to a bend where visibility was reduced to only centimetres. After moving around the bend and a few metres along the horizontal arm of the pipe he located the diver's hand. He tugged at the unconscious diver a number of times before he was able to pull him free and drag him back through the pipe to the open water where he was lifted from the water.
Constantinos Boukouvalas	5 April 1995	82		Rescue of children from burning cabin at Caravan Park, Sutto
Wayne Thomas Bowen	26 November 1982	17		Assisted in rescue of passengers from crashed helicopter
Robert James Bowman	30 March 1979	6		At about 1 a.m. on 6 September 1978, Bowman, a Municipal Council employee, was driving along Canley Vale Road, Canley Vale, New South Wales, when he saw a house ablaze. Upon enquiring from bystanders he ascertained that two persons were trapped inside the fiercely burning building. Mr Bowman broke away some of the fibro wall sheeting, entered the house but was forced back by the smoke and heat. Although the portion of the building was well alight where the occupants were trapped, he entered the house again and reached the two persons – who were severely burned – and brought them one at a time to safety outside the building. By his conspicuous courage in which he placed himself in great peril Mr Bowman saved the lives of the two persons.
Dominic Boyle	9 April 1997	89		Gaz S179 1997
Jeffery David Brackenrig	12 October 1994	80		Rescue from shark at Julian Rocks, Byron Bay, New South Wales
Paul Bradshaw	31 January 1986	26		Rescued man from burning vehicle after accident
Spencer John Brassey	5 April 1995	83		Rescue of man being stabbed by intoxicated man at Kings Cross, New South Wales
David Ashley Breen	21 February 2005	120		On the afternoon of 21 November 2003, Mr Breen rescued a man from a burning vehicle after an accident at Mount Inkerman, Queensland. Mr Breen was driving north along the Bruce Highway when he noticed an approaching car drift onto the other side of the road, narrowly missing his own vehicle. The car careered across a concrete culvert toward a raised train carriageway before landing upside down on the tracks. Mr Breen saw the accident in his rear vision mirror and called 000 emergency. He then heard the female driver, who had escaped, scream that her husband was trapped in the overturned vehicle. Mr Breen rushed, bare foot, to help. As he approached the car, he noticed smoke coming from the engine bay and that the grass surrounding the car was alight. Mr Breen tried all the doors of the car but they were jammed shut. To free the man he climbed through the front passenger window and dragged him from the burning vehicle. Another person who had arrived on the scene helped Mr Breen move the man to safety. Within 30 seconds the car exploded. In quick succession it then exploded a second time. David lost his hat in the fire, which he also attempted to save. This was later retrieved by the couple, framed with the newspaper clipping of the accident and presented to David. By his actions, Mr Breen displayed conspicuous courage.
Michael Thomas Brown	27 February 2006	126		
Trevor Ronald Burns	25 March 2013	144		On 30 October 2010, Mr Burns rescued a woman from a shark attack north east of Garden Island, near Rockingham, Western Australia. The woman was a female dive guide with a group of about twelve tourists swimming with dolphins as part of a Rockingham Wild Encounters tour. As the woman was engaging dolphins to interact with the tourists she was suddenly and violently attacked by a three-metre shark. Mr Burns, who was snorkeling with other members of the tour group, saw the violent attack, and immediately grabbed the shark's tail in an attempt to pull it off her. As he held on, the shark began to thrash about, aggressively throwing Mr Burn around in the water. Soon after, the shark released its grip on the woman, and swam off. After hearing a warning alarm coming from the boat, all of the swimmers swam to the boat except for Mr Burns. Despite a large amount of blood in the water, and the whereabouts of the shark unknown, he dove down about four metres to the injured woman who was sinking below him. Mr Burns pulled her to the surface and swam a short distance to the boat where he lifted her onto the back landing amongst others who were trying to get out of the water. Mr Burns ensured everyone was safe before he left the water. The woman survived the attack but received significant injuries to her legs which required over 200 stitches and several operations.
Francis Xavier Carmody	28 April 1989	42		9 August 1989 for assisting with the disarming of an armed man who had wounded and killed workers in an Australia Post building in Melbourne during the Queen Street massacre.
Colin Wrenville Carter	6 February 1981	14		(Posthumous award). 6 May 1981. On 2 December 1979, Mr. Carter was asked to help contain a bush fire in the Mount White-Calga area, New South Wales. With 3 others they cut a fire break. A change of wind direction caused the fire to change direction making it necessary for all to...
Lorraine Mary Casey	22 August 2011	140		On 7 February 2009, Ms Casey rescued her friend and colleague during the ‘Black Saturday bushfires' at Kinglake, Victoria. In the midst of the Black Saturday bushfires, Ms Casey, a member of the Country Fire Authority (CFA), assisted her friend to defend her house in Bald Spur Road, Kinglake from the firestorm. With safety considerations paramount, her friend asked Ms Casey to leave as the fire front approached. Ms Casey managed to return to the Kinglake CFA shed and remained until the fire front had passed. As darkness approached, Ms Casey became aware that her friend's situation had become dire, so decided to drive back to assist. She drove through the fire-stricken forest until she was unable to travel further due to the fallen and burning trees which had blocked Bald Spur Road. Using a torch, Ms Casey left the safety of her vehicle and walked about 600 metres along the road until she found her friend, badly injured and almost unconscious. In very difficult conditions, Ms Casey assisted her friend back to the vehicle and again negotiated fallen trees to return to the main road and back to the CFA shed. With no ambulances available, local police officers were able to transport the woman to Whittlesea to receive urgently needed medical attention. By her actions, Ms Casey displayed conspicuous courage.
Timothy David Champion	14 February 2000	102		Police Marine and Rescue Services, Tasmania Police
Earpeng Chea	19 May 1999	101		SC. Gaz S370. 23 Aug 99
Tiani Michelle Chillemi	26 October 1993	76		Attempted rescue of woman who was being stabbed at Moranbah, Queensland
Barbara Ann Clark	18 April 1991	56		Rescue from armed offender at Wynnum West, Queensland
Shaun Jason Clements	8 March 2004	117		Corporal Clements was a crew member of a tank taking part in an Australian Army training exercise at the Shoalwater Bay Military Training Area in Queensland.
Ben Michael Clohessy	17 October 2003	113		
Michael Paul Cole	26 October 1993	77		
Alfred Collins	9 August 1985	24		
Larry James Cook	21 December 1988	41		For the attempted rescue of a windsurfer in heavy seas off Spoon Bay near Wamberal Beach, Central Coast, New South Wales.
Robert Cook	17 March 2008	132		On 29 July 2006, Mr Cook shielded an Australian passenger during a plane crash at St Louis, Missouri, United States of America. Whilst visiting and working in the US, a young Australian woman joined a group of people to make a tandem skydive. Her instructor was Mr Robert Cook with whom she would be harnessed for the skydive. Soon after take-off from an airport near St Louis, Missouri, the plane experienced serious engine malfunctions and the pilot attempted to return to the airstrip. Mr Cook, an experienced instructor, turned to the woman and calmly told her that the plane was likely to crash. Instructing her to focus solely on his instructions, Mr Cook clipped his skydive harness to hers, demanding that the woman wrap herself around him so that he could cushion her fall. As the aircraft lost altitude and crashed through a tree, the woman remembers being jostled around and slipping to the floor of the plane. Mr Cook pulled her back onto the seat and again pressed her against him. Moments later the plane hit an electrical wire and, as it plunged towards the ground, Mr Cook tightened his grip around the woman, acting as a human shield to protect her. Having entirely understood the implications of his actions, and as a result of his selfless courage, the woman, although seriously injured in the crash, survived the impact. Sadly Mr Cook died instantly as a result of his injuries. By his actions, Mr Cook displayed conspicuous bravery, thereby losing his life.
Phillip Anthony Critchlow	31 January 1987	30		Attempted to rescue man in rough seas
Patrick Alexander Cullinan	6 November 1987	35		16 March 1988. By his action Major Cullinan displayed conspicuous courage in most perilous circumstances by rescuing a German mountain climber, at an altitude of 8000m, on the summit ridge of Broad Peak in the Karakoram mountain range, Pakistan.
Grant John Cumming	14 February 2000	103		
Sandro De Maria	12 August 2002	110		
Gavin Dengate	29 April 1998	95		Rescue of boy from flooded underground storm water drains
David John Doyle	6 August 2001	107		
Alan David Dwyer	30 October 1991	59		Boral Liquid Petroleum Gas storage facility fire and explosions at St Peters, New South Wales
Matthew Andrew Eames	12 April 1994	79		Attempted rescue of man from sea at Salmon Holes via Albany, Western Australia
Perry Philip Eckert	28 April 1989	43		
Rodney Lew Edwards	16 March 1988	37		Queensland Police Service. – 16 March 1988. By his actions Constable Edwards displayed conspicuous courage in most perilous circumstances.
Mark Eldridge	26 November 1982	18		Rescued passengers from burning helicopter after crash
Robert John Elliott	9 April 1997	90		Commonwealth Gazette S374 (1997) – 28 April 1996. During the Port Arthur massacre, he attempted to confront and disarm the gunman, Martin Bryant. In doing so, he diverted the attacker’s attention from people hiding nearby and was shot in the arm and head. He survived his injuries.
Brian Daniel Farley	6 August 2001	108		
Robert McKenzie Fenwick	19 March 2012	142		Mr Robert McKenzie Fenwick deceased, late of Orange, New South Wales. On the afternoon of 5 January 2011, Nurse, Mr Robert Fenwick and a female colleague were attending to a patient at a hospital in Orange. For reasons of privacy, the female nurse left the bedroom, when another patient entered through the door armed with a steak knife in each hand. He lunged at the female nurse causing a severe laceration to her right hand, nearly severing her little finger. The nurse yelled for help. Mr Fenwick immediately left the room and placed himself between the offender and his colleague, when he was stabbed in the chest, receiving multiple lacerations to his body. Despite his injuries, Mr Fenwick, and his patient, who came to assist, forced the offender outside. Mr Fenwick grabbed a broom and defended himself with it. The offender backed off and security staff apprehended him. Sadly, after being transported to Westmead Hospital, Mr Fenwick died the next morning. His colleague received surgery to reattach her little finger. By his actions, Mr Fenwick displayed conspicuous courage.
Rodney Joseph Fiechtner	27 February 2006	127		
Kevin James Fletcher	30 October 1991	60		Boral Liquid Petroleum Gas storage facility fire and explosions at St Peters, New South Wales
Ronald Gianoncelli	15 March 2010	138		On the morning of 31 January 2004, Mr Gianoncelli intervened during an armed robbery at a newsagency in Koondoola, Western Australia.
Anthony Dominic Gioia	28 April 1989	44		For assisting with the disarming of an armed man who had wounded and killed workers in an Australia Post building in Melbourne during the Queen Street massacre.
Terry Heydon Gleeson	10 September 1976	1		For the attempted rescue of a man from a tunnel filled with fumes. The first Star of Courage was awarded to Terry Heydon Gleeson in 1976. On 5 October 1974, two men were painting the interior of a tidal marker when an explosion occurred, filling the buoyancy chamber with fumes. Mr Gleeson entered the tunnel to the chamber, carrying a lead light and air hose, in an attempt to find one of the men who was still trapped inside the chamber. This attempt proved unsuccessful. Mr Gleeson then re-entered the tunnel with a torch and a longer air hose. He found the badly burned man lying unconscious, and attempted to rescue him from the chamber until he himself was affected by the fumes.
Natalie Joy Goold	17 October 2003	114		For rescuing her severely injured friend, Nicole McLean, from the burning ruins of Paddy's Bar in the immediate aftermath of the Bali bombings of 12 October 2002.
Lee Nigel Gordon-Brown	29 August 2005	122		
Craig Ian Graham	12 October 1994	81		
Mitchell John Hancock	7 May 1992	64		(Sep 92).
Patrick Harland	11 March 1983	20		(Posthumous award) – Gazette S100 27 May 1983. Mr Harland displayed conspicuous courage in giving chase to two armed and dangerous men and persisting in the pursuit of them notwithstanding the fact that he was continuously in great peril.
Wayne Andrew Harris	28 April 1989	45		Rescue from burning aeroplane
Noel Albert Heden	8 March 1999	100		
Vernon Gregory Hill	30 October 1996	88		
James Wallace Hocking	19 August 2015	146		(Posthumous award) Hocking, an RAAF pilot, on 28 July 1944, ordered the crew of his Short Stirling bomber to bale out while he steered the burning aircraft away from the town of March, Cambridgeshire. Hocking died in the crash and is buried in Cambridge. He was from Nambour, Queensland.
Michael Lewis Holden	26 November 1982	19		For rescuing passengers from a burning helicopter after a crash.
Matthew Allan Hunter	14 April 1993	72		For the rescue of a surfer after a shark attack at Duranbah Beach, New South Wales.
Kevin Michael Hurley	29 March 1993	71		For the rescue of the crew of the burning oil tanker Kikri in heavy seas off the reefs near Wedge Island off the Western Australian coast on 21 July 1991.
Stephen William Hyland	2 March 2009	135		On the night of 7 March 2004, Mr Hyland assisted in the rescue of two women being attacked by a man at Birkdale, Queensland. On the night in question, Mr Hyland was standing on the front landing of his house when he heard frantic screams from across the road. He saw two women run to a next door neighbour's house, thump desperately on the screen door and call out for the police to be called. Moments later the women were confronted by a young man. In a rage the man raised a sword and struck out at the women, severely injuring both of them. Mr Hyland raced to confront the attacker, picking up a second weapon dropped earlier by the offender. Mr Hyland repeatedly demanded the man back away, which resulted in the offender moving away a short distance from the victims. As he did so, Mr Hyland jumped in and stood between the offender and the women, mirroring the offender's movements as he tried again to get at his victims. As the women attempted to escape, the offender pursued them, quickly followed by Mr Hyland who challenged the offender again. One of the women ran up behind Mr Hyland for protection and as he shielded her she desperately screamed for help. Mr Hyland resolutely maintained his position in the standoff, calling out to others in the street to contact the police. The sound of police in the distance spooked the offender and he quickly fled the scene. Mr Hyland checked the condition of the two victims, reassuring them until police and ambulance arrived at the scene. The offender was later apprehended by police. By his actions, Mr Hyland displayed conspicuous courage.
Glenn Kenneth James	30 March 1979	7		Through his initiative Mr James placed himself in great peril and by his conspicuous courage rescued three persons caught in a rip in heavy surf, which was sweeping them towards a rocky headland.
Ken Janakievski	16 August 2010	139		On the night of 9 June 2006, Mr Janakievski attempted to detain an armed robber escaping from a holdup at a hotel at St Peters, New South Wales. Around midnight, four men armed with a shot gun and large knives entered a hotel at St Peters. They spread out in the public bar area, and began to menace patrons and staff. They screamed aggressively as they rounded up their victims, ordering them into an adjacent room and on to the floor. The duty hotel manager, Mr Janakievski, was attacked from behind and forced to open a safe, and then threatened by another offender armed with the shot gun as cash was also removed from one of the registers. The offenders continued to intimidate and yell obscenities at the patrons as they were ordered to hand over wallets and mobile phones. Mr Janakievski was made to move into the room with the victims where he was again threatened by the offender armed with the shot gun. The weapon was raised to shoulder level, and aimed at him at point blank range. Fearing for the safety of his customers, Mr Janakievski lunged at the offender and was able to wrestle the gun from him, prompting the robbers to flee from the hotel. Reacting instinctively, Mr Janakievski pursued them out into the street and tried to detain one of the offenders. As the robbers escaped by car, Mr Janakievski learnt that one of his customers had sustained a critical knife wound. Running to his aid, Mr Janakievski dropped to the ground and applied pressure to the man's chest wound then commenced Cardiopulmonary Resuscitation. Sadly, the victim's injury was fatal. By his actions, Mr Janakievski displayed conspicuous bravery.
Robert John Jeppesen	1 November 1990	52		For alerting residents of burning hotel at Longreach, Queensland.
Stephen Jury	14 October 1983	21		For rescuing an unconscious man from the path of oncoming train at Boronia railway station, Victoria.
Alan Hafiz Karam	12 September 1980	12		Prevented payroll robbery at the Randwick Bus Depot, New South Wales
William Kerr	10 September 1976	2		On 25 December 1975, Mr Kerr attempted to rescue an employee who had fallen down a well while carrying out repairs to a petrol driven pump in the well. Mr Kerr entered the well which was filled with carbon monoxide fumes. On reaching the bottom of the well he attempted to rescue the employee but collapsed when he was overcome by the fumes. Mr Kerr's actions in attempting to rescue his employee cost him his life.
Peter Grahame Kidd	28 April 1989	46		Queensland Police Service operation to apprehend an armed offender
Duncan Gordon King	1 October 1998	98		New South Wales Police Service. S78 1999
Gregory Clifton Kirkham	9 April 1997	91		Gaz S179 1997
Bernard Kozakiewicz	30 October 1991	61		Apprehended two armed offenders at Wyong, New South Wales
John Joseph Lanigan	30 January 1987	29		Tackled armed robber during hold-up
Daniel Francis Lloyd	9 August 1985	25		On 28 July 1984 the yacht Larina was anchored off Beagle Reef 200 km north of Derby, Western Australia. A crew member went for a swim and was carried away by the current. Mr Lloyd and others threw her a ring with rope attached but she drifted further. Aware the waters were in...
William Percival Lowther	5 September 1988	39		Rescued 3 men from treacherous seas at the Murray Mouth, South Australia
Joanne Margaretha Lucas	17 August 2009	137		On the morning of 10 May 2008, Mrs Lucas rescued a man who had been attacked by a shark at Middleton Beach, Albany, Western Australia.
David Harry John Lumb	30 October 1991	62		(May 1992).
Grahame Douglas Mackelmann	11 April 1980	10		Hijack incident on a Trans Australia Airlines (TAA) flight from Coolangatta to Brisbane on 8 June 1979
Peta-Lynn Mann	7 August 1981	16		31 August 1981. On 17 April 1981, Peta-Lynn Mann aged 12 saved Mr. H Graham from a crocodile attack. The crocodile seized Mr Graham by the arm Miss Mann pulled him free. The crocodile returned to the attack seized Mr Graham by the thigh & spun h
Alexander James Mar	29 April 1998	96		S287 1998
Paul Eugene Maros	1 October 1998	99		S78 1999
Lillian Beryl Marshall	3 May 1990	50		19 September 1990
Ralph Dudley Masters	26 October 1989	47		Rescue from armed offenders robbing Commonwealth Bank
Lorraine Kaye McLeod	31 January 1986	27		Rescued man from burning helicopter, although herself injured
Craig Douglas McNaughton	31 January 1986	28		Rescued man from burning vehicle after accident
Rachelle McNiven	27 October 1992	67		(Mar 93)
Bruce Wallace McPherson	31 August 1979	8		Located and rescued sea captain from sunken trawler
Allan Wayne McQueen	26 October 1989	48		Pursuit of armed offender at Woolloomooloo
Gregory Charles Meagher	27 October 1992	68		For the rescue of the crew of the burning oil tanker Kikri in heavy seas off the reefs near Wedge Island off the Western Australian coast on 21 July 1991.
Robert Alan Meredith	17 October 2003	115		
Robert George Miller	14 February 2000	104		
Christin Mueller	3 May 1990	51		19 September 1990
Lauren John Munro	17 October 2003	116		
Dennis Patrick Murphy	27 July 1984	23		Killed by shark while attempting to lead it from 2 friends
Sean Daniel Murphy	1 November 1990	53		Gazette No. S 67 16 March 1991
Darren Leigh Neil	26 October 1993	78		Assisted police in disarming armed offender at Creswick, Victoria
Robert Beresford Nelson	12 September 1980	13		Prevented payroll robbery at Randwick Bus Depot, New South Wales
James Joseph O'Brien	21 August 2000	106		Northern Territory Police Service
Sharon Elaine O'Leary	18 April 1991	57		Rescue from armed offender at Wynnum West, Queensland
Kerri-Anne O'Meley	17 March 2008	133		In the early hours of the morning of 17 June 2005, Miss O’Meley went to the aid of family members during a vicious attack in their home at Wallsend, New South Wales. Just after midnight, Miss O’Meley's estranged husband illegally entered the family home of his former wife, her parents and her two teenage children. The man located Miss O’Meley asleep in the house, woke her and, in a frenzied attack, stabbed her repeatedly. Miss O’Meley's mother and father were awoken by the noise and, caught between their daughter and the offender, they too were viciously stabbed. The man made his way to his daughter's bedroom where the attacks continued. He repeatedly stabbed his daughter, injuring her legs and throat. She tried to fend him off and, as a result, was also cut across the hands. Despite significant stab wounds to her chest, and weakened by the considerable loss of blood, Miss O’Meley displayed extreme courage in frightening circumstances. Without regard for her own life she protected her daughter from further attack by grappling with her estranged husband, pushing him away. As a result, Miss O’Meley was stabbed again, several times, before the offender fled the scene. Sadly, Miss O’Meley and her father died as a result of their significant injuries sustained in the tragedy. By her actions, Miss O’Meley displayed conspicuous bravery, thereby losing her life.
John Johnston Laird Parker	1 November 1990	54		Attempted to disarm offender at Camden, New South Wales
Jeffrey Parkinson	6 February 1981	15		Attempted to disarm assailant and protect female companion
Alan John Playford	15 October 1997	93		On the morning of 18 June 1996, Mr Playford, an Ambulance Service Paramedic, was directed, with his partner, to attend a burning house in Eleebana where an elderly woman was trapped inside. On arrival, Mr Playford was advised by her neighbours that the woman was still inside. Although the building was engulfed by flames and smoke, Mr Playford, without regard for his own safety, was hosed down and, covering his head with a wet curtain, crawled into the hallway. He searched the bedroom and bathroom then located the woman lying on the kitchen floor. As he approached her, the lounge room ceiling collapsed behind him. In spite of this Mr Playford continued crawling towards the unconscious woman until the kitchen ceiling and roof collapsed burying her under tonnes of debris. Mr Playford was knocked over by the resulting blast of hot air, and breathed in hot ash and smoke. Shortly afterwards he was found semi-conscious by fire officers and conveyed to hospital where he was treated for severe smoke inhalation. By his actions Mr Playford displayed conspicuous courage.(CofA Gazette No. 45, Saturday, 14 February 1998)
Brett Pollard	5 May 1978	4		Rescued friend from heavy surf – 1.5 hours effort
Russell Charles Priest	5 April 1995	84		Disarmed offender at Boronia, Victoria
Timothy Henry Procter	1 November 1990	55		Attempted rescue of five fellow miners at Emu Mine, Agnew, Western Australia
Gary John Proctor	9 April 1997	92		Mid-air collision between two Blackhawk Army helicopters at the High Range Training Area near Townsville, Queensland in the 1996 Blackhawk accident
Esme Qazim	11 April 1980	11		21 May 1980. Miss Qazim displayed conspicuous courage in attacking an armed and dangerous hijacker on a Trans Australia Airlines (TAA) flight from Coolangatta to Brisbane on 8 June 1979
Phillip David Queripel	14 April 1993	73		Rescued electrocuted fellow linesman at Bradfordville, Goulburn, New South Wales
Gregory Christopher Read	27 October 1992	69		(March 1993)
Francis Clarence Richards	12 June 1987	32		Rescued girl and handicapped boy from burning house
Geoffrey Douglas Robinson	12 August 2004	118		
Robert Jordan Rodgers	18 April 1991	58		Rescue from armed offender at Wynnum West, Queensland
Leah Helene Rudder	12 March 2007	130		In the early morning of 10 April 2003, New South Wales Police Force Senior Constable Rudder rescued an unconscious man from a burning house at Tarro, New South Wales
James Richard Runham	10 April 1996	86		Pursued armed robber at Ipswich, Queensland
Joseph Robert Neil Ryder	15 October 1997	94		Rendered assistance to neighbours, assaulted by man, machete
Laurence Charles Sams	6 August 2001	109		
Dennis Allan Savage	12 August 2004	119		
Stephen Robert Shirtliff	12 June 1987	33		Rescued man from burning car after accident
Daryl John Smith	12 March 2007	131		
Alicia Violet Sorohan	27 February 2006	128		
Katie Louise Steadman	12 August 2002	111		
Leslie Peter Strugnell	14 April 1993	74		Disarmed offender in the Kalgoorlie/Boulder City Council
Brian Colin John Summers	6 November 1987	36		16 March 1988. By his actions Senior Constable Summers displayed conspicuous courage in most perilous circumstances. Western Australia Police Force
Colin Jeremy Sutton	29 August 2005	123		
Paul John Sycamnias	14 April 1993	75		Disarmed an offender in St Kilda Road, Melbourne
Michael Francis Symes	7 May 1992	65		(September 1992). Queensland Police Service
Oguz Hakan Taskun	18 September 2006	129		
Stephen Richard Thomas	12 August 2002	112		Saved friend from shark attack.
Garry Lawrence Thornton	10 February 1984	22		Rescued woman from cliff face
John Duncan Thurgar	30 November 1979	9		On 9 October 1979 Chief Inspector Thurgar, an officer of the 16th Australian Police Contingent attached to the United Nations Force in Cyprus, was on duty at Ormophita, a suburb of Nicosia, when a person driving a tractor entered a mine field area within the Buffer' Zone separating the Greek Cypriot and Turkish Cypriot Forces. The tractor struck a mine, overturning it and severely injured the driver. Chief Inspector Thurgar immediately crossed through the mine field to the injured person. He then picked up the injured person and returned through the mine field so that medical care could be obtained; in doing so he saved the person's life. Chief Inspector Thurgar displayed conspicuous courage and placed himself in great peril in traversing the mine field to rescue the injured person.
Stephen Charles Timmins	5 September 1988	40		Disarmed offender holding hostages
Michael Anthony Tucker	2 March 2009	136		In the early hours of 12 January 2008, Mr Tucker rescued two children from a burning house at Cranbourne, Victoria. Mr Tucker heard the sound of a nearby smoke alarm and on investigating saw a neighbouring house on fire. He ran to the building to see a mother and father screaming that two of their children were still inside. Mr Tucker raced into the house where sections of the roof had already collapsed and with dense choking smoke restricted his visibility, he was forced to retreat. Mr Tucker grabbed a torch and re-entered the house only to find the light was of no use in the thick blanket of smoke. Covering his face and mouth with a dressing gown, Mr Tucker entered the building for a third time. He struggled through the house but found that access to the children's bedroom was blocked by huge flames. He then raced outside to the back of the building and climbed through a window. He was feeling overcome by the heat and his breathing was dangerously impaired by the black toxic smoke. As Mr Tucker felt his way around inside he stumbled over the two children huddled together under a doona. The smoke was so thick and disorienting that Mr Tucker could no longer see where he had entered the room. As the fire began to consume the house Mr Tucker persisted with his efforts and instinctively found his way back to the opening. One by one he passed the children to the arms of waiting neighbours. Exhausted and overcome by smoke, Mr Tucker fell through the window and slowly crawled away from the burning house. He was helped over a fence where ambulance administered first aid. By his actions, Mr Tucker displayed conspicuous courage.
John Thomas Turner	27 October 1992	70		New South Wales Police Service. (March 1993)
Trevor Allan Viney	26 October 1989	49		Rescue from shark attack at Waitpinga, South Australia
William Maria Visser	14 February 2000	105		
Ronald James Wall	29 August 2005	124		
Shane Robert Warburton	17 March 2008	134		In the late afternoon of 2 April 2005, Mr (then Leading Seaman) Warburton rescued a leading aircraftman from a Royal Australian Navy Sea King helicopter which crashed at Tuindrao, Nias Island, Indonesia. During its deployment to assist earthquake victims in Indonesia, a Royal Australian Navy Sea King helicopter crashed near the village of Tuindrao on Nias Island, Indonesia. Leading Seaman Warburton was aboard the helicopter and sustained severe injuries. He was trapped in the rear of the cabin which was on fire and quickly filling with thick black smoke. The cockpit had caved in and the two pilots were deceased. Leading Seaman Warburton tried to rouse other passengers, and found one other person alive. He inched his way through the debris and found a service colleague with horrible leg fractures and other injuries. Although almost overcome by exhaustion and restricted by choking black smoke, he summoned his strength and determination and dragged the victim as far as he could to a small opening in the tail of the helicopter, where he shouted for help. As Leading Seaman Warburton was pulled from the wreckage by local villagers he pleaded with them to rescue his mate from the aircraft. After the second rescue attempt succeeded, Leading Seaman Warburton attempted to return to the crash site to search for other victims but was restrained by the villagers when a series of explosions accelerated the fire. Sadly, the remaining personnel on the helicopter died in the crash. By his actions, Leading Seaman Warburton displayed conspicuous bravery.
Mervyn Williams	16 September 1977	3		On 27 March 1977, a young man was washed from rocks at Twilight Beach near Esperance, Western Australia. The sea was very rough and was forming breakers approximately twenty feet high that were breaking against a vertical rock face resulting in strong undercurrents. Mervyn Williams entered the water on a surfboard and made his way out to the man, a distance of about 50 metres, taking a line with him. He supported the man until a lifebuoy could be launched along the line and he then assisted the man into the lifebuoy. Both men were now weak. After a further 30 minutes in the surf both men were exhausted and Mr Williams urged the people on shore to drag them up onto the rock face. This attempt failed as the line broke when they were approximately 3 metres from the rock face. They were then thrown repeatedly against the rocks and dragged out to sea again. Eventually, they were picked up by a wave and dumped in a crevice under the overhanging rocks from where they hauled to safety. Although he was weakened by the extremely cold waters and risked being either swept out to sea or dashed against the rocks, Mr Williams kept hold of the man and assisted him until they both were rescued. The rescue would not have been possible but for the conspicuous courage displayed by Mr Williams in putting his own life in peril.
John Roy Wust	21 February 2005	121		On the afternoon of 3 August 2003, Mr Wust rescued a man and a woman from a burning vehicle after an accident on the Leichhardt Highway near Biloela, Queensland. Mr Wust was travelling south with his wife on the Leichhardt Highway towards Biloela when he saw a station wagon on its roof with large amounts of smoke coming from the engine. Mr Wust stopped his car and asked his wife to turn on the hazard warning lights and to ring 000 emergency. He then ran to the overturned vehicle and saw a man and woman trapped inside in their seats. Both were unconscious. The driver's door was jammed and the car had burst into flames. Mr Wust realised the man and woman would burn to death if he did not act quickly. After considerable effort, he forced open the back door on the driver's side, freed the female driver from her seat belt and dragged her out of the car. The flames were now spreading, with the engine compartment well alight. Mr Wust could feel the heat from the front of the car. Although someone yelled at him not to go back into the vehicle because it was about to explode, Mr Wust returned to help the trapped male passenger. He climbed over the heavy set man and managed to free his broken foot and drag him through the back door of the car. Other people helped Mr Wust to move the man and the woman away from the car before it exploded. By his actions, Mr Wust displayed conspicuous courage.
Craig Leslie Young	12 June 1987	34		Rescued persons from burning building
Charles Zerafa	22 August 2011	141		On the morning of 9 May 2006, Mr Zerafa assisted a wounded police officer and confronted an armed offender at Mangalore, Tasmania. Mr Zerafa was travelling along the Midland Highway at Mangalore, Tasmania, with a friend when he came upon a police vehicle and another vehicle stopped by the side of the road. Two other drivers had stopped by the vehicle and were attempting to assist a police officer, who had been shot and was lying on the ground. One of the men notified police on the police radio of the situation, and informed Mr Zerafa and his friend that a man was armed with a gun. As the two men moved away, Mr Zerafa approached the wounded officer and checked for a response. Despite the considerable risk to his own safety, he then yelled to the armed offender and tried to negotiate with him, but the man responded by pointing a gun directly at him. Mr Zerafa moved away as the offender knelt down beside the wounded police officer. The offender then went to back to his vehicle and appeared to be reloading his weapon, which allowed Mr Zerafa the opportunity to return to the police officer. While continually trying to negotiate with the gunman Mr Zerafa inched closer to him, however the offender responded by pointing the gun at him again. Mr Zerafa continued negotiating until the police arrived and arrested the man By his actions, Mr Zerafa displayed conspicuous courage.
Andrew MacDonald	24 March 2014	145		On the morning of 5 August 2010, Mr Andrew MacDonald rescued a colleague from an armed offender at Bonnyrigg, New South Wales. Mr MacDonald was working as a department manager at a major retail store in Bonnyrigg when three men entered the store and requested to speak to the store loss prevention officer. As he was speaking with them the undercover loss prevention officer approached and identified himself. The men requested he go outside with them, before an argument ensued and they began to assault him. As the men wrestled, a handgun was produced and aimed at the victim's stomach. Mr MacDonald called for help, as he pushed one of the offenders away and managed to keep the two other men on the ground which allowed the victim to run away and hide elsewhere inside the store. After the offenders got up, Mr MacDonald warned other staff and customers to stay back as he followed the men and ordered them outside despite them threatening to shoot him. When the offenders departed through the back exit and headed to their trucks Mr MacDonald prevented staff and customers from leaving the store for their own safety before one of the men fired two shots towards where he and others were standing. By his actions, Mr MacDonald displayed conspicuous courage.
Michael Nerandzic	18 August 2014	146		
Matthew Royston O'Grady	26 March 2017	161		
Luke Adam Jacobs	26 March 2017	160		
Jayden Riley Caulfield	26 March 2017	159		
Cameron Deane Caulfield	26 March 2017	158		
Nada Lynda Bayley	26 March 2017	157		
Jimmy Wayne Bateman	17 August 2016	156		
Timothy John Bunyan	17 August 2016	155		
Peter Robert Hackwood	17 August 2016	154		
Clinten Thomas McCarthy	17 August 2016	153		
Jake Paul Sullivan	17 August 2016	152		
Nathan James Thompson	17 August 2016	151		
Nicholas William Thompson	17 March 2016	150		
Christiana Jane King	30 March 2015	147		
Angela Edith Ferullo	30 March 2015	148		
Dermot Michael O'Toole	26 March 2017	162		In the afternoon of 12 July 2013, Mr O'Toole came to the assistance of his wife during an armed robbery at a jewellery store in Hastings, Victoria. Mr O’Toole and his wife were working at the back of their jewellery store, when they heard the door to the store open. Mrs O’Toole moved into the main area where she was met by a man in disguise walking towards the counter. The offender yelled at her and she noticed that he was holding something in his right hand which turned out to be a large, 20 cm carving knife. A struggle ensued between the woman and the offender before he pushed her onto a large counter in the middle of the store. Mr O'Toole immediately rushed from the back of the shop in order to render assistance to his wife who was screaming. The offender then pushed the woman into the store's glass display cabinets. Mr O'Toole confronted the armed offender and wrestled with him before slipping over and landing on his back. He attempted to fend off the offender who then stabbed him with the knife. The offender further assaulted the woman before stealing a range of rings and leaving the store. Sadly, Mr O'Toole died as a result of his injuries. By his actions, Mr O'Toole displayed conspicuous courage.
Tori Johnson	14 March 2018	162		
Antonio Rokov	14 March 2018	163		
Richard Harris	24 July 2018	164		Between 6 and 10 July 2018, Dr Craig Challen and Dr Richard Harris were involved in the rescue of 12 young boys and their soccer coach from a flooded cave in the Tham Luang cave system in Northern Thailand. On 23 June 2018, 12 young boys and their soccer coach became trapped in the 9.6 km long Tham Luang cave system in Northern Thailand. On 25 June, Thai Navy Seal divers entered the complex and began the search for the boys and their coach but were forced back by rising water. On 27 June, the Prime Minister of Thailand sought international assistance and an Australian Federal Police Specialist Response Group arrived on the scene to search for the missing group. They were later joined by an Australian Defence Force Clearance Diver. On 2 July, two members of a British expedition located the boys and their coach. Dr Harris, an anaesthetist and member of the Australian Medical Assistance Team, and his dive partner, Dr Craig Challen arrived at the scene on 6 July, and the next day they entered the cave system and reached the boys and their coach. Dr Harris conducted initial medical assessments and was able to provide information to the awaiting authorities regarding the safest extraction methods. The rescue mission was hazardous, with poor or zero visibility, debris and constrictive passageways, variable air quality, and made more difficult with further rainfalls predicted. The order of evacuation was decided, and on 8 July Dr Harris again entered the cave system, reached the boys and provided medical support for the extraction of the first four boys. Dr Challen assisted to de-kit the boys of their diving equipment in one section of the evacuation route. The boys were then transferred from harnesses to stretchers and carried to the next section where they were re-kitted and prepared for the next dive. This procedure was repeated until the boys reached Chamber Three, where they were assessed before being taken to a nearby field hospital. During the extractions, Dr Challen stayed inside the cave system and Dr Harris remained in Chamber Nine with the coach and boys. The extraction process was repeated on 9 July with Dr Harris and Dr Challen performing the same duties, resulting in four more boys being safely extracted from the cave. On 10 July, the final four boys and their coach were extracted using the same method. By his actions, Dr Richard Harris displayed conspicuous courage.
Craig Challen	24 July 2018	165		Between 6 and 10 July 2018, Dr Craig Challen and Dr Richard Harris were involved in the rescue of 12 young boys and their soccer coach from a flooded cave in the Tham Luang cave system in Northern Thailand. On 23 June 2018, 12 young boys and their soccer coach became trapped in the 9.6 km long Tham Luang cave system in Northern Thailand. On 25 June, Thai Navy Seal divers entered the complex and began the search for the boys and their coach but were forced back by rising water. On 27 June, the Prime Minister of Thailand sought international assistance and an Australian Federal Police Specialist Response Group arrived on the scene to search for the missing group. They were later joined by an Australian Defence Force Clearance Diver. On 2 July, two members of a British expedition located the boys and their coach. Dr Harris, an anaesthetist and member of the Australian Medical Assistance Team, and his dive partner, Dr Craig Challen arrived at the scene on 6 July, and the next day they entered the cave system and reached the boys and their coach. Dr Harris conducted initial medical assessments and was able to provide information to the awaiting authorities regarding the safest extraction methods. The rescue mission was hazardous, with poor or zero visibility, debris and constrictive passageways, variable air quality, and made more difficult with further rainfalls predicted. The order of evacuation was decided, and on 8 July Dr Harris again entered the cave system, reached the boys and provided medical support for the extraction of the first four boys. Dr Challen assisted to de-kit the boys of their diving equipment in one section of the evacuation route. The boys were then transferred from harnesses to stretchers and carried to the next section where they were re-kitted and prepared for the next dive. This procedure was repeated until the boys reached Chamber Three, where they were assessed before being taken to a nearby field hospital. During the extractions, Dr Challen stayed inside the cave system and Dr Harris remained in Chamber Nine with the coach and boys. The extraction process was repeated on 9 July with Dr Harris and Dr Challen performing the same duties, resulting in four more boys being safely extracted from the cave. On 10 July, the final four boys and their coach were extracted using the same method. By his actions, Dr Richard Harris displayed conspicuous courage.
Martha Molyneaux Knox-Haly	20 August 2018	166		On the morning of 18 August 2015, Dr Martha Knox-Haly went to the assistance of a female colleague who was being assaulted at Carramar in New South Wales. At 8am Dr Knox-Haly was walking through the car park of her office in Carramar when she became concerned for a colleague, believing that a road rage incident was occurring. Her colleague's car had been parked-in by another vehicle and her colleague was seated in her vehicle with the driver's door open and a man from the second vehicle was on his knees and looked like he was sobbing into his hands. Her colleague looked very frightened and concerned. She spoke to her colleague to check on her welfare. When the man stated he was her husband, her colleague gave a warning gesture with her hand which Dr Knox-Haly thought meant that she wanted her to leave. As she began to walk to her office she heard her colleague scream. The man had dragged her colleague from the car and was holding her from behind. Her colleague then slumped to ground after the man stabbed her several times with a knife. Dr Knox-Haly yelled to the offender to get away from her colleague and moved towards him. As she pushed him away from her colleague he wounded Dr Knox-Haly in the head with the knife. Despite the presence of the armed offender, and with blood coming from her head wound, she knelt down to assist her colleague. The offender got into his vehicle and drove towards the women at speed, forcing Dr Knox-Haly to move. He then hit the injured woman with the vehicle. Dr Knox-Haly immediately went back to assist her colleague, but the offender again drove into the injured woman before fleeing the scene. Dr Knox-Haly attempted to call triple 0 but was unable to use her phone due to her head injury. When other shocked colleagues arrived she yelled for them to call an ambulance. Dr Knox-Haly sustained several injuries and was taken to hospital with her injured colleague. Despite their injuries both women survived the incident. By her actions, Dr Knox-Haly displayed conspicuous courage
Stephanie Leanne Bochorsky	28 March 2019	167		In the early morning of 28 August 2015, Senior Constable (then First Class Constable) Stephanie Bochorsky rescued two young children who had been covered with fuel and set alight at a house in Doubleview, Western Australia. At approximately 12:30am, Constable Bochorsky was off-duty and at home when she heard a female neighbour screaming in the street. She opened her door and saw a woman running and yelling that her children were being injured in a neighbouring house. Constable Bochorsky immediately left her own home and approached the property. As she entered the home, she smelt a strong odour of petrol. She made her way to a bedroom and on entering the room, found a naked man - the father of the children - armed with a fuel can and a cigarette lighter. He was in the process of pouring petrol onto a young girl who was lying on a bed. She then saw another small child standing in a cot. The upper part of the child was alight and she was in extreme pain. Despite the presence of the violent man, Constable Bochorsky grabbed a nearby blanket and began to extinguish the flames on the small child as the offender continued to pour petrol onto the young girl on the bed. Constable Bochorsky, without regard for her own safety, removed the young child from the cot and grabbed the girl from the bed and quickly left the house. She took the girls to her own home where she placed the youngest child in the bathtub and began to administer first aid to the child's burns. Meanwhile, another neighbour rushed into the offender's house armed with a fire extinguisher. The offender was now agitated and armed with a filleting knife with a 20 cm blade. Without warning, the offender lunged at the neighbour with the knife, attempting to stab him in the abdomen. The neighbour used the fire extinguisher to stop the attack. He disarmed and restrained the offender, while another neighbour entered the house and removed a third child from the scene. The children were all taken by ambulance to hospital and despite her severe burns, the small child continues to recover. By her actions, Senior Constable Bochorsky displayed conspicuous courage.
Shaun Michael McHenry	28 March 2019	168		On the morning of 12 October 2012, Mr Shaun McHenry displayed conspicuous courage during a fire burnover event at Black Cat Creek, Western Australia. The Black Cat Creek fire ignited around 9.00am and the firefighting effort was concentrated on two sectors. A change in wind direction to the south-west caused the fire to escalate dramatically and burn over the top of a group of firefighters, who were parked in the bush for a briefing. The fire intensified so quickly that two trucks were unable to escape and were completely gutted. A number of the firefighters sustained burns, two seriously. The strength of the fire was unusually high, due to the existence of heavy fuels in the area and very strong winds fanning the flames up a slight hill. Mr McHenry moved his truck between the approaching fire front and the utility vehicle of two colleagues, offering them protection from the heat and flames, which were now eight metres high. At this point, the engine of Mr McHenry's vehicle malfunctioned and he and another colleague became trapped in the ferocious burnover. A window of his truck blew out and the fire was sucked inside the vehicle. The cab started to melt and toxins from burning plastics and exploding cans filled the space. Knowing the immediate danger, Mr McHenry signalled to his colleague that they should seek refuge in another vehicle which appeared to be less impacted by the fire. With low visibility and very hot conditions, Mr McHenry led his colleague toward the other truck. The burning continued around them and they could hear the roar of the fire. They reached the other vehicle and as Mr McHenry opened the door, he discovered a distressed male inside. Unfortunately, this vehicle was also inoperable so he decided they needed to return to a safe area. Using a fire blanket for protection, Mr McHenry, his colleague, and the distressed male navigated through the smoke filled air. Suddenly, Mr McHenry felt something hit him in the back and push him over. His clothes caught fire and he used the fire blanket to extinguish himself. Headlights of another vehicle appeared and Mr McHenry and his two colleagues were then removed to the relative safety of the control point. By his actions, Mr McHenry displayed conspicuous courage.
Paul Robert Chaplin	31 March 2020	169		Mr Chaplin was visiting relatives when his cousin went to investigate a person seen entering a nearby farm shed. A short time later his cousin ran past him while being pursued by a man armed with two knives. On observing the offender pin his cousin to the ground and repeatedly assault him, Mr Chaplin quickly jumped a fence and ran towards the two men. He grabbed hold of the offender and pushed him off his cousin. With the offender chasing him, Mr Chaplin tripped and fell to his knees. He got to his feet before the armed offender lunged at him and they began to struggle. During the violent struggle, Mr Chaplin grabbed hold of the knife, but the offender pulled back before again lunging at him. Mr Chaplin blocked the assault with his forearm, causing the offender to lose his balance and fall over. As he fell, the offender struck Mr Chaplin in the hip with a knife. Both men then struggled on the ground until Mr Chaplin grabbed both of the offender's hands. At this point his injured cousin was able to remove one of the knives from the offender and hide it under a nearby bush. Mr Chaplin got to his feet and cautiously let go of the offender's hands and backed away until there was some distance between them. The offender then left the scene. Mr Chaplin quickly went to his nearby home to alert his family of the offender's presence in the area. Prior to assaulting Mr Chaplin and his cousin, the offender had fatally wounded a woman, and seriously injured a man, at the property.
Ruth Mawi Dhurrkay	26 August 2020	170		Miss Ruth Dhurrkay displayed conspicuous courage during a violent attack on a young girl at Galiwinku in the Northern Territory on 30 October 2018.
Tom Jackson	24 March 2021	171		The late Mr Tom Jackson, formerly of Congleton, England, displayed conspicuous courage during a knife attack at a hostel in Home Hill in Queensland on 23 August 2016. In the late evening of 23 August 2016 a man armed with a large knife dragged a young woman from her bed at the hostel and out onto a balcony. He held the knife to her throat and told other guests who had now gathered to leave the area. On hearing the commotion, the hostel manager appeared on the balcony and began to approach the armed offender. Another guest arrived and pleaded with the offender to drop the weapon. The offender inflicted a wound to the young woman and, after she fell to the floor, he continued to assault her with the knife. The hostel manager attempted to reach the injured woman but was wounded in the leg by the offender. The young woman got to her feet and ran down a corridor towards the safety of a bathroom. She was followed by another guest who had called 000. Without thinking of his own safety, Mr Jackson ran upstairs to the bathroom to assist the injured woman. After applying pressure to her substantial wounds, Mr Jackson and the other man began to move her from the cubicle and out of the bathroom. On opening the door to the bathroom, Mr Jackson was confronted by the armed offender. He attempted to close the door, but the offender kicked it open and entered the bathroom. The offender began to assault Mr Jackson with the knife, inflicting severe wounds. The other guest quickly left the bathroom, yelling for assistance. Police arrived at the scene and apprehended the offender. Paramedics also arrived and began treating Mr Jackson and the injured woman. Sadly, Mr Jackson and the young woman did not survive their injuries.
Laurie Nolan	24 March 2021	172		Mr Laurie Nolan, of Nelson Bay, displayed conspicuous courage during the rescue attempt of a race yacht in treacherous seas off the coast near Port Stephens on 6 January 2016. Mr Nolan was one of seven crewman on-board rescue vessel Port Stephens 40 who volunteered to go into cyclonic seas to aid a racing yacht that was encountering treacherous conditions near Port Stephens. After battling exceptionally rough seas and strong winds in pitch darkness for five hours they caught-up with the distressed yacht. At 2am, the 32-tonne rescue vessel was hit by a wall of water which tipped the boat onto its port side, throwing the crew on deck off their feet, and causing the boat's propellers to lift out of the water. As the boat righted itself a second large wave hit, engulfing Mr Nolan in water and knocking him off his feet. He regained his footing and worked to prevent crew members from being further entangled in safety lines and dragged under water. He then went to the aid of a crewman who had sustained a shoulder injury by untangling the safety line and moving the injured man off the deck and into the safety of the cabin. Realising another crewman was pinned to the deck by tangled lines, Mr Nolan grabbed a knife from his belt, severed the line, and pulled his colleague to his feet and inside the cabin. A third large wave then struck the boat, knocking it over and causing one of its engines to stop. As the boat righted itself, Mr Nolan and the battered crew were able to restart the engine, clear ropes away from the propellers, and then begin the arduous five-hour journey back to Port Stephens while battling large waves, cyclone-like headwinds, injuries and severe sea sickness. The crew of the race yacht later made it safely to shore in a life raft.
