= Darlot-Centenary Gold Mine =

Gold mine in Western Australia

Darlot-Centenary
- Location in Western Australia
- Interactive map of Darlot-Centenary

Location
- Location: Leinster, Western Australia, Australia; 27°53′S 121°16′E

Production
- Products: Gold
- Production: 102,574 ounces^{[1]}
- Financial year: 2022–23

History
- Opened: 1996

Owner
- Company: Red 5 Limited
- Website: www.red5limited.com
- Acquired: 2017

The Darlot-Centenary Gold Mine is a gold mine located 58 km east of Leinster, Western Australia.

It is operated by Red 5 Limited since the sale from Gold Fields Australia in 2017 where, since the beginning of 2008, it was part of Gold Fields Yilgarn South operation, which consisted of Darlot, the Lawlers Gold Mine and the Granny Smith Gold Mine. The mine is located in the Yandal Greenstone Belt.

== History ==
Gold mines in the Mid West region

Ore at Darlot-Centenary is mined in an underground operation at the Centenary deposit, discovered in 1996 next to the Darlot Gold Mine, which had a historical production in excess of 500,000 ounces. Homestake began mining the Centenary deposit in 1998.

The site, was originally owned by Sundowner Minerals, which was taken over by Forsayth group, then Plutonic Resources, a major Australian gold mining and exploration company. Homestake Mining Company purchased Plutonic in April 1998 for more than $1.0 billion, and, in turn, Homestake was acquired by Barrick Gold at the end of 2001.

In October 2013, Barrick finalised the sale of their Australian Yilgarn South mines, consisting of the Granny Smith, Lawlers and Darlot-Centenary mines, to Goldfields. Barrick sold the mines as it considered them high-cost and required cash to compensate for the rising cost of its Pascua-Lama gold project. The three mines accounted for six percent of Barrick's annual gold output at the time. Goldfields purchased the mines for US$300 million, half of which had to be paid in cash while the other half could be issued in shares.

In August 2017, Red 5 Limited purchased the Darlot mine from Gold Fields for A$18.5 million, A$12 million of this in cash and the remainder in shares. At the same time, the company also purchased the King of the Hills Gold Mine from Saracens Mineral Holdings for A$15.5 million in cash and shares.

With the completion of their new processing plant at the King of the Hills Gold Mine, Red 5 will close down the Darlot process plant in 2022 and instead process the ore from the mine's underground operations at the new facility.

== Production ==
Annual production of the mine:

=== Darlot ===
Production figures as a stand-alone operation:

Year	Production	Grade	Grade	Cost per ounce
2000	127,100 ounces		5.9 g/t	A$193
2001	125,000 ounces		5.7 g/t	A$325
2002	145,443 ounces			US$168
2003	154,977 ounces			US$164
2004	140,235 ounces			US$210
2005	135,000 ounces	0.164 oz/t	5.3 g/t	US$325
2006	137,000 ounces	0.170 oz/t	5.4 g/t	US$378
2007	120,000 ounces	0.156 oz/t	5.0 g/t	US$508

=== Yilgarn South ===
Production figures for the Yilgarn South operation, consisting of Darlot, Granny Smith and Lawlers:

Year	Production	Grade	Grade	Cost per ounce
2007	410,000 ounces	0.117 oz/ton	3.7 g/t	US$486
2008	325,000 ounces	0.125 oz/ton	4.0 g/t	US$749
2009	352,000 ounces			US$685
2010				
2011				
2012				
2013				

=== Darlot ===
Production figures as a stand-alone operation:

Year	Production	Grade	Cost per ounce
2014			
2015			
2016			
2017			
2017–18			
2018–19	70,081 ounces	4.43 g/t	
2019–20	63,921 ounces	3.46 g/t	
2020–21	76,104 ounces	2.63 g/t	
2021–22	57,362 ounces	2.0 g/t	
2022–23	102,574 ounces^{[1]}	1.53 g/t	A$1,837

=== Notes ===
- ^[1]Combined production figure for King of the Hills and Darlot
