= Prostanthera albiflora =

Scientific classification
- Kingdom: Plantae
- Clade: Tracheophytes
- Clade: Angiosperms
- Clade: Eudicots
- Clade: Asterids
- Order: Lamiales
- Family: Lamiaceae
- Genus: Prostanthera
- Species: P. albiflora

Binomial name
- Prostanthera albiflora B.J.Conn
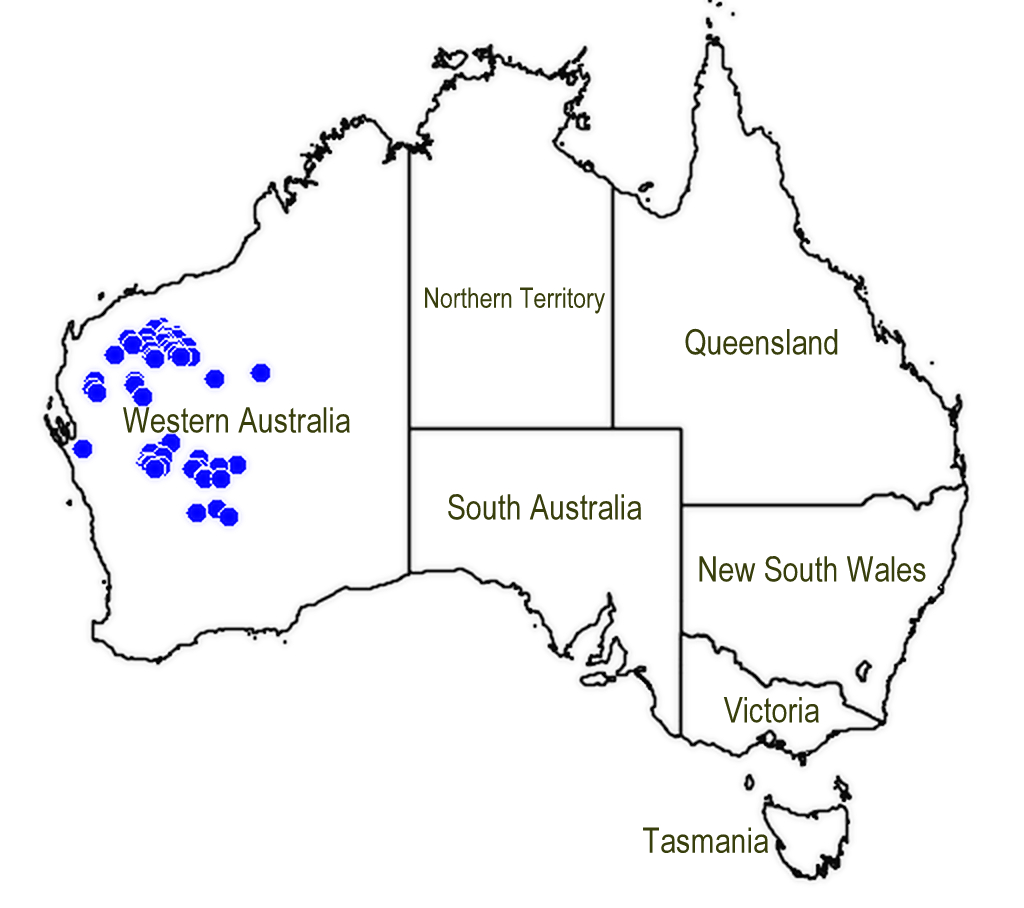

Species of flowering plant

Prostanthera albiflora is a species of flowering plant in the family Lamiaceae and is endemic to inland areas of Western Australia. It is an erect, spreading shrub with narrow egg-shaped to narrow elliptical leaves and two to twelve white flowers with pale blue spots inside and arranged in the upper leaf axils.

== Description ==
Prostanthera albiflora is an erect, spreading shrub that typically grows to a height of 0.5–2 m (1 ft 8 in – 6 ft 7 in) with stems that are square in cross-section. The leaves are usually narrow egg-shaped to narrow elliptical, light green, 5–18 mm (0.20–0.71 in) long and 3–6 mm (0.12–0.24 in) wide on a petiole 0.5–1.6 mm (0.020–0.063 in) long. The flowers are arranged singly in two to twelve of the upper leaf axils, each flower on a pedicel 1.6–3.1 mm (0.063–0.122 in) long. The sepals form a tube 3–5 mm (0.12–0.20 in) long with two lobes, the lower lobe 2.2–3.4 mm (0.087–0.134 in) long and the upper lobe 4.6–13 mm (0.18–0.51 in) long. The petals are white with pale blue spots inside and fused to form a tube 11–16 mm (0.43–0.63 in) long. The lower lip has three lobes, the centre lobe spatula-shaped, 6–7.2 mm (0.24–0.28 in) long and 6–9 mm (0.24–0.35 in) wide and the side lobes 5–6 mm (0.20–0.24 in) long and 4–5 mm (0.16–0.20 in) wide. The upper lip has two lobes 7.5–10 mm (0.30–0.39 in) long and about 13 mm (0.51 in) wide. Flowering occurs in April or from August to October.

== Taxonomy ==
Prostanthera albiflora was first formally described in 1988 by Barry Conn in the journal Nuytsia from specimens collected between Agnew and Wiluna in 1975.

== Distribution and habitat ==
This mintbush grows along watercourses in the Carnarvon, Gascoyne, Little Sandy Desert, Murchison, Pilbara and Yalgoo biogeographic regions of inland Western Australia.

== Conservation status ==
Prostanthera albiflora is classified as "not threatened" by the Western Australian Government Department of Parks and Wildlife.
