= St Ives Gold Mine =

Gold mine in Western Australia

St Ives
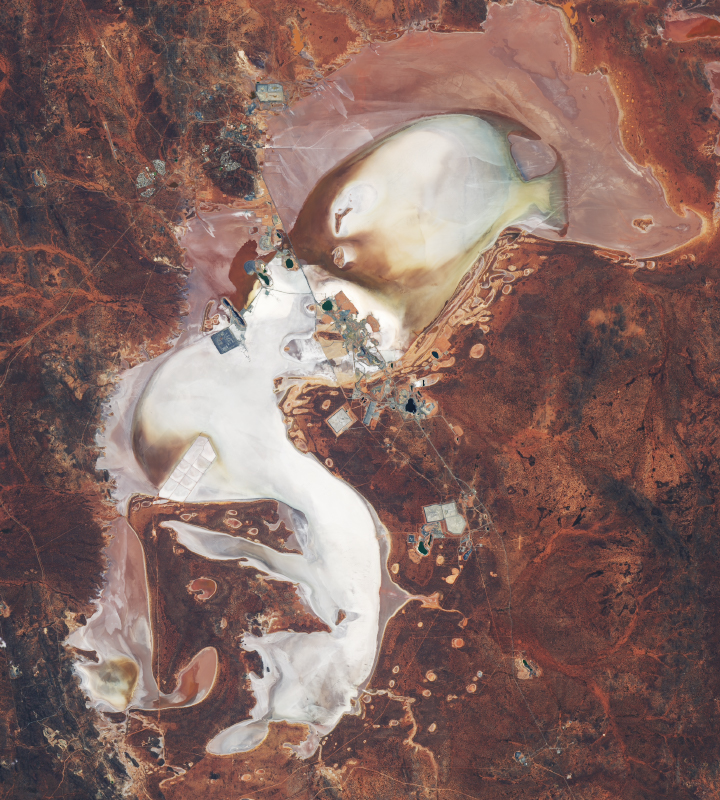
- Satellite image of Lake Lefroy, with the St Ives Gold Mine near the centre of the image, south of the lake

- Location in Western Australia
- Interactive map of St Ives
- Location: Kambalda, Western Australia, Australia; 31°19′14″S 121°44′25″E
- Products: Gold
- Production: 371,800
- Financial year: 2023
- Company: Gold Fields
- Website: www.goldfields.co.za
- Acquired: November 2001

The St Ives Gold Mine is a gold mine located 20 km south-east of Kambalda, Western Australia. It is owned by Gold Fields.

As of 2022, it is one of four mines the company operates in Australia, the others being the Agnew, Granny Smith and Gruyere.

Ore is mined at St Ives in three underground and four open-pit operations.

== History ==
Gold mines in the Kalgoorlie region

Gold mining in the area south of Lake Lefroy began as early as 1897 in small-scale operations but large-scale mining only began from 1920 onwards. In late 1919, prospector Pat Ives discovered gold further south from the original workings, with the gold mining district subsequently named after him.

A number of mines started operating in the area in the early 1920s, the largest of these being the Ives Reward Mine, which operated until 1926 and produced 7,115 ounces of gold throughout its operation. Including the Redhill Gold Mine at Kambalda, north of Lake Lefroy, the gold mining district produced 19,000 ounces of gold throughout this time.

WMC did some exploration in the area in 1937 but did not carry out any mining during this time, with the St Ives district seeing very little gold mining all up during the following decades. WMC returned to prospecting in the area in 1966, now in search of nickel. WMC subsequently developed the Kambalda Nickel Operations which, from 1974 onwards, also produced some gold from the nickel mine. A process plant for gold was eventually added at Kambalda in 1980. By mid-1980, gold exploration south of the lake, at the original St Ives mining location Victory, achieved good results. Consequently, a Carbon in pulp plant was constructed at Kambalda and commenced operations on 23 October 1981 to process ore from St Ives which was officially named the Kambalda Gold Operations.

The annual throughput of the process plant at Kambalda was expanded to 750,000 tonnes by 1982, with the gold produced at the mine offsetting WMC's declining profits from nickel caused by a drop in price for the commodity. The increasing size of the gold operation and the difficulty and cost of transporting the ore across the lake to Kambalda led WMC to the decision to construct a separate gold mining plant at St Ives, which was commissioned in May 1988 and eventually expanded to an annual throughput of three million tonnes.

In July 1992, the Kambalda Gold Operations were renamed to St Ives Gold Mines and, by December 1982, the WMC operation at St Ives had produced one million ounces of gold. A large number of ore bodies at St Ives have been named after ships present at the 1805 Battle of Trafalgar, with 13 orebodies named on the eastern side of the main road after British ships and four on the western side after Spanish and French ships.

The mine was purchased by Goldfields from WMC in late 2001. The combined price for the two Australian operations Goldfields purchased, St Ives and the Agnew Gold Mine, was US$180 million in cash and US$52 million in Gold Fields shares.

== Operation ==
From 2002, the mine was operated by Leighton Contractors. In 2012, Gold Fields brought operation of the mine in house.

St Ives employed 249 permanent staff and 926 contractors in 2009.

To reduce emissions and cost from its diesel generators, the mine builds a hybrid energy system with 35 MW of solar power and 42 MW of wind power.

== Production ==
Annual production of the mine:

Year	Production	Grade	Cost per ounce
2000	408,155 ounces	3.92 g/t	
2001	455,183 ounces	3.01 g/t	
2002	542,200 ounces	3.03 g/t	A$ 295
2002–03	513,000 ounces	2.9 g/t	A$323
2003–04	543,000 ounces	2.5 g/t	A$416
2004–05	527,000 ounces	2.6 g/t	A$447
2005–06	496,000 ounces	2.3 g/t	A$453
2006–07	487,000 ounces	2.2 g/t	A$540
2007–08	418,000 ounces	1.8 g/t	A$649
2008–09	428,300 ounces	1.8 g/t	A$805
2010			
2011			
2012			
2013			
2014		2.6 g/t	
2015	372,000 ounces	3.2 g/t	US$969
2016	363,000 ounces	3 g/t	US$949
2017	364,000 ounces	2.96 g/t	US$916
2018	367,000 ounces	2.88 g/t	US$902
2019	371,000 ounces		A$1,385
2020	385,000 ounces		A$1,266
2021	393,000 ounces	2.99 g/t	A$1,385
2022	377,000 ounces	3.04 g/t	A$1,594
2023	371,800 ounces	2.83 g/t	A$1,958
