= Gruyere Gold Mine =

Gold mine in Western Australia

Gruyere
- Location in Western Australia
- Interactive map of Gruyere
- Location: Laverton, Western Australia, Australia; 27°59′33″S 123°51′07″E
- Products: Gold
- Production: 322,000 ozt (10 t)
- Financial year: 2023
- Opened: 2019
- Company: Gold Fields
- Website: www.goldfields.co.za

The Gruyere Gold Mine is a gold mine located 159 km (99 mi) east-northeast of Laverton. As of October 2025, it is owned by Gold Fields, who acquired the mine and the former Australian gold mining company, Gold Road Resources.

As of 2022, it is one of four mines Gold Fields operates in Australia, the others being the Agnew Gold Mine, the Granny Smith Gold Mine and the St Ives Gold Mine. Mining at Gruyere is carried out in an open pit operation.

The mine is located on the traditional land of the Yilka people. Its location east of Cosmo Newbery, along the Great Central Road, is considerably further east then the majority of gold mines in the Goldfields–Esperance regions, with the Tropicana Gold Mine being the only active gold mine east of Gruyere in the region.

== History ==
The Gruyere deposit was discovered by Gold Road Resources in October 2013, 25 kilometres (16 mi) north-east of its previous exploration area in the Yamarna belt. Because of its remoteness and distance from the local mining centre, Kalgoorlie, the area had been historically poorly explored for resources.

In November 2016, Gold Road announced that it would sell 50 percent of the Gruyere project to Gold Fields for A$350 million in cash. Additionally, Gold Road would also receive a 1.5 percent net smelter return royalty on production above 2 million troy ounces (62 tonnes). Under this agreement, Gold Fields would manage the project while Gold Road would be responsible for exploration activities on the Gruyere tenements.

Mining at Gruyere is being carried out in an open pit operation, with a reported initial resource of 3.8 million troy ounces (120 t) of gold, later expanded to 6.51 million troy ounces (202 t), the latter at a grade of 1.33 grams per tonne (0.043 oz/short ton). In October 2021, it was announced that the depth of the pit was to be extended to 500 m (1,600 ft), which would make it one of the deepest open cut gold operations in Australia. The increased depth would extend the mine life of the open pit operations to 2032, with a proposed annual production of 350,000 troy ounces (11 t).

Construction of the Gruyere Gold Mine commenced in 2017 and was completed in 2019, at a cost of A$621 million and six years after the deposit's discovery. First gold was delivered in the June 2019 quarter. The official opening of the mine was on 3 December 2019. During the construction period, the mine employed 700 people, with the work force reduced to 250 for operations.

While Gruyere's relatively quick development from discovery to production, six years in comparison to the eight for the Tropicana Gold Mine, was hailed as a success, concerns were raised about the lack of new major gold deposit discoveries in Western Australia. Prior to Gruyere, Tropicana had been the last in 2005 and, at the time of the opening of Gruyere in 2019, no other large discovery had been made. This fact raised concerns in the state's gold industry about being able to maintain production rates.

As of 2022, it is one of four mines Gold Fields operates in Australia, the others being the Agnew Granny Smith and St Ives, with a combined production of 1,053,000 troy ounces (32.8 t) of gold in 2021.

In October 2025, Gruyere Holdings, a subsidiary of Gold Fields Limited, acquired Gold Road Resources through an Australian Scheme of Arrangement for A$3.7 Billion. With this, Gold Fields gained 100% of the shares of Gold Road and full ownership of Gruyere Gold Mine.

== Production ==
Annual production of the mine:

Year	Production (ozt)	Grade (g/t)	Cost per ounce (A$)
2019	99,000		4,170
2020	258,000		1,350
2021	247,000	0.91	1,541
2022	315,000	1.1	1,431
2023	322,000	1.07	1,792
2024	287,000	1.02	2,474
