= Loulo-Gounkoto =

Gold mines in Mali

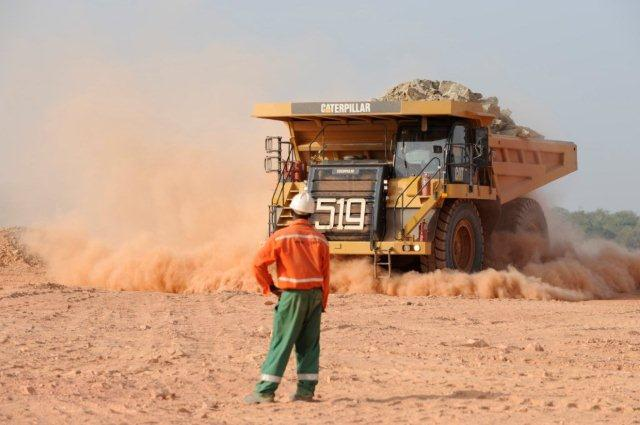
Loulo mine

The Loulo-Gounkoto Gold Mine is a mining complex in western Mali, near Senegal and on the Falémé River. Owned by Canadian company Barrick Mining, in 2025 there are legal proceedings about control.

Mali's government blocked gold exports. In 2025 it took control of the gold mines and seized gold from the complex.

Barrick closed the mine in January 2025 after Mali's government seized gold from it. The complex had produced 15 percent of Barrick's gold output. In November 2025, the government and Barrick announced an agreement to reopen the mine under Barrick.
