= Gregory Charles Wilkins =

Canadian business executive (1956–2009)

- Born: February 2, 1956
- Died: December 16, 2009 (aged 53); Toronto, Ontario, Canada
- Occupations: Businessman and accountant
- Title: President & CEO of Barrick Gold
- Spouse: Vera Wilkins
- Children: 2

Gregory Charles Wilkins (February 2, 1956 – December 16, 2009) was a Canadian businessman and chartered accountant.

== Career ==
Wilkins originally joined Barrick Gold Corporation in 1981, rising to the post of chief financial officer. He left in 1993 to become president and chief operating officer of Horsham Corp., a public company that was the controlling shareholder of Barrick at the time. Horsham Corp. later became TrizecHahn Corp. and Wilkins remained with the company until the planning of its conversion into a U.S. real estate investment trust had been completed and the company relocated to the United States.

Wilkins assumed the position of President of Barrick Gold Corporation, the world's largest gold producer, in 2003, when he replaced then President & CEO, Randall Oliphant. He was instrumental during his tenure at Barrick in the takeover of rival Placer Dome for some US $10 billion. Wilkins was a director of the company for twelve years.

== Personal life ==
Gregory Wilkins was an avid motor sports enthusiast. In 2004, along with his son Mark, they competed and placed 3rd in their class at the Rolex 24 Hours of Daytona at the Daytona International Speedway. The pair also traveled to Germany where they completed 5 laps at the Nürburgring race course.

Wilkins was diagnosed with brain cancer in March 2008. He returned to work at Barrick's headquarters assuming the position of Vice Chairman.

He died in Toronto, Ontario Canada on Dec 16, 2009 at the age of 53. He is survived by his wife Vera and two children, Mark and Lauren. Peter Munk, the founder of Barrick, is quoted as saying: "This is the loss of a dear friend who played a vital role in Barrick's growth. He worked alongside me building Barrick for almost thirty years. ... He was a leader who listened. He possessed an entrepreneurial spirit and an analytical mind. He produced results from considered decisions. Greg inspired confidence and respect in me, in our shareholders, in his colleagues, in everyone who met him."
