= Golden Sunlight mine =

Gold mine in Montana, United States

Coordinates: 45°54′20″N 112°1′22″W

The Golden Sunlight mine is an open pit gold mine in Jefferson County, Montana, 5 mi (8 km) northeast of Whitehall and 24 mi (39 km) east of Butte, Montana. The mine sits at an elevation of 6,000 ft (1,829 m) on the Bull Mountain range.

Owned and operated by Barrick Gold, the mine has been in operation since 1975, and in 2016 produced 34,000 ounces (964 kg) of gold. Measured and indicated resources at December 2015 were 691,000 oz (19,590 kg) at a gold grade of 1.46 grams per tonne.

Golden Sunlight is a conventional open-pit mine with a co-located ore treatment plant using carbon-in-pulp technology as well as sand tailings retreatment, where pyrite is gravity-separated from the cyclone underflow fraction, and reground and leached to recover gold that would otherwise be lost to tailings. In total mine operations employ approximately 150 people.
