= Barrick Mining =

Mining company

Barrick Mining Corporation
- Formerly: Barrick Resources Corporation (1983-1985); American Barrick Resources Corporation (1985-1995); Barrick Gold Corporation (1995-2025)
- Type: Public
- Traded as: NYSE: B; TSX: ABX; S&P/TSX 60 component
- Industry: Metals and mining
- Founded: 1983; 43 years ago
- Founder: Peter Munk
- Headquarters: Toronto, Ontario, Canada
- Key people: John L. Thornton; (Chairman); Mark Hill; (Interim CEO, COO)
- Products: Gold, copper
- Revenue: US$16.956 billion (2025)
- Operating income: US$9.032 billion (2025)
- Net income: US$7.154 billion (2025)
- Total assets: US$51.577 billion (2025)
- Total equity: US$35.916 billion (2025)
- Number of employees: (27,000 employees, 32,300 contractors)
- Website: www.barrick.com

Barrick Mining Corporation is a mining company that produces gold and copper. It has mining operations and projects in Argentina, Australia, Canada, Chile, Democratic Republic of the Congo, Dominican Republic, Ecuador, Egypt, Jamaica, Mali, Pakistan, Papua New Guinea, Peru, Saudi Arabia, Senegal, Tanzania, the United States and Zambia.

In 2025, it produced 3.26 million ounces of gold at all-in sustaining costs of $1,637/ounce and 220,000 tonnes of copper at all-in sustaining costs of $3.20/pound. As of 31 December 2025, the company had proven and probable reserves of 85 million ounces of gold and 18 million tonnes of copper. Barrick had been the world's largest gold mining company until Newmont acquired Goldcorp in 2019. Barrick expects to produce between 2.9 and 3.25 million ounces of gold and between 190,000 and 220,000 tonnes of copper in 2026.

Barrick plans to separate its business into two parts. American Barrick Gold Corporation will hold the company's North American gold assets: a 61.5% controlling interest in Nevada Gold Mines, a joint venture with Newmont that includes the Fourmile discovery, and a 60% controlling interest in the Pueblo Viejo mine in the Dominican Republic. These assets produced 2.0 million ounces of gold in 2025 on an attributable basis. On 10 November 2026, American Barrick filed a registration statement on Form S-1 with the U.S. Securities and Exchange Commission for an initial public offering of its common stock, and intends to apply to list on the New York Stock Exchange under the symbol ABGC. Barrick will retain a majority of the shares, making American Barrick a "controlled company" under NYSE rules. Barrick chief executive Mark Hill is to lead American Barrick. Barrick's remaining assets, including its operations in Africa, Latin America and Asia-Pacific, will stay with Barrick and, according to The Globe and Mail, will be led by Seb Bock as Barrick International.

The company has previously been known as Barrick Gold Corporation (1995-2025), American Barrick Resources Corporation (1985-1995) and Barrick Resources (1983-1985).

== History ==
=== Founding and early years ===
==== Barrick Resources ====
Barrick Gold Corporation evolved from a privately held North American oil and gas company, Barrick Resources. After suffering financial losses in oil and gas, founder Peter Munk (1927–2018) decided to refocus the company on gold. Barrick Resources Corporation became a publicly traded company on May 2, 1983, listing on the Toronto Stock Exchange.

=== 1986 to 2005 ===
==== Goldstrike ====
In the 1980s, Barrick Gold purchased Goldstrike, which was a rapid success making Barrick one of the biggest gold mining companies globally.

==== American Barrick ====
Reflecting its identity as a North American producer, distinct from its South African competitors, the company's name was changed to American Barrick Resources in 1986. It was listed on the New York Stock Exchange in February 1987. Its name was changed to Barrick Gold Corporation in 1995.

==== Barrick Gold Corporation ====
American Barrick became the third-largest gold mining company in the world when it acquired Lac Minerals in 1994, which owned mining properties in North and South America. Two years later, in 1996, Arequipa Resources, owner of properties including the Pierina mine in Peru, accepted a takeover offer from the renamed Barrick Gold Corporation. A third acquisition followed in early 1999, when Barrick Gold acquired Sutton Resources Ltd., assuming ownership of properties in Tanzania. In 2001, Barrick acquired Homestake Mining Company for $2.3 billion in stock, then one of the oldest mining companies in the United States. The purchase made Barrick the second-largest gold producer in the world.

=== Placer Dome acquisition ===
In December 2005, Barrick launched a hostile takeover bid valued at US$9.2 billion for rival Canadian gold miner Placer Dome. The $10.4 billion transaction closed in December 2006. The acquisition of Placer Dome by Barrick made Barrick the operator of the Granny Smith, Osborne, Porgera, South Deep, Bald Mountain, Cortez and Golden Sunlight mines.

=== 2006 to present ===
==== African Barrick Gold ====
In February 2010, Barrick Gold announced plans to create a separate company to hold its assets in Tanzania, called African Barrick Gold. Barrick Gold would retain majority ownership in the new company, after its listing on the London Stock Exchange (LSE). African Barrick Gold was listed on the London Stock Exchange in mid-March 2010, with an IPO valuation at US$3.6 billion. The shares offered on the LSE raised just more than 500 million pounds. In June the company was admitted to the FTSE 100 Index.

==== Equinox Minerals ====
In April 2011, Barrick beat a takeover offer for Equinox Minerals by China Minmetals.

==== Shandong Gold ====
In 2018, John L. Thornton orchestrated a strategic “trust-based relationship” between Barrick Gold and Shandong Gold Group, a Chinese state-owned enterprise, establishing joint ownership of the Veladero mine to capitalize on Shandong's investor base, capital suppliers, political connections, and regional influence. In the press release announcing the partnership, Thornton said that Barrick and Shandong were looking forward to “sharing...capital in ways that will create added value for our respective owners, and our government and community partners in San Juan province”.

==== Randgold Resources ====
In September 2018, Barrick Gold announced an all-stock merger with Randgold Resources in a deal valued at $6.5 billion. Immediately following the announcement of the merger, Randgold shares rose 6% and Barrick shares rose 5.6%. The deal created the world's largest gold producer with the new company listed on the Toronto Stock Exchange and New York Stock Exchange. The companies began talking about a combination in 2015 and the deal was orchestrated by Barrick Executive Chairman John L. Thornton and Randgold Founder and CEO Mark Bristow, who became CEO of the merged company.

==== Newmont ====
In February 2019, Barrick Gold announced a hostile $19 billion bid to acquire Newmont. It was estimated that a merger could create $7 billion of value in operational synergies and would result in a 14% rise in Newmont's net asset value per share. The deal would have created a gold mining company with a market value of about $42 billion that some said would be a long-overdue restructuring of the global gold industry. Merging gold companies could make the industry more attractive to general investors as gold reserves are shrinking across the globe so fewer competitors could boost growth prospects. Newmont rejected the takeover offer and instead suggested the two companies' operations in Nevada, USA, be merged with Newmont CEO Gary Goldberg insisting that the joint venture be operated by Newmont with the two companies dividing the ownership equally. A joint venture was subsequently announced in March 2019 with Barrick as the operator owning 61.5% of the business.

==== Nevada Gold Mines ====
On July 1, 2019, Barrick and Newmont launched Nevada Gold Mines. The combined operation is the single largest gold mining complex in the world and employs more than 7,000 people. It combined the mines Goldstrike, Cortez, Turquoise Ridge, and Goldrush from Barrick and Newmont's Carlin, Twin Creeks, Phoenix, Long Canyon sites, plus the associated processing plants and infrastructure of both companies. The joint venture was created after Barrick gave up a takeover bid for Newmont in early 2019.

Nevada Gold Mines in total comprises 10 underground and 12 opencast mines, two autoclave facilities, two roasting facilities, four oxide mills, a flotation plant and five heap leach facilities. Barrick owns 61.5% of the joint venture and operates the business, while Newmont owns 38.5%. It was estimated that $500 million could be saved by creating the joint venture in average annual synergies during the first five years of operating the joint venture. After its first year of operation, $35 million in operating and management costs were saved. Over 20 years, it is estimated that $4.7 billion of total savings will be realised.

==== Reko Diq Project ====
Pakistan plans to grant Barrick a mining lease, exploration license and surface rights to restart the Reko Diq copper-gold project, it was announced in March 2022. The project when in production has the potential to be one of the top five gold-copper mines in the world. It has the potential to produce 250,000 ounces of gold and 200,000 tons of copper every year for more than half a century and could be in production by 2027. It was estimated that the project site contains up to 42 million ounces of gold and 54 billion pounds of copper in a study done in 2010. The mineral deposit was discovered at the foot of an extinct volcano in the 2000s. Work on the project was stopped in 2011 when a mining license to develop the Reko Diq mine was refused to be granted by Pakistani authorities. Ownership of the mine is to be split evenly between Pakistan and Barrick, which are investing about $10 billion in the project, which is the single largest investment in the country. About 8,000 jobs are expected to be created and about $1 billion will be invested in a new mining technical school along with hospital, schools and roads in the province of Balochistan, which is poor and sparsely populated. Construction of the mine will take place in two phases beginning with a processing plant with the capacity of 40 million tonnes per year and doubling five years after being commissioned.

The federal government of Pakistan and provincial government of Balochistan have called the agreement with Barrick Gold to develop the Reko Diq copper-gold project the largest investment pact they have ever made. The agreement signed in December 2022 has the province of Baluchistan owning 10% of the project on a free carried basis, 15% on a fully funded basis, 25% by three state-owned enterprises, and 50% by Barrick Gold. Next steps to ramp-up the project include completing the updated feasibility study by the end of 2024 with first production of gold and copper to occur in 2028.

==== Corporate Strategy and Name Change (2025) ====
In May 2025, Barrick Gold Corporation officially changed its name to Barrick Mining Corporation (French: Société minière Barrick), following shareholder approval at its Annual and Special Meeting on May 6, 2025. The rebranding reflects Barrick’s evolution from a gold-focused company to a diversified mining enterprise with a growing copper portfolio. The company stated that its vision is to become “the world’s most valued gold and copper exploration, development and mining company.”

The name change took effect on May 9, 2025, when Barrick’s common shares began trading under the new name on the New York Stock Exchange (NYSE) and the Toronto Stock Exchange (TSX). The NYSE ticker symbol was changed from GOLD to B, while the TSX symbol ABX remained unchanged. A new CUSIP number (06849F108) was also assigned.

This strategic rebranding aligns with Barrick’s broader business model, which now includes significant copper operations alongside its six Tier One gold mines. Key projects supporting this dual-commodity approach include the Pueblo Viejo expansion, the Fourmile gold project in Nevada, and the Reko Diq copper-gold project in Pakistan. Barrick views copper as critical for the global energy transition, complementing gold’s role as a store of value.

==== Leadership and Governance Changes (2025) ====
In September 2025, Barrick Mining Corporation announced a major leadership transition following the sudden departure of President and Chief Executive Officer Mark Bristow, who had led the company since its merger with Randgold Resources in 2019. Bristow’s tenure was marked by the successful integration of Randgold, significant portfolio optimization, and a reduction of net debt by ~$4 billion.

The Board appointed Mark Hill, a veteran executive with nearly 20 years at Barrick, as Group Chief Operating Officer and Interim President & CEO while initiating a global search for a permanent successor. Hill previously oversaw Barrick’s Latin America and Asia-Pacific operations and played a key role in strategic projects such as the Fourmile gold discovery in Nevada.

In November 2025, Barrick announced significant governance changes at the Board level. Ben van Beurden, former CEO of Shell and Lead Independent Director since August, resigned after seven months on the Board. Loreto Silva, a Non-Executive Director and former Chilean Minister of Public Works, was appointed as the new Lead Independent Director.

The leadership overhaul also extended to senior management amid pressure from activist investor Elliott Investment Management. Barrick reorganized its operating structure and announced executive departures, including Kevin Thomson (Head of Corporate Development), Christine Keener (COO for North America), and Kevin Annett (CFO for North America). Their roles were filled by George Joannou, Tim Cribb, and Wessel Hamman, respectively.

==== Initial Public Offering Evaluation (2025) ====
On December 1, 2025, Barrick announced that its board had authorized management to evaluate an initial public offering (IPO) of a new subsidiary to hold its premier North American gold assets. The proposed entity, referred to as “NewCo,” would include Barrick’s interests in Nevada Gold Mines (a joint venture with Newmont Corporation), the Pueblo Viejo mine in the Dominican Republic, and its wholly owned Fourmile discovery in Nevada. Barrick stated that only a minority stake would be offered, while it would retain a controlling interest.

The move comes amid record gold prices and investor pressure to unlock value by separating assets in stable jurisdictions from those in higher-risk regions such as Africa and Pakistan. Analysts estimate the North American assets could be worth between US$56 billion and US$62 billion, producing over 2 million ounces annually. Barrick shares rose about 4.6% following the announcement, contributing to a year-to-date gain of more than 160% amid a strong gold rally. The company expects to provide an update on the IPO evaluation in February 2026, alongside its full-year results.

==== Activist Investor Pressure (2025) ====
In late 2025, Barrick Mining Corporation came under significant pressure from activist investor Elliott Management Corporation, which disclosed a stake estimated at between US$700 million and US$1 billion, placing it among Barrick’s ten largest shareholders. Elliott, known for its aggressive campaigns in the mining sector, began advocating for a major corporate restructuring to unlock value, including a potential split of Barrick into two separate publicly traded entities: one focused on its lower-risk North American assets and another holding operations in Africa, Asia, and other higher-risk jurisdictions.

== Separation of North American business ==
In 2026, Barrick announced plans for an initial public offering of its North American gold business, as part of a strategic overhaul led by chairman John Thornton. In August 2026, Barrick and Newmont signed an agreement modernizing the Nevada Gold Mines joint venture, under which Barrick contributed Fourmile and Newmont contributed the Mike and Fiberline properties.

On 10 November 2026, American Barrick filed a registration statement on Form S-1 for the offering. Under the separation, Barrick will complete an internal reorganization so that American Barrick owns the Nevada Gold Mines and Pueblo Viejo interests and certain other North American assets and liabilities, while Barrick's other assets and liabilities remain with Barrick. Immediately before the offering, American Barrick will issue Barrick a promissory note as a dividend, and it intends to use part of the net proceeds to repay the note and the remainder for general corporate purposes. Barrick has said it expects to return the proceeds it receives to its shareholders. The number of shares and the price range had not been set at the time of filing. Goldman Sachs, BofA Securities, Citigroup and RBC Capital Markets are the lead underwriters.

American Barrick is incorporated in Delaware and intends to redomicile to Nevada before the offering; its principal executive offices are in Henderson, Nevada. The filing lists a New York Stock Exchange listing only. Barrick had said in April 2026 that it expected a secondary listing in Toronto, but the filing does not mention one.

Barrick will have the right to designate a majority of American Barrick's board and committees for as long as it owns a majority of the shares, but will not have decision-making authority over day-to-day management. Mark Hill is to be chief executive; J. Brett Harvey, a Barrick director, is to be chairman of a seven-member board; Wessel Hamman is to be chief financial officer; and Tim Cribb is to be chief operating officer.

American Barrick expects to pay a base dividend of US$1.25 billion a year, in quarterly installments, with special dividends from additional free cash flow subject to board discretion. Under a relationship agreement with Barrick, the dividend policy cannot be amended without Barrick's written consent while Barrick owns at least 35% of the shares. On a carve-out basis, the North American business reported 2025 revenue of US$11.40 billion and net earnings attributable to owners of US$2.24 billion.

Hill said the listing was expected by the end of 2026, though it could slip into early 2027. Bloomberg reported that the plan faced opposition from several of Barrick's largest shareholders over concerns about separating some of its most valuable assets.

== Berkshire Hathaway ==
Berkshire Hathaway disclosed that it purchased $562 million in shares of Barrick during the second quarter of 2020, immediately making it the eleventh-largest shareholder in the company. The new position is 20.9 million shares, which is 1.2% of the company's outstanding stock. Berkshire CEO Warren Buffett and his business partner Charlie Munger have a history of dismissing gold as an attractive investment, saying a fine business run by good managers with cash flows and paying dividends is more productive than the precious metal. Buffett has previously said owning shares of quality companies is more valuable than owning gold itself. Buffett later sold his entire stake in the company in 2021.

In April 2025, Barrick Gold announced it was considering rebranding itself Barrick Mining.

== Operations ==
=== Gold ===
Property	Country	Ownership	Mine Type	2025 Gold Production (ounces)	2024 Gold Production (ounces)	2024 Gold Reserves (ounces)
Veladero	Argentina	50%	Open Pit	190,000 – 220,000	252,000	1.6 million
Pueblo Viejo	Dominican Republic	60%	Open Pit	370,000 – 410,000	352,000	12 million
Loulo-Gounkoto	Mali	80%	Open Pit, Underground		578,000	7.3 million
Kibali	Democratic Republic of Congo	45%	Open Pit, Underground	310,000 – 340,000	309,000	4.6 million
Porgera	Papua New Guinea	47.5%	Open Pit, Underground	70,000 - 95,000	46,000	1.5 million
North Mara	Tanzania	100%	Open Pit, Underground	230,000 – 260,000	265,000	2.9 million
Bulyanhulu	Tanzania	100%	Underground	150,000 – 180,000	168,000	3.8 million
Nevada Gold Mines	United States	61.5%	Open Pit, Underground	1.54 – 1.7 million	1.65 million	26.6 million

=== Copper ===
Property	Country	Ownership	Mine Type	2025 Copper Production (tonnes)	2024 Copper Production (tonnes)	2024 Copper Reserves (tonnes)
Zaldívar	Chile	50%	Open Pit	40,000 – 45,000	40,000	0.75 million
Jabal Sayid	Saudi Arabia	50%	Underground	25,000 – 35,000	32,000	0.28 million
Lumwana	Zambia	100%	Open Pit	125,000 – 155,000	123,000	8.3 million

=== Former operations ===
Asset	Country
Kalgoorlie Super Pit	Australia
Plutonic Gold Mine	Australia
Cowal, New South Wales	Australia
Darlot-Centenary Gold Mine	Australia
Hemlo	Canada
El Indio	Chile
Tongon	Ivory Coast
Pierina, Ancash	Peru
Tulawaka	Tanzania
Buzwagi	Tanzania
Bald Mountain mine	United States
Round Mountain Gold Mine (50%)	United States
Ruby Hill	United States

== Mining practices ==
=== Mali Mining Code Dispute (2023-2025) ===
In November 2025, Barrick Mining Corporation resolved a two-year dispute with the Government of Mali over the Loulo-Gounkoto gold mine, one of Africa’s largest gold operations. The conflict began in 2023 when Mali introduced a revised mining code that increased royalty rates, raised taxes, and expanded state participation in mining projects. Barrick initially resisted adopting the new code, prompting the Malian government to seize gold shipments, impose a provisional administration on the mine, and detain four Barrick employees.

Under the settlement, Barrick agreed to pay approximately 244 billion CFA francs (US$430 million), including 144 billion CFA francs within six days of signing and additional amounts through VAT-credit offsets. In return, Mali dropped all charges against Barrick and its affiliates, released the detained employees, and restored operational control of Loulo-Gounkoto to the company. Barrick also withdrew its arbitration case at the International Centre for Settlement of Investment Disputes (ICSID) and agreed to operate under Mali’s 2023 mining code.

The Loulo-Gounkoto complex, which produced 723,000 ounces of gold in 2024, is 80% owned by Barrick and 20% by the Malian state. Analysts estimate the mine could generate up to US$1.5 billion in operating cash flow annually once production resumes, though full ramp-up may take six to twelve months. The resolution highlights growing Resource nationalism in West Africa, where governments seek greater revenue from mining amid record-high Gold prices.

=== Voluntary Principles on Security and Human Rights (2010) ===
In 2010, Barrick Gold Corporation became the 18th company to join the Voluntary Principles on Security and Human Rights which provides "guidance to extractives companies on maintaining the security of their operations in a manner that respects human rights and fundamental freedoms." Admission follows an eight step process that requires approval by the Voluntary Principles plenary, the main decision-making body, consisting of all active members, drawn from participating governments, companies and non-governmental organizations. Barrick Gold participates in a number of corporate social responsibility programs, such as the United Nations Global Compact. The company is a signatory to the Extractive Industries Transparency Initiative. It also participates in The Global Reporting Initiative, Business for Social Responsibility and The Global Business Coalition on HIV/Aids, Tuberculosis and Malaria. On September 7, 2007, Barrick was added to the Dow Jones Sustainability Index. The company is a member of The International Leadership Council (ILC) of The Nature Conservancy. In Papua New Guinea, the Porgera Joint Venture participated in the development of a wildlife conservation area in the Kaijende Highlands.

=== Argentina ===
==== Environment (2015-2017) ====
Between 2015 and 2017, three separate incidents occurred where processing solution containing cyanide escaped the leach pad area. In September 2015, 1,072m^{3} of cyanide processing solution was released from a faulty valve on a pipe going to the heap leach pad and was not diverted to the tailings storage facility because of a malfunctioning gate. In September 2016, a pipe carrying cyanide processing solution was struck by falling ice that had rolled down a slope, and in March 2017, a pipe carrying a mixture of rocks came loose. After the first accident in 2015, local judge Pablo Oritja of Argentina indicted nine employees, and a fine of $9.8 million was levied. Authorities in San Juan province responded with plans to re-engineer some operational and environmental processes at the mine, which were audited by local and international experts. The National Observer obtained court documents with allegations from a former employee that his employment was terminated soon after concerns were raised about health and safety and environmental practices in 2014.

==== Class Action Lawsuit (2016) ====
A U.S. class-action lawsuit was launched in 2016 accusing the company of fraudulently inflating its market value by concealing problems at Pascua Lama, a South American mine under development. Development of the mine was indefinitely halted on October 31, 2013, and people who purchased shares between May 7, 2009, and November 1, 2013, were part of the class-action lawsuit. Development was halted for a number of issues including cost overruns, environmental concerns and the falling price of gold that would have made the operation less economical. A $140 million settlement was reached two months later with no charges of wrongdoing or liability and the company stating the claims alleged by the lead plaintiffs are unfounded.

=== Canada ===
==== Talonbooks (2010) ====
In February 2010, lawyers for Barrick Gold threatened to sue the Canadian publisher Talonbooks for defamation if it proceeded with plans to publish the book Imperial Canada Inc.: Legal Haven of Choice for the World's Mining Industries by Alain Deneault. Publisher Karl Siegler described this as "libel chill," pointing out that since the book had not yet been published, Barrick Gold could not know whether or not its contents actually constituted defamation. Subsequently, Talon decided to publish the work (ISBN 9780889226357) and "issued a statement saying they 'intend to show the complete manuscript to Barrick prior to the book's release, to allow Barrick the opportunity to "correct" any "falsehoods" about how they conduct their business affairs, worldwide, that they feel it may contain.'"

==== Noir Canada (2010) ====
A 2011 decision in Quebec Superior Court had ruled that Barrick Gold had to pay $143,000 to authors Alain Deneault, Delphine Abadie, William Sacher, and publisher Les Éditions Écosociété Inc to prepare their defense in a "seemingly abusive" strategic lawsuit against public participation. Despite the Québec ruling, a book "Noir Canada" documenting the relationship between Canadian mining corporations, armed conflict, and political actors in Africa was never published as part of a settlement which, according to the authors, was only made for the sole purpose of resolving the three-and-a-half-year legal battle.

==== Environmental violations (2025) ====
In March 2025, Barrick Gold was fined $114,750 for dumping liquid waste with cobalt concentrations up to 7,011% above legal limits into Hedley Creek, which flows into the Similkameen River in British Colombia. The violations occurred on 17 occasions between September 2021 and October 2023, with average concentrations of 1,155% above permitted levels.

=== Papua New Guinea - Porgera Gold Mine ===
==== Human rights abuses (2011) ====
In 2011, Human Rights Watch, a New York City-based international non-governmental organization that conducts research on human rights, found a pattern of abuses perpetrated by private and public law-enforcement personnel in 2009 and 2010 in the Porgera Gold Mine in Papua New Guinea. Human Rights Watch says that violent insecurity is a “chronic problem” around Porgera due to people engaging in illegal mining and continuously raiding various areas of the mining property including the open pit, stockpile areas for rock, waste dumps, and underground tunnels. Human Rights Watch said the government of Papua New Guinea has “consistently failed” to maintain law and order in the area and that responsible government regulation was the one essential component still lacking to manage the unstable social situation in the area. On the same day Human Rights Watch published its report, the company said it had been working with Human Rights Watch for six months on a series of actions in response to the investigation, which included improvements to the security environment, enhanced human rights training, and grievance mechanisms. A “remedy framework” called the Porgera Remedy Framework was set up as an alternative to the local judicial system to deliver compensation packages. In June 2014, Amnesty International reported that local police forced evictions by way of arson from land adjacent to the mine. The report said that community leaders presumed the alleged actions by the police were an effort to prevent illegal mining. Journalist Richard Poplak visited the area around the mine in 2016 and reported that Papua New Guinea could be the most dangerous country in the world to be female and that law and order in the country is lacking. He reported that rumours of sexual violence in the Porgera Valley began in 2005 and by 2011 there were hundreds of allegations. Several victims received compensation through a remediation program that was set up in 2012 but was later criticized as other victims who took legal action instead of participating in the remediation program received higher compensation after reportedly settling out of court for a sum that was higher than offered in the remediation program.

==== Ownership ====
Soon after the Human Rights Watch 2011 publication, the mine, which was owned jointly by Barrick, Zijin Mining of China, and local landowners through Mineral Resources Enga, was nationalized by the government of Papua New Guinea under Prime Minister James Marape when the government did not renew the mining lease, and it expired in August 2019. The gold mine, which contributes about 10% of Papua New Guinea's total exports, was seen by Prime Minister James Marape as a way for the country to get a greater share of its major natural resource projects. Two new deals forged in 2021 gave the Papua New Guinea government a majority stake in the operations of the Porgera gold mine and an agreement reached in 2023 renewed the special mining lease so that operations could restart that year.

==== Environmental concerns ====
At the Porgera Joint Venture in Papua New Guinea, the material that remains after extracting gold from ore is processed into tailings and sent off the mining property. Critics say the tailings disposal method could release harmful materials in a way that would not be allowed under the water quality expectations of a developed country. The Porgera Joint Venture is one of three large mines that dispose of tailings in this way in the country.

=== Peru ===
In February 2021, Barrick Gold announced it would sell its Lagunas Norte mine in Peru. The mine is sold to Boroo Pte Ltd. for up to US$81 million.

==== Water (2012) ====
The BBC reported in September 2012 that one person was killed and at least four more were injured at the Barrick Pierina mine in the northern Ancash region of Peru in clashes between national police and members of a neighboring community who were protesting the mine's alleged over-consumption and contamination of local water sources during a drought. Villagers from the communities of Mareniyoc and San Isidro blocked an access road to the mine and entered the property by forcing open the mine gate. Community members asked that the mine provide the communities with drinking water. Operations at the mine resumed after two days.

=== United States ===
==== Cortez Hills (2009-2010) ====
Through 2009 and into 2010, Barrick Gold's Cortez Hills project was the subject of litigation in Nevada, seeking to block the project. Opponents appealed to the United States Court of Appeals for the Ninth Circuit, challenging a ruling in the United States District Court for the District of Nevada, which denied the bid to block the project. The Appeals Court "upheld a federal judge's finding that opponents of the mine failed to prove they were likely to prevail on claims the mine would cause visual harm to Mount Tenabo and create a substantial burden on the tribe's ability to exercise their religion" but ruled the U.S. Bureau of Land Management's previous environmental review of water and air pollution impacts "was inadequate under the National Environmental Policy Act" and ordered the District Court to provide "appropriate" injunctive relief while the Bureau of Land Management conducted further study. In March 2011 the Bureau of Land Management approved a subsequent study on environmental impacts, allowing the mine to operate as originally proposed.

==== Western Shoshone (2008) ====
In 2008, the company negotiated an agreement with four of five regional Western Shoshone tribes, providing financial resources for education and wellness initiatives, including a long-term scholarship program, allocated at the Tribe's discretion. A former tribal chairman of the Duck Valley Shoshone spoke of the company as "a pretty progressive entity." In British Columbia the Tahltan Nation has thanked the company for encouraging local sustainable development while operating the Eskay Creek mine from 2001 to 2008.

== See also ==
- Gregory Charles Wilkins
- Porgera Gold Mine
- Pueblo Viejo mine
- Veladero mine
