= Akyem mine =

Gold mine in Eastern, Ghana

- Location within Ghana
- Location: New Abirem, Eastern Region, Ghana; 6°21′25″N 1°00′58″W
- Products: Gold
- Company: Zijin Mining

Akyem mine is an open-pit gold mine near New Abirem in the Eastern Region of Ghana. It is owned by Zijin Mining. The mine was developed in 2005, with commercial production beginning in 2013.

The mine has resulted in environmental conflict in which farmers displaced by the mine complain that they were not fairly compensated for their lands; their protests have been violently suppressed. An international jury of NGOs criticised Newmont by awarding the company the Public Eye on Davos award for shameful violation of environmental and ethical principles in its mining activities in Ghana.

== Background ==
Newmont owns two gold mines in Ghana, the other being Ahafo mine in the Ashanti Region. Ahafo mine has created some environmental degradation and conflict, including a fish kill in 2012.

Akyem mine is located in the Ajenjua Bepo Forest Reserve, which has generated concerns about ecological damage.

The region has a long history of small-scale artisanal mining.

== Description and production ==
Newmont applied for permits from the Environmental Protection Agency in Ghana in July 2002. Development began in 2005.

The mine is an open pit 2.65 kilometre long and 900 meters wide with a depth of 465 m. Estimated reserves are 7.7 million ounces of gold.

Newmont announced commercial production beginning in 2013. Newmont had invested $1.1 billion in the mine by 2013. and expected production of 450,000 ounces of gold from 2013 to 2018.

In 2024, Newmont sold the mine to Zijin Mining for up to $1 billion in cash.

== Conflict ==
Since 2005, local farmers displaced by the mine have complained that they were not adequately compensated.

In November 2005, two people were killed when farmers seeking compensation for their lands were shot at. A coalition of communities and NGOs condemned this violence and said it was part of a pattern of systematic violence by industry and state agencies against frontline mining communities in Ghana.

In 2018, seven farmers who were protesting the mine were injured when police fired on them with rubber bullets. Newmont representatives maintained that farmers were fairly compensated for their lands.

Newmont was criticised by a jury of NGOs who awarded the company the Public Eye on Davos award for shameful violation of ethical and environmental principles. The jury said that the company "destroyed unique natural habitats, carried out forced resettlement of local people and polluted soil and rivers."
