= Veladero mine =

Gold mine in Argentina

Coordinates: 29.4092°S 69.8950°W

- Interactive map of Veladero mine
- Location: San Juan Province, Argentina
- Products: Gold
- Company: Barrick Mining

The Veladero mine is a gold mine in Argentina. The mine is located in the north-western part of Argentina in San Juan Province. The mine has estimated reserves of 10 million oz of gold. It is operated by Barrick Mining.The mine uses heap leach to extract gold and silver, which is a process that uses cyanide to dissolve the gold and mercury to extract it from the cyanide slurry. This mine has had at least 5 catastrophic spills into the environment contaminating 5 rivers.

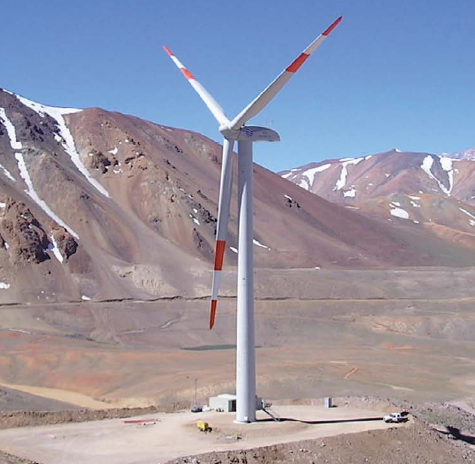
DeWind D8.2 HE 2MW wind turbine at the Veladero mine.

In 2007, Barrick Gold installed the world's highest-altitude wind turbine at the Veladero mine at nearly 4,200m elevation.

== See also ==
- El Indio Gold Belt
- Gold mining in Chile
