= Star Africa Commodities & Minerals Limited =

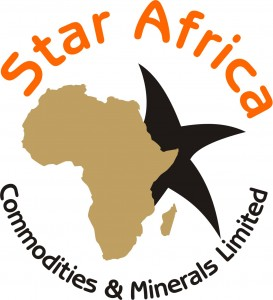
- Trade name: Star Africa
- Industry: Oil and Gas, Equity Holdings: Mining and Agriculture
- Founded: April 24, 2009
- Headquarters: Ghana
- Services: Upstream Exploration Services, Technical Consultancy, Oil Exploration and Gas Exploration, Oil Production and Gas Production, Refining, Mining and Mineral Dealing and Exploration
- Website: www.star-af.com

Star Africa Commodities & Minerals Limited also just known as Star Africa, is an indigenous Ghanaian company involved primarily in Oil and Gas.

== History ==
Star Africa Commodities & Minerals Limited is a fully integrated company founded in 2009 in the Republic of Ghana, initially formed for the purpose of acquiring interests in mineral and hydrocarbon deposits throughout Africa. Based on a carefully executed strategy, Star Africa is leveraging regional assets and contacts to secure viable agricultural, Industrial minerals Mining and Oil and Gas revenue producing assets, along with providing associated products and services. Star Africa's activities cover three main sectors: Gold mining, Industrial minerals Mining, Agriculture and Oil and Gas.
