= Agnew, Western Australia =

Agnew
- Town
- Coordinates: 28°00′43″S 120°31′08″E
- Country: Australia
- State: Western Australia
- LGA: Shire of Leonora
- Location: 982 km (610 mi) north east of Perth; 21 km (13 mi) south west of Leinster; 160 km (99 mi) south of Wiluna
- Established: 1936

Government
  - State electorate: Kalgoorlie
  - Federal division: O'Connor
- Elevation: 519 m (1,703 ft)
- Postcode: 6435

Agnew is a ghost town in the Goldfields-Esperance region of Western Australia 982 kilometres (610 mi) north-east of Perth; the closest populated town is Leinster.

The town is named after a miner, John Alexander Agnew, who worked for a local mining firm, Bewick, Moreing & Co. The townsite was declared in 1936. It had no official post office in 1936; an unofficial one operated two days per week offering limited service.

The town's post office was robbed in 1937, with over £250 being stolen during the course of the night. The post office was part of the Emu mine premises and it was noted that the safe from which the money was stolen was found locked afterward.

At one point the town had a population of 500. The Agnew Hotel, was built in 1945 amongst a row of shops on the main street and was all that was left of the town until its demolition in 2018. An old head frame of a stamp mill and the large tailing dumps of the East Murchison United gold mine also remain just outside the town.

In 1947, two prospectors, Charles Farranda and Alberto Bernardi, discovered a new gold find north of the Emu mine. The quartz reef containing coarse gold returned about 10 oz per ton and was described as the best find in the district for years.

The town water supply failed in the same year when, following six days of calm weather, the windmill was unable to pump water from the town bore and most of the town's tanks had run dry. The town's population at the time was about 200 including 33 children. Water had been pumped by windmill from a well about 90 feet (27 m) deep and then pumped to a raised 5,000 imperial gallons (22,730 L) tank, then gravity fed back down to the town. Following the failure the residents refused to pay their rates to the Goldfields Water Supply Department.

The Emu mine closed in 1948; ore breaking stopped late in January and employees received a one-month notice of dismissal. The mine closed as a result of the high cost of production and the inability to secure capital for development work. Over 80 men were employed at the mine at the time.

In 1949, the Agnew gold mine closed. This was closely followed by the closure of the town's school as the number of enrolments dropped from 30 to 5. The population of the town fell from 150 to 25.

The Emu mine was severely flooded in 1989 resulting in the death of six men who were working underground at the time.

An operating gold mine is located adjacent to the townsite and is also named Agnew. The mine is owned by Gold Fields Ltd.

In early 2012, three miners were seriously injured when part of the mine collapsed. The men were working underground when mesh used to reinforce a rock wall gave way. Two suffered spinal injuries and the Royal Flying Doctor Service sent two planes to transfer the men to hospitals in Perth.
