= Granny Smith Gold Mine =

Gold mine in Western Australia

Granny Smith
- Location in Western Australia
- Interactive map of Granny Smith
- Location: Laverton, Western Australia, Australia; 28°48′38″S 122°24′52″E
- Products: Gold
- Production: 283,900
- Financial year: 2023
- Company: Gold Fields
- Website: www.goldfields.co.za
- Acquired: 2013

The Granny Smith Gold Mine is a gold mine 21 km (13 mi) south of Laverton, Western Australia near Mount Weld and operated by Gold Fields.

As of 2022, it is one of four mines the company operates in Australia, the others being the Agnew, Gruyera and St Ives.

== History ==
Gold mines in the Leonora region

The Granny Smith gold deposit was discovered in 1979 by Canadian prospector Ray Lovi Smith and named after his wife Laurende.

Construction of the mine took place in the late 1980s.

The project was originally owned by Delta Gold, which became Auriongold in February 2002. Aurion was taken over by Placer Dome in 2003, who already held a 60% interest in the mine, and Placer Dome in turn by Barrick Gold in March 2006.

A large amount of ore processed at Granny Smith originated from the Wallaby deposit, approximately 10 km (6.2 mi) west of the mine, and was hauled to the Granny Smith mill for processing. Open pit mining at Wallaby ceased in September 2006, followed by a ramp up of underground mining at the location.

In February 2009, Barrick signed a memorandum of understanding with Crescent Gold to purchase ore from its Laverton Gold Mine and mill it at Granny Smith. In January 2010, an agreement was signed with Range River Gold to purchase ore from the Mount Morgans Gold Mine and treat it at Granny Smith from February 2010 onwards.

In October 2013, Barrick finalised the sale of their Australian Yilgarn South mines, consisting of the Granny Smith, Lawlers and Darlot mines to Gold Fields. Barrick sold the mines as it considered them high-cost and required cash to compensate for the rising cost of its Pascua-Lama gold project. The three mines accounted for six percent of Barrick's annual gold output at the time. Goldfields purchased the mines for US$300 million, half of which had to be paid in cash while the other half could be issued in shares.

== Environment ==
In 1999, abandoned mining pits at Granny Smith were used for trials on breeding silver perch and barramundi in salty water.

== Production ==
=== Granny Smith ===
Production of the mine as an individual entity:

Year	Production	Grade	Cost per ounce
1996	312,262 ounces		
1997	376,386 ounces		
1998	604,806 ounces		
1999	523,092 ounces	4.52 g/t	A$161
2000	412,049 ounces	3.94 g/t	A$340
2001	347,179 ounces	3.28 g/t	A$338
2002	358,648 ounces		
2003	307,341 ounces		
2004	293,228 ounces		
2005	278,806 ounces		
2006	314,000 ounces	0.108 oz/t	US$401
2007	175,000 ounces	0.056 oz/t	US$651

=== Yilgarn South ===
Production figures for the Yilgarn South operation, consisting of Darlot, Granny Smith and Lawlers:

Year	Production	Grade	Cost per ounce
2007	410,000 ounces	0.117 oz/ton	US$486
2008	325,000 ounces	0.125 oz/ton	US$749
2009	352,000 ounces		US$685
2010			
2011			
2012			
2013			

=== Granny Smith ===
Production of the mine as an individual operation again:

Year	Production	Grade	Cost per ounce
2014		7.17 g/t	
2015	301,000 ounces	6.97 g/t	US$764
2016	284,000 ounces	6.62 g/t	US$834
2017	290,000 ounces	5.54 g/t	US$896
2018	280,000 ounces	5.26 g/t	US$925
2019	275,000 ounces		A$1,325
2020	265,000 ounces		A$1,415
2021	279,000 ounces	5.23 g/t	A$1,545
2022	288,000 ounces	5.66 g/t	A$1,691
2023	283,900 ounces	5.0 g/t	A$1,800
