= South Deep mine =

Gold mine in Gauteng, South Africa

- Location in South Africa
- Location: Gauteng, South Africa; 26°25′S 27°40′E
- Products: Gold
- Company: Gold Fields

The South Deep mine is one of the largest gold mines in the South Africa and in the world. The mine is located in the north-east of the country in Gauteng. The mine has estimated reserves of 81.4 million oz of gold.

== Environment, social and corporate governance ==
South Deep Mine has experienced a challenging period over recent years with various steps taken to revise its cost base in order to reduce losses (of approximately US$292m over a five-year period). In August 2019 a material restructuring of the mine was announced with the primary aim being to reduce costs by way of cutting 1,100 employees and 460 contractors.

In response to the retrenchment announcements, the National Union of Mineworkers branch at South Deep started strike action. The strike lasted for 45 days from 2 November 2018 and was ended following a settlement agreement between Gold Fields and the National Union of Mineworkers.
