= Agnew Gold Mine =

Gold mine in Western Australia

Agnew
- Location in Western Australia
- Interactive map of Agnew
- Location: Agnew, Western Australia, Australia; 28°00′26″S 120°30′28″E
- Products: Gold
- Production: 244,900 ounces
- Financial year: 2023
- Company: Gold Fields
- Website: www.goldfields.co.za
- Acquired: November 2001

The Agnew Gold Mine, formerly the EMU Mine, is a gold mine located 3 km (1.9 mi) west of Agnew, Western Australia. It is owned by Gold Fields. As of 2022, it is one of four mines the company operates in Australia, the others being the Granny Smith, Gruyere and St Ives.

Ore is mined at Agnew in the under ground Waroonga complex and the open pit Songvang operation.

== History ==
Gold mines in the Mid West region

Gold mining at Agnew commenced in the early 1900s, with mining being carried out by East Murchison United, EMU, which gave the mine its original name, the EMU mine, as well as a company owned by Claude de Bernales.

WMC acquired the mining tenements in the early 1980s, opening an open cut mine and process plant there in 1986, near the town of Agnew. At this point the town, which had once had a population in the thousands, just consisted of a run-down hotel, the near-by newly established mining town of Leinster serving the Leinster Nickel Mine. When WMC acquired the Leinster mine in 1989 and renamed it Leinster Nickel Operations, the gold mine at Agnew became the Leinster Gold Operations, with both operations sharing a number of facilities.

In 1990, underground mining at Agnew commenced. In 1994, WMC restructured its organisation and separated the gold and nickel operations, with the gold mine becoming the Agnew Gold Operation. A second gold mine in the area, the Lawlers Gold Mine, was operated by Barrick Gold, until purchased by Gold Fields in October 2013.

On 13 June 1989 the mine, then called the EMU mine, was the scene of one of the worst mining disasters in Western Australia when six workers drowned in the underground operations during a flood.

The mine was purchased by Gold Fields from WMC in late 2001. The combined price for the two Australian operations Gold Fields purchased, St Ives and Agnew, was US$180 million in cash and $52 million in Gold Fields shares.

Agnew, in 2009, employed 114 permanent staff and 298 contractors.

A 4 MW solar farm was added in 2019, along with a 17 MW wind farm and a 13MW/4MWh battery, supplying half the mine's power needs.

== Production ==
Annual production of the mine:

Year	Production	Grade	Cost per ounce
2000	209,598 ounces	6.27 g/t	
2001	185,400 ounces	6.08 g/t	
Jan to June 2002	66,200 ounces	3.56 g/t	A$436
2002–03	144,000 ounces	3.5 g/t	A$437
2003–04	202,000 ounces	5.3 g/t	A$317
2004–05	212,500 ounces	5.6 g/t	A$315
2005–06	222,000 ounces	5.2 g/t	A$370
2006–07	212,000 ounces	5.0 g/t	A$380
2007–08	204,000 ounces	4.8 g/t	A$496
2008–09	192,100 ounces	5.6 g/t	A$541
2009–10			
2010–11			
2011–12			
2012–13			
2014		7.1 g/t	
2015	237,000 ounces	6.4 g/t	US$959
2016	229,000 ounces	6.5 g/t	US$971
2017	241,000 ounces	6.5 g/t	US$977
2018	238,000 ounces	6.49 g/t	US$1,026
2019	219,000 ounces	5.7 g/t	A$1,656
2020	233,000 ounces	5.8 g/t	A$1,528
2021	223,000 ounces	5.53 g/t	A$1,741
2022	239,000 ounces	6.21 g/t	A$1,875
2023	244,900 ounces	5.67 g/t	A$1,939
