= Ahafo mine =

Gold mine in Ghana

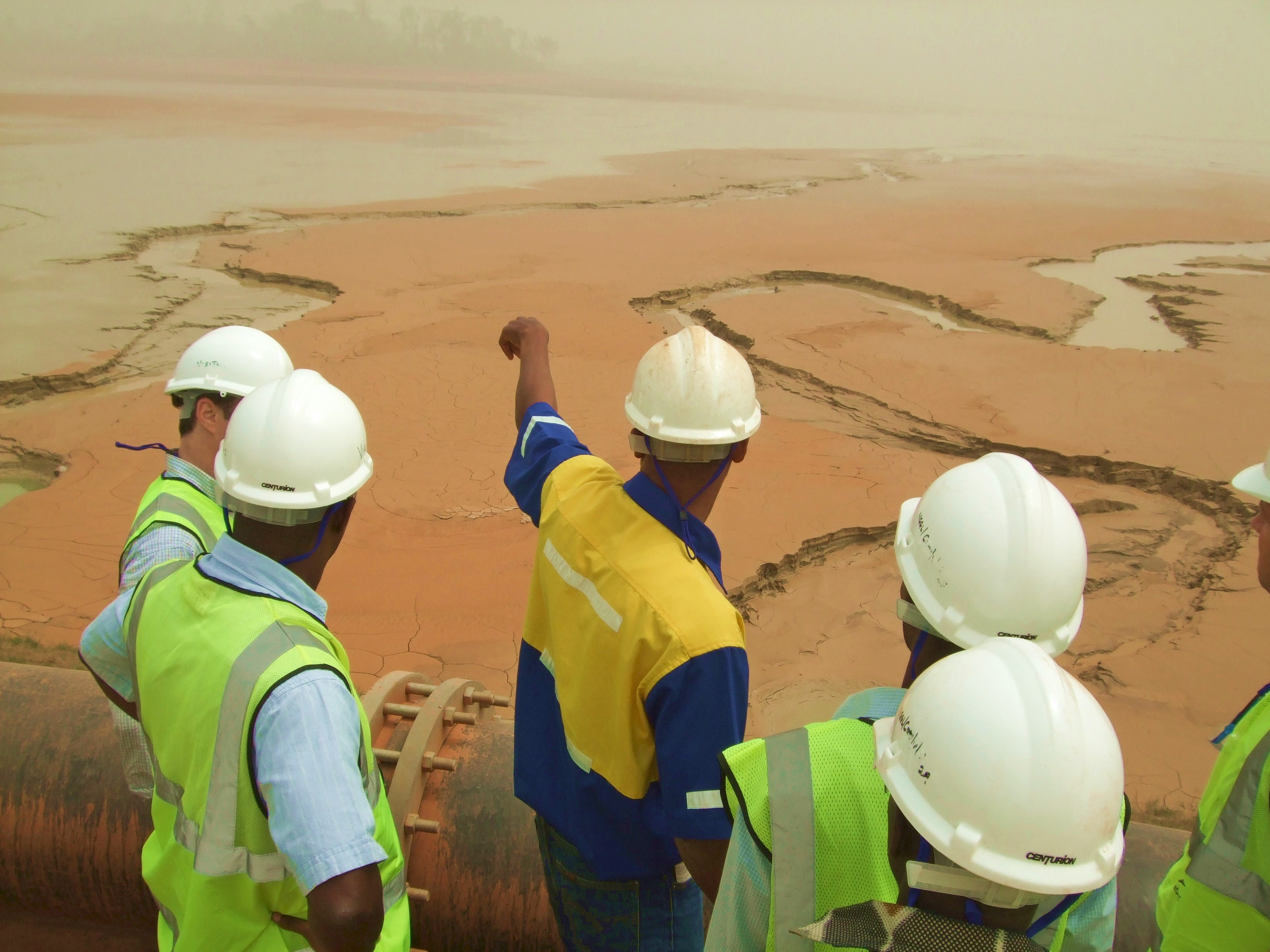
- Ahafo Gold Mine open pit gold mine
- Interactive map of Ahafo mine
- Location: Brong-Ahafo Region, Ghana; 7.012475°N 2.356042°W
- Products: Gold
- Company: Star Africa Commodities & Minerals Limited, Newmont Goldcorp

The Ahafo mine is one of the largest gold mines in the Republic of Ghana and in the world. The mine is located in the center of the country in Brong-Ahafo Region. The mine has estimated reserves of 17 million ounces of gold.

The company has been accused of "human rights abuses and irresponsible practices" by Earthworks, an environmental organization, and others.

== Pollution and social impact ==
In October 2008, an instrument malfunction caused a spill of sodium cyanide, and the Ghanaian EPA determined that the company had violated its permits. The company was fined $4.9 million and the government agency determined that Newmont failed to appropriately report or investigate the spill.

The cyanide spill caused a large fish kill. Newmont initially denied responsibility for the fish kill, stating that the deaths were due to over-population of the fish and depleted oxygen in the water. An independent investigation found high levels of cyanide in the fish, and that cyanide levels in the water were 1,400% higher than the World Health Organisation standard. The water also contained levels of cadmium and arsenic that far exceeded WHO safety standards.

Earthworks reports that the mine displaced about 9,500 people who were mostly subsistence farmers.
