= Tarkwa mine =

Gold mine in Tarkwa, Western Region, Ghana

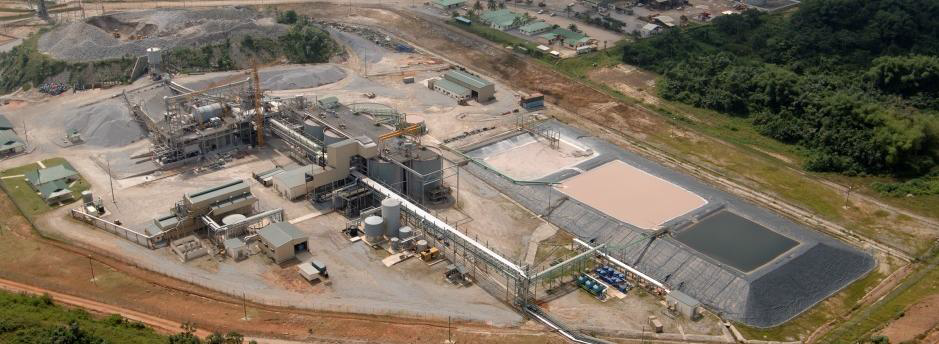
- Processing facilities of the Tarkwa Mine.

- Location within Ghana
- Location: Tarkwa, Western Region, Ghana; 5°19′6.22″N 2°0′48.88″W
- Products: Gold
- Company: Gold Fields

The Tarkwa mine is one of the largest gold mines in Ghana and in the world. The mine is located in the south-west of the country in the Western Region. The mine has estimated reserves of 15.1 million oz of gold.

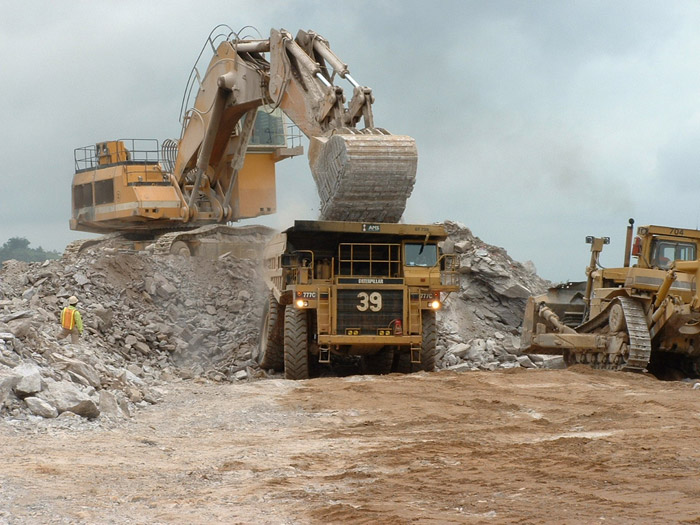
Mining operations

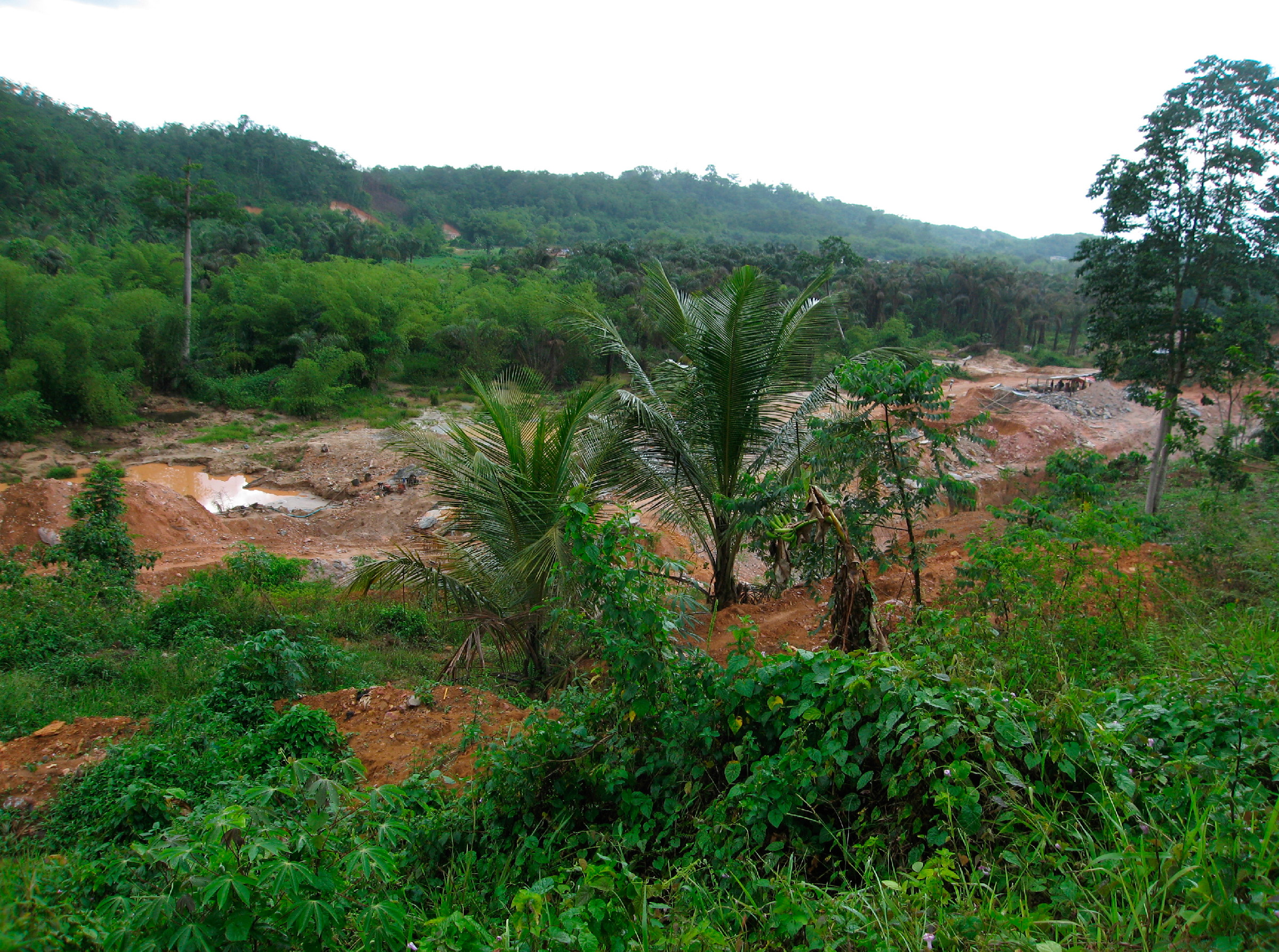
Land disturbances at the Tarkwa mine

== Environmental, Social & Corporate Governance ==
In October 2001 a tailings dam ruptured at the company's Tarkwa Gold Mine in Ghana, resulting in thousands of cubic metres of mine waste water spilling into the Asuman River and resulting in the death of significant marine life. While acknowledging the cyanide spill, the company stated at the time that the spill did not affect human health or safety.

A further incident occurred in 2003 when water from an abandoned underground mine shaft was identified as having seeped into the Asuman River, sparking further fears of contamination.

In July 2012 the mine was directed by the Ghana Environmental Protection Agency to halt a gold-recovery plant because water discharged from the site required additional treatment.
