= Damang mine =

Gold mine in Southern Ghana

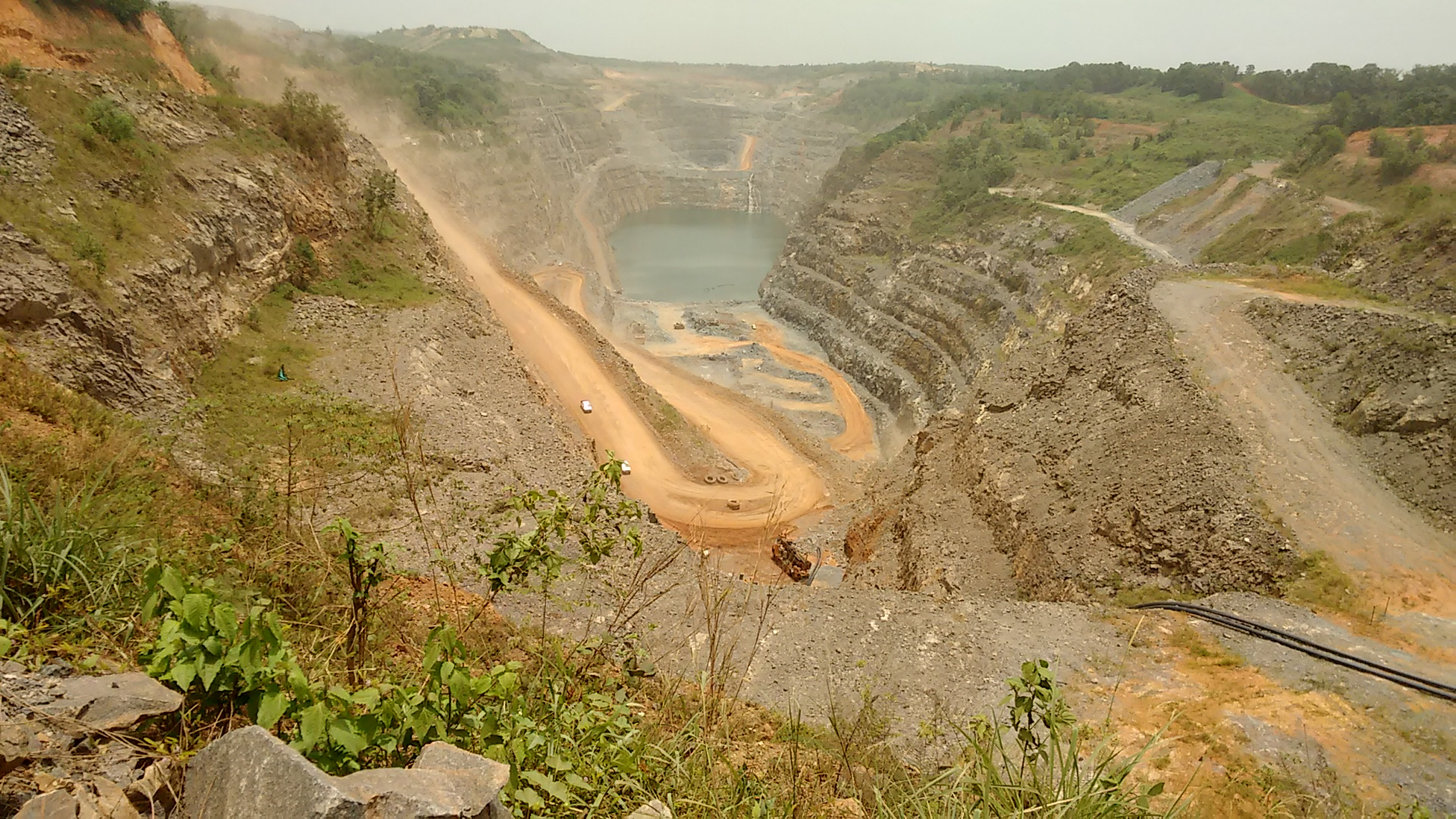

- Location within Ghana

Location
- Location: Damang, Western Region, Ghana; 05°30′36.6″N 001°50′39.6″W

Production
- Products: Gold

Owner
- Company: Gold Fields

The Damang mine is one of the largest gold mines in Ghana and in the world. The mine is located in the south-west of the country in the Western Region. The mine has estimated reserves of 10 million oz of gold. The mine is operated by Abosso Goldfields Ltd., a subsidiary of the South African Gold Fields, which was acquired by the South African company in 2002.

On 7th April,2026, the lease of the mine was approved to be handed to Ibrahim Mahama's company, Engineers and Planners Limited. The Damang Mine sold its initial gold output to Ghana GoldBod and the Bank of Ghana to bolster national reserves.

The Damang Gold Mine delivered 100 percent of its gold production to the Ghana GoldBod. Ghana is working to increase its Gold reserves and build it's currency. The Damang Gold Mines therefore delivered 121 kilograms of gold to the Board. This is the second delivery the mine is making to the GoldBod since it took over the operation of the Damang mines.

== See also ==
- Geology of Ghana
- Birimian
