= Gold Fields =

South African mining company

Gold Fields Limited
- Type: Public
- Traded as: JSE: GFI; NYSE: GFI (ADR)
- Industry: Gold mining
- Founded: 1887; 139 years ago (as Gold Fields of South Africa); 1998; 28 years ago (merger with Gencor)
- Headquarters: Johannesburg, South Africa
- Number of locations: South Africa (one mine), Ghana (two mines), Australia (four mines), Peru (one mine), Canada (one project), Chile (one mine)
- Key people: Yunus Suleman (chairperson); Mike Fraser (CEO); Alex Dall (Interim CFO)
- Products: Gold
- Revenue: $ 4.286 billion (FY 2022)
- Net income: $ 721.7 million (FY 2022)
- Number of employees: 17,611 (FY 2018)
- Website: www.goldfields.com

Gold Fields Limited (formerly The Gold Fields of South Africa) is one of the world's largest gold mining firms. Headquartered in Johannesburg, South Africa, the company is listed on both the Johannesburg Stock Exchange (JSE) and the New York Stock Exchange (NYSE). The firm was formed in 1998 with the amalgamation of the gold assets of Gold Fields of South Africa Limited and Gencor Limited. The company traces its roots back to 1887, when Cecil Rhodes founded Gold Fields of South Africa Limited. As of 2019, Gold Fields was the world's eighth-largest producer of gold.

The company owns and operates mines in Australia, Chile, Ghana, Peru and South Africa, with one 50:50 JV project in Canada. Growth efforts are focused mainly on the regions where it currently operates and are mainly driven through brownfields exploration on its existing land positions and through mergers and acquisitions in the same regions.

== Board of directors ==
- Chairperson – Yunus Suleman

=== Executive directors ===
- Chief executive officer (CEO) – Mike Fraser
- Chief financial officer (Interim CFO) – Alex Dall

== Operations ==
=== Australia ===
- Agnew
- St Ives
- Granny Smith
- Gruyere (a joint venture with Gold Road Resources)

=== Ghana ===
- Tarkwa
- Damang

=== Peru ===
- Cerro Corona

=== South Africa ===
- South Deep

In 2012, Gold Fields Limited unbundled its subsidiary, GFI Mining South Africa Proprietary Limited, which was then renamed Sibanye Gold Limited, and consisted of the KDC (formerly Kloof) and Beatrix mines, as well as an array of support service entities in South Africa. The three mines transferred from Gold Fields to Sibanye, later Sibanye-Stillwater, were:

- Beatrix gold mine
- KDC mine (formerly Kloof)
- Driefontein mine

=== Chile ===
- Salares Norte

=== Canada ===
- Windfall project

In october 2024, Gold Fields announced that it has entered into a definitive agreement with Osisko Mining to acquire all the common shares of Osisko Mining on the Toronto Stock Exchange (TSX). This transaction, was approved by Osisko Mining shareholders, and give Gold Fields full control of the Windfall Project in Québec, Canada, that was previously jointly and equally owned and managed by Gold Fields and Osisko Mining since May 2023.

== Environment ==
In October 2001 a tailings dam ruptured at the company's Tarkwa Gold Mine in Ghana resulting in thousands of cubic metres of mine waste water spilling into the Asuman River and resulting in the death of significant marine life. While acknowledging the cyanide spill the company stated at the time that the spill did not affect human health or safety.

A further incident occurred in 2003 when water from an abandoned underground mine shaft, again at the company's Tarkwa Gold Mine, was identified as having seeped into the Asuman River sparking further fears of contamination.

In July 2012 the company was directed by the Ghana Environmental Protection Agency to halt a gold-recovery plant at the Tarkwa Gold Mine because water discharged from the site required additional treatment.

== Bibliography ==
- Gold Fields: A Centenary Portrait by Paul Johnson. Many black and white, colour plates of personnel and topography. Includes an image of Guy Carleton Jones, and refers to Consolidated Gold Fields and its subsidiary companies.
