= List of gold mines in Tanzania =

This is a list of gold mines in Tanzania. It includes all working, former and future mines that produce gold as a primary or by-product. It is organized in alphabetic order.

== B ==
- Bulyanhulu Gold Mine
- Buzwagi Gold Mine

== G ==
- Geita Gold Mine
- Golden Pride Gold Mine

== H ==
- Handeni mine

== K ==
- Kirondatal Gold Mine

== M ==
- Mbangala Gold Mine

== N ==
- New Luika Gold Mine
- North Mara Gold Mine
- Nyanzaga mine

== Sogwe ==
- Sekenke Gold Mine

== T ==
- Tulawaka Gold Mine
