= Mineral industry of Africa =

The second-largest mineral industry in the world is the mineral industry of Africa. Africa is the second largest continent with 30.37 million square kilometres of land, implying a large quantity of resources. With a population of 1.4 billion, mineral exploration and production constitute significant parts of their economies for many African countries and remain keys to economic growth. These economies commonly utilize exploitative measures on the African people to maximize resource extraction for the benefit of foreign investment.

Africa is richly endowed with mineral reserves and ranks first in quantity of world reserves for bauxite, cobalt, industrial diamond, phosphate rock, platinum-group metals (PGM), vermiculite, and zirconium. Foreign powers have encroached on African land for centuries. Their colonization of Africa was driven by its exploitation of resources and soon mineral mining. Although now independent countries, external powers continue to mine the lands with African laborers against their will. African people and nations receive little to no benefit from the mineral extraction to support the consumption of Global North Nations.

The Central African Mining and Exploration Company (CAMEC), one of Africa's primary mining enterprises, has faced criticisms for its unregulated environmental impact and minimal social stewardship. In the spring of 2009, retired British cricket player Phil Edmonds's assets were seized by the United Kingdom's government due to CAMEC's illicit association with former self-appointed Zimbabwean President Robert Mugabe. CAMEC underwent restructuring and sold 95.4% of its shares to the Eurasian Natural Resources Corporation. Consequently, it no longer operates under the CAMEC brand.

African mineral reserves hold a significant position globally ranking first or second for bauxite, cobalt, diamonds, phosphate rocks, platinum-group metals (PGM), vermiculite and zirconium. Many other minerals are also abundant in quantity. In 2012, the African soil contributed to the world's production of minerals as follows: bauxite 7%; aluminium 5%; chromite 38%; cobalt 60%; copper 9%; gold 20%; iron ore 2%; steel 1%; lead (Pb) 2%; manganese 38%; zinc 1%; cement 4%; natural diamond 56%; graphite 2%; phosphate rock 21%; coal 4%; mineral fuels (including coal) – 13% and petroleum 8%; uranium 18%; and platinum 69.4%.

== Key producers ==
As of 2005, strategic minerals and key producers were:

Material	Percent of world production	Countries	Ref
Diamond	73%	Botswana 35%; Congo (Kinshasa) 34%; South Africa 17%; Angola, 8%	
Gold	89%	South Africa 56%; Ghana, 13%; Tanzania, 10%; and Mali, 8%	
Uranium	16%	Namibia 46%; Niger 44%; South Africa less than 10%	
Bauxite (for aluminium)	9%	Guinea 95%; Ghana 5%	
Steel	2%	South Africa 54%; Egypt 32%; Libya 7%; Algeria 6%	
Aluminium	5%	South Africa 48%; Mozambique 32%; Egypt 14%	
Copper (mine/refined)	5%/	Zambia 65%/77%; South Africa 15%/19%; Congo (Kinshasa) 13%/0%; Egypt 0%/3%	
Platinum/Palladium	92%	South Africa 97%/96%	
Coal	5%	South Africa 99%	

Estimates for the production of major mineral commodities for 2005 and beyond have been based upon supply-side assumptions, such as announced plans for increased production, new capacity construction, and bankable feasibility studies. The outlook sections were based on projected trends affecting 2005 producing facilities and planned new facilities that operating companies, consortia, or governments have projected to come online within indicated timeframes. Forward-looking information, which includes estimates of future production, exploration and mine development, cost of capital projects, and timing of the start of operations, is subject to various risks and uncertainties that could cause actual events or results to differ significantly from expected outcomes.

== Historical Context ==
Early colonizers of Africa started as European conquests and soon to modern colonization that suppressed communal autonomy, disrupted local customary practices and irreversible transformations of Africa’s socioeconomic systems due to their exploitation and extraction of natural resources.

In the early 15th century, Portugal was the first to establish trade routes along the Africa coast. Later in the century, Spain established colonies in North Africa and the Canary Islands. France began to colonize West and North Africa in the 17th century. Great Britain expanded influence in the 18th and 19th century, colonizing Eastern and Southern Africa. Belgium, notorious for its exploitation of the Congo, colonized in the late 19th century. Germany established colonies in Southwest Africa and East Africa near the end of the 19th century.

There was remarkable levels of development in Africa before European incursion but, according to academic journalist Oluka, “most of African ancestral heritages were destroyed by colonial imperial powers while other legacies were replaced” leading to the consequence of "imperialist exploitation of the resources of the ‘new states’”.

Before colonization, African peoples mined using techniques such as “...alluvial mining, panning, shallow and deep pit mining, underground mining, and underwater sand dredging… Modified versions of these ancient mining techniques and practices are still used by artisanal miners in modern Africa”. The colonial nations also enacted “Land Ordinances” to claim African land creating the pathway for them to claim mining as a “public purpose”. According to law and policy scholar Evaristus Oshionebo, this entitled the colonizing nations land and enacted laws that “...compelled native Africans to work for foreign miners in deplorable conditions. In addition, colonial governments subjected Africans to a poll tax which, in times of labour shortage, was arbitrarily increased simply to force Africans from their villages to seek work in the very poor conditions of the mines”.

According to authors Kamara & Bumba, “An estimated 40,000 children are involved in cobalt mining in the DRC, some as young as seven years old, working in unsafe conditions”. In these informal and hazardous mining environments, children work long hours for less than $2 per day. They perform dangerous tasks such as digging tunnels, carrying heavy loads, and cleaning cobalt ores with their bare hands and no protective equipment. Poverty and systemic inequalities are the primary drivers of child labour in cobalt mines. Over 73% of the DRC’s population lives below the international poverty line.

== Economics ==
=== Organizations promoting exports ===
The mineral industry is a significantly important source of export earnings for many African nations. To promote exports, groups of African countries have formed numerous trade blocs, which included the Common Market for Eastern and Southern Africa, the Economic and Monetary Community of Central Africa, the Economic Community of Central African States, the Economic Community of West African States, the Mano River Union, the Southern African Development Community, and the West African Economic and Monetary Union. Algeria, Libya, and Nigeria were members of the Organization of the Petroleum Exporting Countries (OPEC). The African Union was formally launched as a successor to the Organization of African Unity in 2002 to accelerate socioeconomic integration and promote peace, security, and stability on the continent.

=== Dependence of African countries ===
Many African countries are dependent on mineral exports. Mineral fuels are carbon-based exports such as coal and petroleum that are essential to economic function for all global powers. Coal is a solid fossil formed from ancient plant matter, primarily used for electricity generation and steel production. Petroleum is a liquid fossil fuel from ancient marine organisms used for fuel, lubricants, and as a raw material for various chemicals. Coal has a higher carbon content, whereas petroleum has a higher energy density per unit volume. Coal is extracted through mining, while petroleum must be extracted through drilling wells. Both have significant contributions to greenhouse gas emissions and environmental degradation. Mining has caused soil and water pollution and deforestation, which also leads to biodiversity and habitat destruction.

Both of these mineral fuels account for more than 90% of the export earnings for Algeria, Equatorial Guinea, Libya, and Nigeria. Minerals account for 80% for Botswana (led by, in order of value, diamond, copper, nickel, soda ash, and gold), Congo (Brazzaville) (petroleum), Congo (Kinshasa) (diamond, petroleum, cobalt, and copper), Gabon (petroleum and manganese), Guinea (bauxite, alumina, gold, and diamond), Sierra Leone (diamond), and Sudan (petroleum and gold). Minerals and mineral fuels accounted for more than 50% of the export earnings of Mali (gold), Mauritania (iron ore), Mozambique (aluminium), Namibia (diamond, uranium, gold, and zinc), and Zambia (copper and cobalt).

The mineral industry's exports make up an important part of the African gross income. Ongoing mining projects of more than US$1 billion are taking place in South Africa (PGM 69%; gold:31%), Guinea (bauxite and aluminium), Madagascar (nickel), Mozambique (coal), Congo (Kinshasa) and Zambia (cobalt and copper), Nigeria and Sudan (crude petroleum), Senegal (iron), and many others.

Although now sovereign nations, African countries continue their dependence on external global powers, who extenuate it for their own benefit. According to National Geographic author Knable, in supporting Africa’s mining economy “privitization”, “foreign countries and international organizations began lending money to African nations for infrastructure and mining development projects in exchange for granting mining rights to outside investors… The World Bank invested more than a billion dollars in loans to Africa” but it continues to only “...benefit foreign investors. African countries were also encouraged to offer tax incentives to foreign investors to increase interest in investing in mines”.This has overall reduced revenue for African nations’ governments and citizens.

Former Congolese President Joseph Kabila continued to make significant corruption for mining in the Democratic Republic of the Congo with his deal with Israeli billionaire and businessman in natural resources, Dan Gertler. Gertler’s means of acquiring and purchasing these large mines through the DRC’s failure to publish one of the sales’s full details to the International Monetary Fund, halted their $225 million loan to the DRC. This led to Gertler’s deal in 2013 to sell back an oil block he previously bought from the DRC for $500,000 to $150 million, leading to the loss of millions of dollars entitled to the people of the DRC.

=== Investment ===
The Department of Mineral Resources of South Africa reported that investment in newly committed precious metals projects in South Africa—those for which funds had already been committed or were being expended—was $8.26 billion in 2005. An additional $9.56 billion was reported for potential precious metals projects in South Africa (that is, feasibility-level projects for which funds had not yet been committed). PGM accounted for 69% of the investment and gold 31%. Potential investments in iron ore projects was at least $950 million. Investment in newly committed processed minerals projects amounted to $681 million, and potential processed minerals projects is $584 million.

By 2008, capital expenditure for the heavy mineral sands project at Mandena in Madagascar was expected to total $585 million; at Moma in Mozambique, $348 million; and at Kwale in Kenya, $178 million. By 2010, capital expenditures for bauxite and alumina in Guinea were likely to total more than $2.35 billion; nickel in Madagascar, $2.25 billion; and coal in Mozambique, $1 billion. Substantial capital expenditures were also likely for aluminum in Mozambique and South Africa, cobalt and copper in the Democratic Republic of the Congo (Congo-Kinshasa) and Zambia, crude petroleum in Nigeria and Sudan, iron ore in Senegal, and natural gas in Nigeria. However, commercial investment in mining in Africa has been shown to increase the likelihood of protests in the surrounding area.

=== Exploration ===
Exploration activity, as defined by African exploration budgets reported by the MEG, increased to $807 million in 2005 from $572 million in 2004. Africa's share of the world exploration budget increased slightly to 16.5% in 2005 from 16.1% in 2004. In 2005, the principal mineral targets in Africa were copper, diamond, gold, and platinum group metals (PGM).

In descending order, African countries that experienced the highest levels of exploration activity in 2005 were based on the number of exploration sites as compiled by the USGS, South Africa, Burkina Faso, Ghana, and Zambia. Still, the activity took place in several other countries. Gold accounted for approximately 51% of reported African exploration projects, diamond accounted for about 14%, copper and PGM accounted for about 11%, and nickel accounted for 5%. Early-stage projects accounted for about 77% of the 2005 activity, and feasibility-stage projects accounted for about 12%.

Australian and Canadian junior companies continued to invest time and money in exploring Africa, while South African companies continued to expend a sizable amount of their exploration resources outside of South Africa.

=== Trade ===
Africa's current account surplus amounted to 2.3% of its GDP in 2005 versus 0.1% of GDP in 2004. In 2005, sub-Saharan countries ran an average deficit of 0.6% of the GDP, and countries in the Arab Maghreb Union ran an average surplus of 12.2% of GDP. Trade surpluses in oil-exporting countries more than offset trade deficits in oil-importing countries.

Oil-importing countries had an average current account deficit of 3.3% of the GDP in 2005, and oil-exporting countries had an average current account surplus of 12.2% of GDP. Out of 33 African nations for which information was available, 20 countries experienced a decline in their terms of trade between 2002 and 2005 and 13 experienced an improvement. Oil importers experienced the worst decline. However, Botswana's terms of trade improved because higher prices for oil imports were more than offset by higher prices for diamond exports. Similar reasoning was held for Mozambique because of higher prices for aluminum; in Niger, for uranium; and in Zambia, for copper.

The average current account deficit for oil-importing countries is expected to increase to 4.1% of the GDP in 2006 and to 3.8% of the GDP in 2007. For oil-exporting countries, the surplus is predicted to rise to 15.4% of the GDP in 2006 and 15.8% of the GDP in 2007. Africa was expected to run a current account surplus of 3.6% of the GDP in 2006 and 4.2% of the GDP in 2007.

In 2004 or 2005, mineral fuels accounted for more than 90% of the export earnings of Algeria, Equatorial Guinea, Libya, and Nigeria. Minerals and mineral fuels accounted for more than 80% of the export earnings of Botswana (led by, in order of value, diamond, copper, nickel, soda ash, and gold), Congo (Brazzaville) (petroleum), Congo (Kinshasa) (diamond, petroleum, cobalt, and copper), Gabon (petroleum and manganese), Guinea (bauxite, alumina, gold, and diamond), Sierra Leone (diamond), and Sudan (oil and gold). Minerals and mineral fuels accounted for more than 50% of the export earnings of Mali (gold), Mauritania (iron ore), Mozambique (aluminum), Namibia (diamond, uranium, gold, and zinc), and Zambia (copper and cobalt). Gold was a significant source of export earnings in Ghana, South Africa, and Tanzania. Diamond was a substantial source of export earnings in the Central African Republic and South Africa, as was uranium in Niger.

African Gas
% of production		Destination of LNG	
Algeria	72%	Europe	88%
Nigeria	13%	USA	11%
Egypt	9%	Asia	1%
Libya	6%	Asia	1%

Africa's natural gas exporters included Algeria, which had 72% of the continent's natural gas exports, Nigeria, 13%, Egypt, 9%, and Libya, 6%. Europe received 91% of African total natural gas exports and was the destination of 95% of Africa's natural gas exports by pipeline and 88% of Africa's liquefied natural gas (LNG) exports. The United States received 11% of Africa's LNG exports, and countries of the Asia and the Pacific region, 1%.

In 2005, Europe received 35% of Africa's petroleum exports; the United States, 32%; China, 10%; Japan, 2%; and other countries in Asia and the Pacific region, 12%. West African countries sent 45% of their exports to the United States and 32% to China, Japan, and other countries in the Asia and the Pacific region. North African countries sent 64% of their exports to Europe and 18% to the United States. Intraregional exports to African countries amounted to only 2% of total African petroleum exports.

However, intraregional minerals trade was significant in the case of gold. South Africa imported 142,000 kilograms per year of gold, mostly from West African countries, to supply its gold refinery. A majority of African gold mine production was refined in South Africa before export to other regions.

Most of Africa's copper and platinum group metals PGM production was exported in refined form. The majority of Africa's chromite production was processed into ferrochromium before export. For other commodities, which included bauxite, colored gemstones, diamond, iron ore, petroleum, and uranium, most of or all the continent's production was exported before downstream processing.

=== The green transition opens for increased mineral demand ===
The transition to clean or low-carbon energy technologies, such as electric vehicle batteries, solar photovoltaic, hydrogen, wind power, etc, is predicted to push up global demand for some key "green" minerals. These minerals have been deemed essential for a clean energy future. They also play a vital role in supporting rapid expansion of digital technologies such as mobile cellphones, computers, and semiconductors for artificial intelligence systems.

“Green minerals” refers to minerals extracted and processed using sustainable, low-carbon methods in order to reduce environmental impacts of mining while establishing a reliable and ethically sourced supply of materials needed for global decarbonization.

The International Energy Agency (IEA) has identified 37 such critical minerals and estimates that by 2050 global demand for these will increase by 235 per cent. Africa has large reserves of many of these green minerals, such as lithium, nickel, bauxite, cobalt, copper, chromium, manganese and graphite. The African Union has outlined a policy framework, the Africa Mining Vision, to leverage the continent’s mineral reserves and youth boom in pursuit of sustainable development and socio-economic transformation. Achieving these goals requires mineral-rich African economies to transition from commodity export to manufacture of higher value-added products.

== Legislation ==
In September 2004, the Eritrean government ordered a halt to all mineral exploration activity in the country while it reviewed its Mining Act. The government suspension was lifted in January 2005. The government increased the maximum possible equity interest that it may hold in a project through an option agreement from 20% to 30%.

Effective February 28, 2005, platinum producers could no longer hold proceeds from Zimbabwean mining activity in foreign accounts to fund exploration and development in that country. The loss of direct access to these earnings may make it more difficult for foreign companies to fund exploration in Zimbabwe.

At the end of 2004, the government of Liberia passed legislation providing for controls on the export, import, and transit of rough diamond. In addition, the government suspended the issuance of all permits for diamond mining and placed a moratorium on alluvial diamond prospecting.

On December 15, 2005, the Parliament of Ghana passed a new Minerals and Mining Law (law number 703). The new law provides for access to mineral rights on a first-come, first-considered basis; a specific time frame within which all applications should be granted; the right for applicants to demand written reasons from the Minister if an application is rejected; the government's right to acquire land or authorize its occupation and use if the land is required for mining purposes; the establishment of a cadastral system for the administration of mineral rights; the establishment of the permissible range of royalty rates at not less than 3% or more than 6% of total mining revenues; the government's right to obtain a 10% free-carried interest in mining leases; and the establishment of the period of duration of a mining lease, which is not to exceed 30 years and which may be renewed once for a period not to exceed an additional 30 years.

In South Africa, the Government's Black Economic Empowerment program required that black ownership of the mining industry reach 15% by 2009 and 26% by 2014. Recent actions to increase black ownership included the acquisition of 20% of Gold Fields by black-owned Mvelaphanda Resources Ltd. by 2009; the transfer of mines held by AngloGold Ashanti to black-owned African Rainbow Minerals; and the acquisition of 30% of Sallies Ltd. by African Renaissance Investments (Pty) Ltd.

== Environment ==
Although legislation has passed new mineral and mining laws in order to authorize land for mining purposes and establish rates, rights, and durations to lease land, there are still ongoing environmental consequences of the mining industry that affect African sociolinguistic groups' economy and livelihood. Deforestation for fuel use and land-intensive agricultural production continued to be a significant environmental issue in many African countries. Other causes of deforestation included artisanal production of gemstones, lime, and sand and gravel. The West African Gas Pipeline, which was expected to start regular operations in the end of 2008, could help mitigate the effects of deforestation in Benin, Ghana, and Togo and reduce emissions of greenhouse gases. In 2005 natural gas was being flared by Nigeria; in the future, Nigeria expected to export natural gas to Benin, Ghana, and Togo. The government of Nigeria had committed to ending the flaring of natural gas, which would lead to decreased pollution.

The use of mercury by artisanal gold miners has led to serious air and water pollution in Ghana, Kenya, Mozambique, South Africa, Sudan, Tanzania, and Zimbabwe. The Global Environment Facility, the United Nations Development Programme, and the United Nations Industrial Development Organization began the Global Mercury Project in August 2002 to alleviate these problems. The Global Mercury Project has been providing cleaner technologies and training for miners, conducting health assessments, and helping institute government regulatory capacities. Justice for the African people enduring negative environmental effects is an ongoing challenge that tears apart rural local communities that cannot live without the environmental resources being consumed by the mineral industry.

== Environmental Justice ==
Africa as a continent faces significant challenges as the largest exporter of gold and diamonds. National Geographic author Boudreau writes, “In 2021, Africa produced 680.3 metric tons of gold. The continent produces around 65 percent of the world’s diamonds by value each year”. Civil wars between countries in Africa are funded by the conflict and blood diamond industry that continue to violate human rights laws and fuel environmental degradation and depletion of the lands.

According to Toto, a multimedia journalist apart of the Central Africa Staff quotes Eric Denécé, director of the French Intelligence Research Centre that in the 1990s the Congolese Civil War had a death toll of 400,000.

Environmental degradation has significantly impacted the landscape of these mining areas. In Bamegoard, the Sangha region of the northern Republic of Congo there is, “...destruction taking place in an area designated for a Reducing Emissions from Deforestation and Forest Degradation (REDD+) program funded by the World Bank’s Forest Carbon Partnership Facility (FCPF)”. At least 79 semi-industrial gold mining and exploration permits have been granted by the Congolese Minister of Mines Pierre Oba over the last four years causing this degradation.

Many Congolese villages have fallen to mineral extraction. The administrative chief officer, Aristide Elong, of one of the villages used to come to this forest to fish and collect drinking water. But today, that is no longer possible. Elong states, “There used to be forest here, but now the landscape is destroyed — there are no trees left. The river is just mud. How can we get the water back? We can’t drink it, and the fish can’t survive in water like this.”

In the Sangha region’s Bakouele Indigenous community, member Copince Ngoma and his family depend on forest resources for survival. He has “hunted, fished, and gathered medicinal plants for his family in the forests surrounding his home his whole life…” However, this traditional way of life has been disrupted by semi-industrial gold mining. “We used to drink this water, but not anymore, because it’s become dirty.” Ngoma explains. With the destruction of water sources, plants and wildlife, the forest has been abandoned, and its resources are rapidly dwindling. “We used to hunt gazelles, monkeys. … Now, to catch anything, you have to travel at least 20 kilometers [approximately 12 miles]...Before, I could go hunting and come back after a few hours with animals. Now, if I want to bring something back, I have to leave my wife alone for a day or two. We’re suffering. Since this morning, the children have eaten nothing but guavas — that’s not a meal,” says Ngoma. Justification for this expansion of mining operations has fallen under the catch-all term of ‘Development’, although in reality, it is providing detriment to local residents, who are supposed to be its primary beneficiaries. Toto states, “The population survives on an average of less than $5 a day… most rural communities lack access to telephone networks, hospitals and schools.”

Prior to colonialism, “these resources have allowed people to live in Africa without degrading the land or its ecosystems”, yet Africa’s natural resources facilitate production of technology without investment in local communities. In 2003, the United Nations created the Kimberley Process Certification Scheme (KPCS). The KPCS also aims to “prevent diamond sales from financing wars” in which they have been able to reduce the production of blood diamonds; however it still does not address the concerns related to human rights or environmental degradation as “Asia, Europe, and North America continue to vie for control and influence over Africa and its resources.”

== Metals ==
=== Aluminium, bauxite, and alumina ===
From 2000 to 2005, African production of refined aluminium increased by 54%. In Mozambique, the Mozal smelter was completed in 2000, and the Mozal 2 smelter, in 2003. South Africa's production increased because of the expansion of the Hillside smelter in December 2003. Output also increased in Cameroon and Egypt. In Ghana, the Valco smelter was shut down because of droughts that reduced the country's effective hydropower capacity. South Africa accounted for about 48% of African aluminium output; Mozambique, 32%; and Egypt, 14%. Kenya was the only African producer of secondary refined aluminium. Africa accounted for 5% of the world's aluminium production in 2005.

African bauxite production declined by about 3% from 2000 to 2005. From 1990 to 2005, Africa's share of world bauxite production decreased to 9% from 16%. Guinea accounted for about 95% of African bauxite production; Ghana accounted for most of the remainder. In 2005, Guinea was the only African producer of alumina.

In 2005, world aluminium consumption amounted to 31.6 million metric tons (t) compared with 29.9 t in 2004. African consumption of aluminium increased by 3.4% in 2005. In South Africa, aluminium consumption increased to 374,000 t in 2005 from 342,000 t in 2004.

The production of refined aluminium is expected to rise by an average of about 10% per year from 2005 to 2011. The Mozal 3 smelter in Mozambique and the Coega smelter in South Africa are expected to open in mid-2009 and late 2010, respectively. In Cameroon, Alcan Inc. plans to triple production from its smelter by 2010. Aluminium Smelter Co. of Nigeria Ltd. could reopen its smelter at Ikot Abasi by 2009 and reach full capacity by 2011. In Ghana, Alcoa Inc. plans to increase production at the Valco smelter starting in 2006.

African bauxite production was likely to increase by an average of about 10% per year from 2005 to 2011. In Guinea, planned increases in alumina refining capacity of about 5 million metric tons per year in 2008 and 2009 are expected to lead to higher bauxite production. The Sangarédi and the Kamsar refineries are likely to start production in late 2008 and 2009, respectively, and the expansion of the Friguia refinery could be completed in 2009. The reopening of the Sierra Mineral Holdings bauxite mine in 2006 and the restart of mining in the Kambia District in 2010 could increase Sierra Leone's bauxite production to 2.7 Mt in 2011.

=== Copper ===
Africa's mine production of copper increased by 48% from 2000 to 2005. Zambia was the leading producer in Africa; the country's increasing production was attributable to higher output from the Mufulira and the Nkana Mines and the reopening of the Chambishi Mine. The production increase in Congo (Kinshasa) was mostly attributable to the opening of the Lonshi Mine and the Dikulushi Mine in 2001 and 2002, respectively. South Africa's output declined because of lower production from the Palabora Mine and the closure of the Maranda Mine in 2004. In 2005, Zambia accounted for 65% of African copper mine production; South Africa, 15%; and Congo (Kinshasa), 13%. Africa's share of world copper mine production was 5% in 2005 compared with 14% in 1990.

Africa's refined copper production rose by 40% from 2000 to 2005; increased production from the Bwana Mkubwa and the Mufulira plants in Zambia more than offset lower South African output. In South Africa, production declined because of lower output from the Palabora refinery. In 2005, Zambia accounted for 77% of African refined copper production; South Africa, 19%; and Egypt, 3%. Congo (Kinshasa), which accounted for 37% of continental refined copper output in 1990, had ceased production by 2000. Egypt was the only producer of secondary refined copper; primary production accounted for most African production.

In 2005, world refined copper consumption increased to 16.8 Metric tonnes from 16.7 t in 2004; African consumption of copper amounted to about 170,000 t in 2005. South Africa's consumption declined to 82,000 t in 2005 from 84,000 t in 2004.

African copper mine production was expected to rise by an average of about 16% per year from 2005 to 2011. Congo (Kinshasa) could account for about one-half of the increase in output. Nikanor plc planned to open the Kananga and the Tilwezembe mines in 2006 and 2007, respectively, and to restart production at the Kamoto-Oliveira-Virgule (KOV) Mine in late 2009. Central African Mining and Exploration Company plc (CAMEC) was expected to open a new mine during the first quarter of 2008 and to reach full capacity in 2009. Tenke Mining planned to start the Tenke Fungurume project in late 2008. Anvil Mining Ltd. planned to increase production at Kulu in 2006 and to open the Mutoshi Mine in early 2007. Metorex Ltd. is likely to start the Ruashi Tailings project in mid-2006 and the Ruashi Mine in July 2008. Other new sources of production include the Kolwezi Tailings project in 2008 and the Etoile Mine in 2009. The Ruashi Tailings project and the Lonshi Mine were expected to be shut down in 2010.

Output was likely to rise sharply in Zambia because of higher production from the Kansanshi mine in 2006 and the opening of the Chingola and the Lumwana mine in 2007 and 2009, respectively. Expansions are planned for the Mufulira, the Mufulira South, and the Nkana Mines in 2007.

In Botswana, the Dukwe mine was expected to open in 2009 and to reach full capacity by 2011; production from the Phoenix Mine was likely to triple by 2011. Nevsun Resources Ltd. planned to start mining from a copper-rich zone at Bisha in Eritrea in 2010. In Mauritania, the Guelb Moghrein Mine started to produce refined copper in late 2006. South Africa's production could increase because of the expansion of the Limpopo PGM mine.

The production of refined copper was expected to rise by an average of 17% per year from 2005 to 2011. Zambia's production is expected to increase because of higher output from the Mufulira refinery and the Bwana Mkubwa and the Kansanshi solvent extraction-electrowinning (SX-EW) plants in 2006 and the Konkola SX-EW plants by 2007. In Congo (Kinshasa), new SX-EW plants could open at the Kolwezi Tailings project and the Mutoshi Mine in early 2008, and at the KOV Mine in late 2009. CAMEC planned to start production at the Luita plant in 2008. Congo (Kinshasa), which did not produce refined copper in 2000, could account for more than 25% of Africa's refined copper output by 2011.

=== Gold ===
Africa's gold mine production was 522,000 kilograms/1,148,400 pounds in 2005, which was a decrease of 14% compared with that of 2000. Production was considerably less than that of 1990 because of the long-term decline in South African production. From 1990 to 2005, Africa's share of world gold mine production decreased from 32% to about 21%.

In South Africa, the decrease in production since 2000 was broad based, with output declining at the Great Noligwa Mine, the Driefontein, the Kloof mine, the Mponeng, the Savuka Mine, and the TauTona Mines. The Ergo mine, the North West, and the St. Helena Mines have been closed. The decline in Ghana's production was partially attributable to lower output at the Bibiani Mine. Output also decreased in Zimbabwe.

In Tanzania, production increased in recent years because of the opening of the Geita Mine in 2000; the Bulyanhulu Mine in 2001; the North Mara Gold Mine in 2002; the Buhemba Mine in 2003; and the Tulawaka Mine in 2005. The Bulyanhulu Mine, the North Mara Gold Mine, and the Tulawaka Mine are all owned or operated by Barrick Gold. Output increased since 2000 in Mali because of the opening of the Loulo, the Morila, and the Yatela Mines. The Mupane and the Samira Hill Gold Mines were opened in Botswana and Niger, respectively; these countries had only artisanal gold production before 2004.

In 2005, South Africa accounted for 56% of African gold production; Ghana, 13%; Tanzania, 10%; and Mali, 8%. South Africa's share of continental gold production continued to decline from 89% in 1990 because of rising production costs associated with deeper underground operations and increased production in Ghana, Guinea, Mali, and Tanzania.

Gold mine production in Africa is expected to increase by 17% from 2005 to 2009. The long-term decline in South Africa's production could be reversed because of the expected completion of the Moab Khotsong mine in 2006, the Dominion Mine in 2007, the Tshepong Decline project in 2008, the Phakisa Shaft in 2009, and the planned expansion of the Masimong Mine in 2010. By 2011, these projects could more than offset the shutdown of the Ergo and the North West Mines in 2005, the planned closure of the Crown Mine in 2009, and lower production from the Great Noligwa, the Kopanang, and the Tau Lekoa Mines.

In Ghana, the outlook is for a substantial increase in output because of the expected opening of the Ahafo mine in the second half of 2006 and the Akyem Mine in 2008 and higher production from the Chirano Gold Mine and the Wassa Mines. Output is expected to decline at the Bibiani Mine.

Tanzania's production was likely to rise to 60 tonnes by 2009 with the opening of the Buckreef Mine in 2007 and the Buzwagi Gold Mine in 2008 and the increased capacity at the North Mara Mine; these increases could more than offset the decreased production at the Geita Gold Mine. Production in Tanzania was expected to decline to 56 t by 2011 because of the planned closure of the Tulawaka Gold Mine in 2010. In Mali, the opening of the Tabakoto Mine in 2006 and the reopening of the Syama Mine in 2008 are likely to be offset by the shutdown of the Yatela Mine in 2007 and lower production at the Morila Gold Mine.

Several African countries that had only artisanal gold production in 2005 are likely to open large-scale gold mines in the near future. By January 2008, production was expected to start at the Bonikro gold deposit in Côte d'Ivoire. In Mauritania, Rio Narcea Gold Mines Ltd. plans to start production at the Tasiast Gold Mine by mid-2007. The Youga and the Taparko Mines are expected to open in Burkina Faso by 2007 and 2009, respectively. Gold-rich zones in the Bisha Mine in Eritrea are planned to be mined from 2008 to 2010. In Congo (Kinshasa), the Kilo Moto Mine could open in 2009. Sudan's only large-scale gold mine is expected to shut down in 2010. Tigui Camara, who holds concessions in Guinea and Ivory Coast, is the only woman in West Africa to own a mining company, Tigui Mining Group, which is partly run as a social enterprise.

=== Iron and steel ===
African production of crude steel increased by 27% from 2000 to 2005. The majority of the increase was attributable to Egypt. South Africa accounted for 54% of regional crude steel production; Egypt, 32%; Libya, 7%; and Algeria, 6%. Africa's share of world crude steel production amounted to 2% in 2005. South Africa produced about 7.1 t of hot-rolled steel products in 2005, and Libya, 1.67 t Other African producers of hot-rolled steel products included Algeria, Egypt, Morocco, and Tunisia.

Africa accounted for 2% of the world's finished steel consumption. Africa consumed 18 t of finished steel products in 2005 compared with 17.5 t in 2004 and 15 t in 2000.

Crude steel production was expected to rise by an average of about 5% per year from 2005 to 2011. Nigeria, which accounted for less than 1% of African crude steel output in 2005, could increase its share to 10% by 2011 with the opening of the Ajaokuta plant in 2006 and higher production at the Delta plant. In South Africa, the expansion of the Vanderbijlpark plant was scheduled to take place from 2006 to 2009. In Algeria, increased use of existing capacity was expected to raise national steel production to 2.5 t by 2011. Production could increase in Zimbabwe as Zimbabwe Iron and Steel Company restores its capacity; improvement in this company's situation depends upon the restoration of economic and political stability. African consumption of finished steel is expected to rise to 19 t by 2008.

=== Iron ore ===
In 2005, the iron content of ore produced in Africa amounted to 34.8 tonnes compared with 32.1 tonnes in 2000. Higher production from the Sishen and the Thabazimbi Mines in South Africa more than offset lower output in Egypt and Mauritania. South Africa was the leading iron ore producer in Africa and accounted for 72% of continental output; Mauritania, 21%; and Egypt, 5%.

The iron content of ore produced in Africa is expected to increase to almost 62 tonnes in 2011. In South Africa, the expansion of the Sishen Mine is likely to be completed in 2009; a further expansion of the mine could be completed by 2011. Production at the Bruce, the King, and the Mokaning Mines (BKM) could start in 2008; a proposed expansion of the mines could be completed in 2010. The opening of BKM would more than offset the expected decline in output from the Beeshok Mine after 2008. The F Faleme iron ore project in Senegal could start production in 2011. In Nigeria, mining is expected to restart at the Ajaybanko and the I Itakpe iron ore deposits in 2006 or 2007 and to reach full production by 2009. Output was also expected to increase in Algeria.

=== Lead ===
From 2000 to 2005, African lead mine production decreased by nearly 39%. South Africa's production declined because of lower production at the Black Mountain Mine and the closure of the Pering Mine in 2003. The decrease in Morocco's output was attributable to the closure of the Touissit Mine in 2002 and technical problems experienced by Compagnie Minière de Guemassa. In Tunisia, the Bouhabeur and the Fej Lahdoum Mines were closed in 2004, and the Bougrine Mine, in 2005. In Namibia, output increased at the Rosh Pinah mine. In 2005, Morocco and South Africa accounted for 39% each of African lead mine production, and Namibia, 13%. Africa's share of the world's lead mine production was about 3% in 2005.

African production of primary refined lead declined by 45% compared with that of 2000; the decrease may have been attributable to lower lead mine production in Morocco. Production also declined in Algeria. Morocco, which was the leading African producer of primary refined lead, accounted for 88% of continental output. From 2000 to 2005, Africa's production of secondary refined lead increased by 34%. South Africa accounted for 86% of African secondary refined lead output; Kenya, Morocco, and Nigeria accounted for the remainder. The share of primary lead in total refined lead production in Africa declined to 35% in 2005 from 64% in 1995 and 72% in 1990.

In 2004, world refined lead consumption was about 7.08 t compared with 6.8 Mt in 2003. South African lead consumption increased to 80,700 t in 2004 from 78,700 t in 2003.

The decline in African lead mine production is likely to continue, with output expected to decline by 22% from 2005 to 2011. Most of the decrease would be attributable to the closure of the Bougrine Mine in Tunisia in 2005 and the Rosh Pinah Mine in Namibia by 2010. Secondary refined lead production is expected to increase in South Africa in 2006.

=== Nickel ===
African mine production of nickel increased by nearly 9% from 2000 to 2005. South Africa accounted for most of the increase in production; output also increased in Botswana and Zimbabwe. The majority of South Africa's nickel output was a coproduct of platinum metals group mining. Higher South African production was partially attributable to increased output from the Nkomati mine. In 2005, South Africa accounted for 47% of African nickel mine output; Botswana, 43%; and Zimbabwe, 9%. Minor tonnages of nickel were recovered as a byproduct of cobalt operations in Morocco.

In 2004, South Africa's consumption of nickel increased to 25,000 tonnes from 24,000 tonnes in 2003. The stainless steel industry accounted for most of South Africa's nickel demand.

Nickel mine production is likely to double from 2005 to 2011. The startup of the Ambatovy nickel and cobalt mine in 2009 in Madagascar is expected to account for the majority of the increase. Madagascar, which did not mine nickel in 2005, could have a 33% share of African nickel mine production by 2011. South Africa's output is expected to nearly double by 2011 because of increased capacity at the Nkomati nickel mine and the Limpopo and the Marikana PGM mines. In Zambia, Albidon Ltd. planned to start production from the Munali project in 2008. Production could increase at the Mimosa PGM mine in Zimbabwe. Botswana's production is likely to decline because of the closure of the Selebi-Phikwe mine in 2011 or 2012.

=== Platinum-group metals ===
From 2000 to 2005, Africa's production of palladium and platinum increased by 55% and 47%, respectively. South African production increased because of higher output from the Bafokeng mine, the Impala mine, the Kroondal mine, the Marikana, and the Rustenburg Mines, and the opening of the Modikwa mine in 2002. Production increased in Zimbabwe because of higher output from the Mimosa mine and the opening of the Ngezi mine in 2001. South Africa, which was the continent's dominant producer of platinum group metals (PGM) in Africa, accounted for 97% and 96% of the production of platinum and palladium, respectively.

African mine production of palladium is expected to increase by an average of between 4% and 5% per year from 2005 to 2011, and platinum, by between 3% and 4% per year. In South Africa, the increase is likely to be attributable to the opening of the Mototolo mine in late 2006 and the Two Rivers mine in 2007; the expansions of the Marula mine in 2007 and 2009, the Limpopo Mine in 2007 and 2010, the Rustenburg Mine in 2008, and the Nkomati mine by the end of 2009; and higher production from the Everest, the Kroondal, the Marikana, and the Modikwa Mines. Higher output in Zimbabwe is likely to result from the expansion of the Mimosa and the Ngezi Mines and the opening of the Unki mine in 2009.

=== Zinc ===
From 2000 to 2005, Africa's mine production of zinc declined by about 17%. The decrease in Morocco's output was attributable to technical problems experienced by Compagnie Minère de Guemassa. In South Africa, the closure of the Pering mine in 2003 and the Maranda Mine in 2004 more than offset higher output from the Black Mountain Mine. In Tunisia, the Bouhabeur and the Fej Lahdoum Mines were closed in 2004, and the Bougrine Mine, in 2005. Algerian output declined because of the shutdown of El Abed and the Kherzet Youcef Mines. Namibia's production increased because of the opening of the Skorpion Zinc mine; production also restarted at Slag Treatment Plant Lubumbashi in Congo (Kinshasa). In 2005, Morocco accounted for 36% of African zinc mine production; Namibia, 32%; South Africa, 15%; and Tunisia, 7%. Africa's share of world zinc mine production was about 2% in 2005. African production of zinc metal increased by 85% compared with that of 2000. In Namibia, the Skorpion smelter was opened in 2003. Production declined in Algeria and South Africa. Namibia, which did not produce zinc metal before 2003, accounted for 48% of continental zinc metal production in 2005. South Africa's share declined to 40% in 2005 from 75% in 2000, and Algeria's share, to 12% from 25%.

In 2005, world refined zinc consumption remained nearly unchanged at about 10.3 Mt. South African zinc consumption increased to 103,000 t in 2005 from 91,000 t in 2004.

The decline in African zinc mine production was likely to continue, with output declining by 13% from 2005 to 2011. Most of the decrease would be attributable to the closure of the Bougrine Mine in Tunisia in 2005 and the Rosh Pinah mine in Namibia by 2010. In Congo (Kinshasa), the proposed reopening of the Kipushi Mine and the reprocessing of zinc and germanium tailings near Kolwezi could lead to further increases in production, but whether these projects will be implemented by the end of 2011 is uncertain. Higher production from the Skorpion smelter in Namibia could increase regional production of zinc metal by nearly 8% by 2007. This increase would more than offset the decreased output expected from the Zincor Mine in South Africa.

See

=== Titanium ===
Although there have been many problems with titanium mining in Africa, it has not been halted by environmental problems due to the polluting nature of processing rutile, a principal titanium ore. There are now titanium mining mines open in a few countries in Africa (Kenya, Mozambique, Sierra Leone, South Africa).

== Industrial minerals ==
=== Diamond ===
In 2005, Africa's share of world diamond production, by volume, was 46%. African diamond production increased by nearly 51% in 2005 compared with that of 2000. The increase in output was broadly based, with production rising in Angola, Botswana, Congo (Kinshasa), Ghana, Guinea, Lesotho, Namibia, Sierra Leone, South Africa, and Zimbabwe. Production declined in the Central African Republic and Tanzania.

Congo (Kinshasa) accounted for nearly one-half of the increase in production, by volume. Increased political stability and the Kimberley Process led to higher production by artisanal miners. Societé Minière de Bakwanga (MIBA) increased its output. In addition, Sengamines and Midamines SPRL started mining operations in 2001 and 2005, respectively.

In Botswana, production increased at the Jwaneng diamond mine, the Letlhakane diamond mine, and the Orapa diamond mine, and the Damtshaa diamond mine opened. In South Africa, production increased at the Finsch diamond mine, the Kimberley diamond mine, the Namaqualand, and the Venetia Diamond Mine. In Namibia, higher production was attributable to Namdeb Diamond Corporation (Pty) Ltd. The Murowa diamond mine commenced production in Zimbabwe in 2004. Botswana accounted for 35% of African diamond output by volume; Congo (Kinshasa), 34%; South Africa, 17%; and Angola, 8%.

In 2005, the global value of rough diamond production amounted to $12.7 billion, of which Africa accounted for about 60%. Botswana accounted for 24% of the value of global rough diamond output; South Africa, 12%; Angola, 11%; Congo (Kinshasa), 8%; and Namibia, 5%.

In November 2002, the Kimberley Process Certification Scheme was established to reduce the trade of conflict diamonds, particularly diamonds originating from Angola, Congo (Kinshasa), and Sierra Leone. The establishment of the Kimberley Process involved officials from more than 50 countries that produced, processed, and imported diamond as well as representatives from the European Union, the World Diamond Council, the African Diamond Council and nongovernmental organizations. As of 2005, the following African countries had met the minimum requirements of the Kimberley Process Certification Scheme: Angola, Botswana, Central African Republic, Congo (Kinshasa), Côte d'Ivoire, Guinea, Lesotho, Mauritius, Namibia, Sierra Leone, South Africa, Swaziland, Tanzania, Togo, and Zimbabwe.

Illicit diamond production controlled by the Kimberley Process focused on Côte d'Ivoire and Liberia in 2005. At the Kimberley Process plenary session held in Moscow in November, the Chair called for action to be taken to help provide technical assistance to countries neighboring Côte d'Ivoire to strengthen controls on diamond trade.

The production of rough diamond is expected to increase by an average of nearly 3% per year from 2005 to 2011. In Angola, the Fucauma Diamond Mine, the Kamachia-Kamajiku, the Luarica diamond mine, and the Rio Lapi Garimpo Mines are expected to contribute to higher output. Production could rise in Congo (Kinshasa) because of the possible expansion of MIBA's facilities by 2010. European Diamonds plc started production in Lesotho in 2005; the company planned to reach full capacity in 2006. Zimbabwe's production could increase because of higher production from Murowa diamond mine. Output was expected to rise in Namibia and Tanzania because of expansions at mines operated by DeBeers Group.

=== Phosphate rock ===
In 2005, the diphosphorous pentoxide (P_{2}O_{5}) content of African phosphate rock production amounted to about 14.6 Mt compared with 12.5 Mt in 2000. The majority of the increase in output was attributable to higher production by Office Cherifien des Phosphates in Morocco; Egypt's production also increased. Morocco, which was the leading producer of phosphate rock in Africa, accounted for 60% of continental phosphate rock output in 2004; Tunisia, 16%; and South Africa, 7%.

The P_{2}O_{5} content of African phosphate rock production is expected to remain nearly unchanged through 2011. In Morocco, Office Cherifien des Phosphates could complete an expansion by 2009. Production is expected to decline in Algeria and Tunisia.

== Mineral fuels ==
=== Coal ===
African coal production increased by 9% from 2000 to 2005; most of the increase was attributable to South Africa. The Goedgevonden mine, the Mafube, and the Isibonelo Mines opened in 2003, 2004, and 2005, respectively, and production increased at a number of other mines. Output also increased in Botswana, Egypt, Malawi, Niger, Swaziland, and Zambia and decreased in Morocco and Zimbabwe. South Africa, which was the dominant coal producer in Africa, accounted for 98% of regional coal output; Zimbabwe, 1%; and others, less than 1%. More than 99% of South Africa's coal production was bituminous coal. Africa accounted for about 5% of total world anthracite and bituminous coal production in 2005.

Africa accounted for about 3% of world coal consumption in 2005. Within the region, South Africa accounted for 92% of African coal consumption. Nearly 71% of South Africa's coal production was consumed domestically. From 2000 to 2005, Africa's consumption of coal increased by about 12%.

African coal production is expected to increase by an average of 3% per year from 2005 to 2011. South Africa is likely to be responsible for the majority of the increase; its production could increase to 276 Mt by 2011. Higher output would be attributable to the opening of the Kriel South Mine in 2005, the Forzando South Mine in 2006, the Mooikraal Mine in mid-2007, and the Inyanda Mine in 2008; and the expansions of the Goedgevonden and the Leeuwpan coal mine in 2006, the Syferfontein Mine in 2007, the Mafube Mine in 2008, and the Grootegeluk Mine in 2010. Mozambique is expected to become the second-ranked coal producer in Africa with the development of the Moatize Project in 2010. Botswana is likely to become the third-ranked producer because of the expansion of the Morupule Colliery in 2008 and the start of production at the Mmamabula project in 2011. In Zimbabwe, output could increase at Hwange Colliery by 2011 if economic and political stability are restored. Production is also expected to rise in Malawi, Nigeria, and Tanzania.

=== Uranium ===
In 2005, African uranium mine production increased by 7% compared to 2000. Most of the increase was attributable to higher production at the Rossing uranium mine in Namibia; Niger's output also increased. South Africa's production declined because of lower gold mine output. Namibia accounted for 46% of African uranium production; Niger, 44%; and South Africa, less than 10%. In 1990, Niger's and South Africa's shares of continental production were 30% and 27%, respectively. Africa accounted for about 16% of the world's uranium production in 2005.

South Africa was the only regional consumer of uranium in 2005. Africa accounted for less than 1% of the electricity generated worldwide by nuclear power.

Continental uranium mine production is expected to rise by 10% per year from 2005 to 2011. Namibia's uranium production is likely to increase substantially with the opening of the Langer Heinrich Mine in late 2006 and its planned expansion, which could be completed by 2010 or 2011. In South Africa, the Dominion mine is expected to open in 2007 and to produce more than 1,800 t/yr of uranium oxide (U_{3}O_{8}) in 2010. AngloGold Ashanti Ltd. plans to increase uranium production from its South African gold mines by 40% by 2009. Paladin Energy of Australia plans to produce about 1,500 t/yr of U_{3}O_{8} from the Kayelekera Project in Malawi starting in the third quarter of 2008.

== Oil ==
In 2005, exported African oil was distributed as 35% to the EU, 32% to the US, 10% to China, and 1% of African gas goes to Asia. North African preferentially exporting its oil to western countries was EU 64%; US 18%; all others 18%.

== See also ==
- Economy of Africa
- Iron ore in Africa
- Cement in Africa
- Mining industry of the Democratic Republic of the Congo
- Pan African Resource Reporting Code

== General references ==
- Thomas R. Yager; Omayra Bermúdez-Lugo; Philip M. Mobbs; Harold R. Newman; Mowafa Taib; Glenn J. Wallace; David R. Wilburn (August 2012). "The Mineral Industries of Africa" (PDF). 2012 Minerals Yearbook. U.S. Geological Survey, PD license (U.S. government source, public domain).
