= Mining industry of Tanzania =

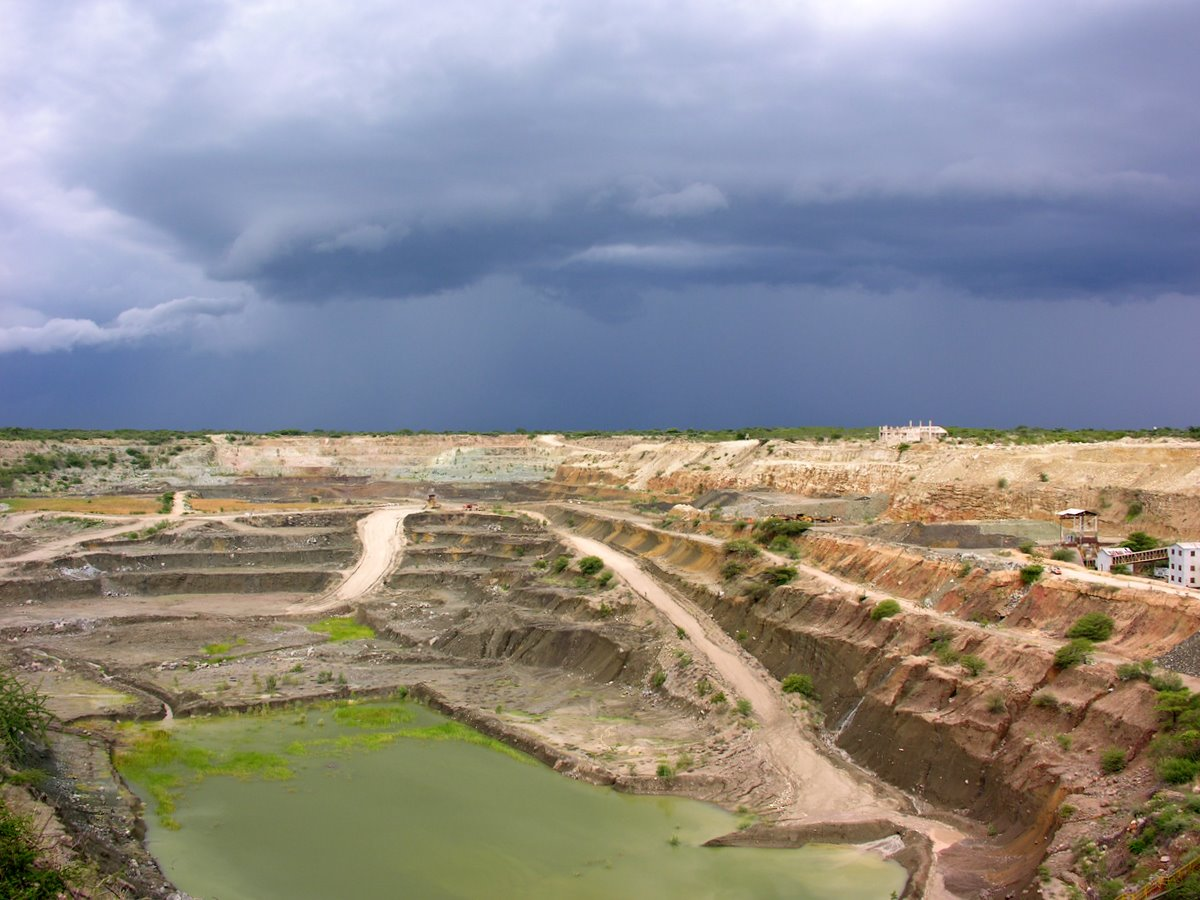
Williamson diamond mine

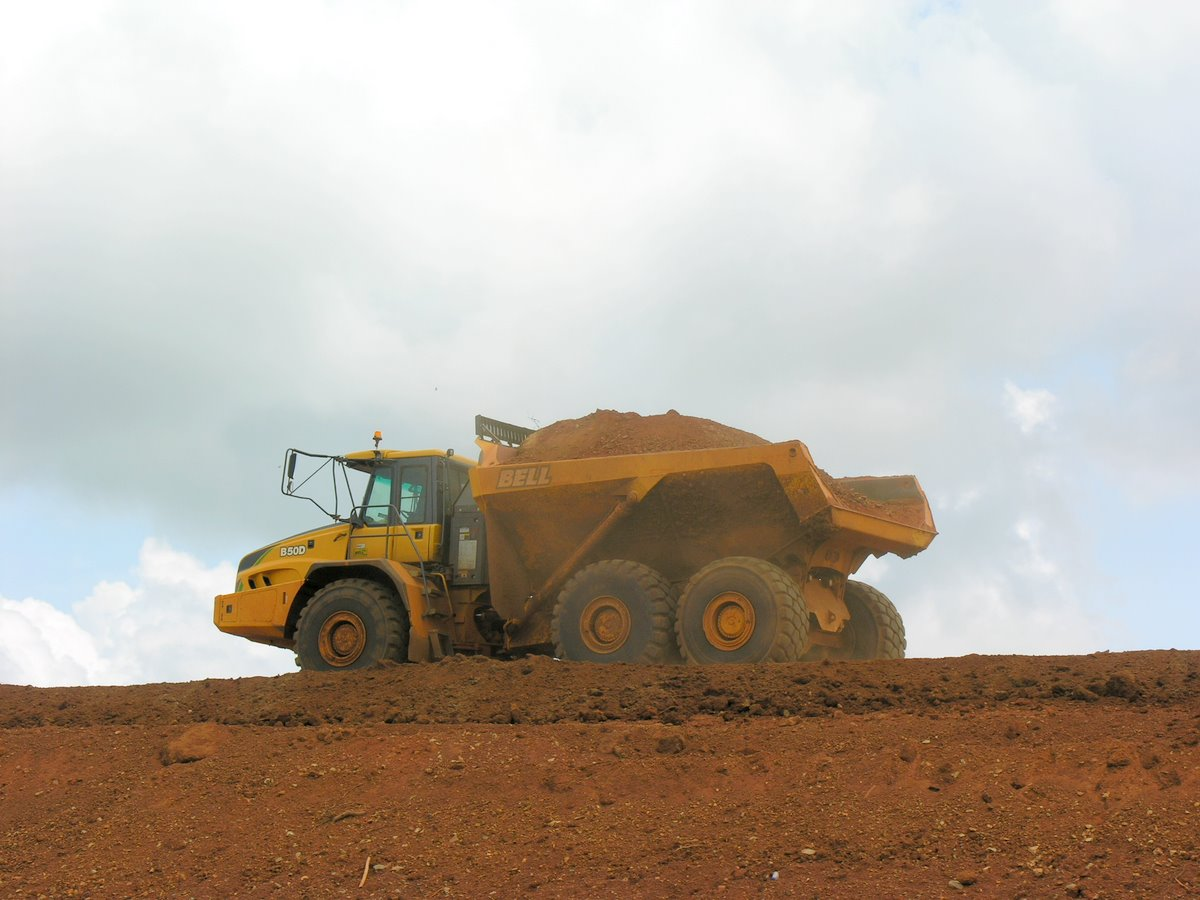
Haul truck at the Buzwagi Gold Mine

Tanzania is a land rich in minerals. Mining makes up more than 50% of the country's total exports, of which a large part comes from gold. The country has gold reserves of 10 million ounces, generating revenue of over a billion USD. Diamonds are also found in significant amounts. Since it was opened in 1940, the Williamson diamond mine has produced 19 million carats (3,800 kg) of diamonds. Gemstones, nickel, copper, uranium, kaolin, titanium, cobalt and platinum are also mined in Tanzania. Illegal mining and corruption are ongoing problems. In 2017, the government passed a series of bills aimed at increasing revenue from minerals after a scandal which caused the dismissal of the Minister for Energy and Minerals.

== History ==
Although the mining industry was originally government owned and controlled, the mining laws were relaxed in the 1980s and 1990s to allow for private ownership of mining claims and the introduction of foreign companies. In 2008, the mining industry employed an estimated one million people in artisanal operations, although an accurate figure is difficult to obtain given the nature of the industry. In 2011, the contribution of the mining sector to the economy rose by 2.1% above the 2010 figure of 2.7%. As of 2011, there were 50,000 artisanal miners involved in the mining of colored gemstones. In 2015 the World Bank offered Tanzania a US$45 million loan to improve the small scale mining industry in rural Tanzania.

== Production and impact ==
Illegal mining is prevalent in Tanzania, and poses a significant risk to those undertaking the practice. In 2015, a tunnel collapsed in an illegal mine near the Bulyanhulu Gold Mine, killing 19 people.

Employees at smaller mines in Tanzania have to deal with significantly poorer ventilation than their counterparts at larger operations. Exposure to silica at a small mine is more than two hundred times that at a larger site, while overall airborne silica exposure is more than three hundred times the limit set by NIOSH in the United States. Tuberculosis in Tanzanian miners is significantly higher than the country's average.

== Legal framework ==
Mining was strictly controlled and operated by the government during the 1970s and 1980s. Mining claims were then opened up to individuals, which sparked the small scale mining industry of Tanzania. In the 1990s, the laws were further relaxed to encourage the introduction of companies who would export the mining products, and investment by international mining companies which opened up large scale mining operations. Notable legislation for the mining industry includes the 1997 Mineral Policy, the 1998 Mineral Act and the 2010 Mineral Act. The latest piece of legislation granted the mining company a higher percentage of royalties on gold and base metals, rough diamonds, colored gemstones, uranium and other minerals; made it mandatory for mining companies to be listed on the stock exchange and gave the government a stake in all new mining projects. Tanzania has accepted the Kimberley Process Certification Scheme.

Tanzania's president, John Magufuli, imposed new laws on the mining industry in 2017, including higher taxes on mineral exports and allowing the government to have a higher stake in some mining operations. These laws have been slowing investment in the sector.

== Commodities ==
The mining industry makes a significant contribution to the Tanzanian economy, mainly through the extraction of copper, gold, and silver, along with some industrial minerals and gemstones such as diamonds. International mining companies dominate the industry in the extraction of gold and diamonds, with additional small scale mining operations scattered across the country.

Tanzania is the fourth-largest gold miner in Africa behind South Africa, Mali, and Ghana, and in 2010 accounted for 2% of the world's gold output. The fuel mineral under extraction is natural gas. Tanzanite is an exclusive product of the country.

== Mines ==
- Manyoni mine (Uranium)

== See also ==
- List of gold mines in Tanzania
