= John L. Thornton =

American businessman (born 1954)

John Lawson Thornton
- Born: January 2, 1954 (age 72)
- Education: Hotchkiss School
- Alma mater: Harvard University (AB); St John's College, Oxford (MA); Yale University (MPPM)

John Lawson Thornton (born January 2, 1954) is an American businessman and professor and director of the Global Leadership Program at Tsinghua University in Beijing. He is also chairman of Barrick Gold Corporation, chairman of RedBird Capital Partners and non-executive chairman of PineBridge Investments. Thornton stepped down as co-president of Goldman Sachs in 2003.

== Early life and education ==
Thornton is the son of John V. Thornton, former vice chairman of the Consolidated Edison Company, and Edna Lawson Thornton, a lawyer. He attended the Hotchkiss School, and later served as President of the school's board of trustees.

Thornton received a Bachelor of Arts in history from Harvard College in 1976, a Bachelor of Arts in jurisprudence (promoted by seniority to Master of Arts) from St John's College, Oxford in 1978, which qualified him as a lawyer, and a master's degree in public and private management (MPPM) from the Yale School of Management in 1980. He was awarded an honorary doctorate from the Bank Street College of Education in 2003. Thornton was fellow of the American Academy of Arts and Sciences in 2007 and an honorary fellow of St. John's College, Oxford University in 2009.

== Career ==
Thornton joined Goldman Sachs in 1980. In 1983, he founded Goldman Sachs' European mergers and acquisitions business. He served as co-CEO of Goldman Sachs International in London from 1995 to 1996. Thornton was Chairman of Goldman Sachs Asia from 1996 to 1998, where he expanded the firm's regional franchise during the 1997 Asian financial crisis. He became co-president of Goldman Sachs in 1999. When then-CEO Henry Paulson delayed his retirement and Thornton's expected promotion, Thornton left Goldman Sachs in 2003 and became a professor at Tsinghua University in Beijing. Thornton is the first non-Chinese full professor at Tsinghua University since 1999, although he did not speak any Chinese languages at the time of his appointment. The New York Times reported that Thornton's Goldman exit “was not met with resistance from senior management”.

Thornton was non-executive chairman at Laura Ashley, the British fashion retailer, between 1995 and 2002.

Thornton joined the board of directors for Ford Motor Company in 1996. William Clay Ford, Jr. – then CEO and chairman at Ford – had been friends with Thornton since their prep school days together at The Hotchkiss School. Their personal ties came under "sharp scrutiny" when Ford, Jr. received 400,000 shares in Goldman Sachs's 1999 IPO, the largest individual award of that IPO by a large margin. In 2002, an escalating series of investigations and congressional hearings revealed that Goldman Sachs had "spun hot IPO shares to preferred clients", mostly CEOs, as "an inducement to win investment banking business" from those clients. Goldman Sachs collected $87 million in investment fees from Ford Motor Company between 1996 and 2002. A board ethics whistleblower described Goldman's role in the bank's activities with Ford as being "the umpire and pitcher in the same game". Thornton remains a member of Ford's compensation, finance and nominating and governance committees and is the longest serving independent director of Ford. Thornton played a significant role in helping Ford survive the COVID-19 recession.

In 2005, Thornton became the founding chairman of the Nelson Mandela Legacy Trust in the United States.

In December 2008, Thornton became a board member at HSBC and stepped down in 2013. Thornton has also served on the boards of Intel, ICBC, China Unicom, IMG, BSkyB, DirecTV, News Corp., and on the advisory board of McKinsey.

Thornton was appointed to the board of Barrick Gold in May 2012 and became Executive Chairman of Barrick Gold in 2014. In May 2017, the government of Tanzania accused Acacia Mining, a subsidiary of Barrick Gold, of "under-reporting its gold exports by a factor of ten". The investigation revealed that copper and silver were also under-reported, and sulfur, iron, iridium, titanium and zinc were present, but not accounted for. The Tanzanian government then imposed a ban on the export of gold and copper concentrates. The accusation and ban halved Acacia's market value. In October 2017, Thornton met with John Magufuli, then president of Tanzania, for six hours, emerging with a preliminary deal that included a $300 million payment for back taxes from Acacia to the Tanzanian government, as well as the Tanzanian government taking a 16% stake in Acacia's mines. Thornton reportedly did not tell Acacia the terms of the proposal until after the deal was announced, even though Acacia, not Barrick, would be responsible for the payment. Shortly after Thornton's deal with Magufuli was announced, Acacia's top executives – CEO Brad Gordon, CFO Andrew Wray and COO Mark Morcombe, under whose tenure relations with the Tanzanian government had deteriorated – resigned. The resolution allowed Acacia and Barrick to resume operations in Tanzania. In January 2020, Barrick formalized a joint venture with the Tanzanian government covering the North Mata, Bulyanhulu and Buzwagi mines.

On September 24, 2018, Barrick Gold announced plans to acquire London-listed Randgold Resources in a transformational deal valued at more than $6.5 billion. The merger solidified Barrick's position as one of the world's largest gold mining companies, with proven and probable reserves of 78 million ounces of gold and dominant land positions in many of the world's major gold producing regions. Thornton led the all-stock, nil-premium merger, which earned the support of more than 95% of the shareholders of both companies.

In February 2019, Barrick Gold announced a hostile $19 billion bid to acquire Newmont Mining Corporation, an American company based in Denver, Colorado. Newmont's board unanimously rejected the offer, describing Barrick's "egocentric proposal" as "designed to transfer value from Newmont shareholders to Barrick's". Newmont CEO Gary Goldberg said, "[O]ne of the major factors that hindered Barrick's ability to create value in the past remains the same... John Thornton is still firmly in control." Newmont later reversed this position and agreed to enter into a joint venture with Barrick in Nevada.

In August 2020, Warren Buffett's Berkshire Hathaway disclosed that it had purchased 20.9 million shares of Barrick Gold, a position valued at $563.5 million by the end of the second quarter of 2020. Just three months later in February 2021, Berkshire Hathaway sold its entire Barrick Gold stake.

In 2023, Thornton joined RedBird Capital Partners, an investment firm with over $10 billion in assets under management, as chairman. In the same year, Thornton was also appointed to the board of computer manufacturer Lenovo, as an independent non-executive director.

Thornton currently serves as Chair Emeritus of the Brookings Institution and co-chair of the Asia Society. In addition to these academic and research affiliations, Thornton has also authored forewords for three books, including "Social Ethics in a Changing China", "China in 2020" and "Democracy is a Good Thing".

== Interest in China ==
Thornton's interest in China stretches to at least November 1997, when Goldman Sachs assisted China Telecom with its $4.2 billion IPO, one of the first international listings of a Chinese state-owned company. By the time Thornton left his position at Goldman, the bank had become the lead underwriter for major Chinese state-owned companies.

Thornton joined the board of trustees of the Brookings Institution in May 2000, and became chairman in June 2003. Brookings established the John L. Thornton China Center in 2006 with an initial $12.5 million donation from John Thornton. The center has offices in Washington D.C. and Beijing and provides recommendations to decision-makers in China and the West. In November 2018, Thornton stepped down as board chair and became chair emeritus.

In 2009, Thornton became an inaugural member of the International Advisory Council of the Chinese sovereign wealth fund China Investment Corporation. He is also listed as chairman of the Board of the Silk Road Finance Corporation.

Thornton was a senior consultant for the Confucius Institute.

Thornton was an original member of the Schwarzman Scholars board of trustees, founded in 2013 by Stephen A. Schwarzman. Thornton's son, J. R. Thornton, was named a Schwarzman Scholar in 2017.

In September 2017, Thornton helped arrange a meeting between Steve Bannon and Wang Qishan, Thornton's friend and former head of the China Construction Bank and former member of the CCP Politburo Standing Committee, at the Chinese Communist Party (CCP)'s Zhongnanhai headquarters a few weeks after Bannon was forced out of his advisory role in President Donald Trump's first administration. Bannon, also a former Goldman employee, has described Thornton as a friend and mentor.

Thornton, alongside Secretary of Treasury, Steve Mnuchin, and US Trade Representative Ambassador Robert Lighthizer, served as one of the architects of Phase I of the US-China trade deal. US President Donald Trump's ally and Palm Beach neighbor, Thornton has represented the United States during the trade war escalations of Trump's four-year term, including in a closed-door meeting in 2018 with Vice-Premier Liu He and the international advisory board of China's sovereign wealth fund.

In 2025, Thornton's relationship with Cai Qi, director of the CCP General Office, came into scrutiny with RedBird's proposed purchase of The Daily Telegraph.

== Interest in Mongolia ==
Over his career, Thornton has built relationships with leaders of countries in which his current and former companies have conducted business. Some of these relationships include United States President Donald Trump, CCP General Secretary Xi Jinping, Australian Prime Minister Malcolm Turnbull, South African President Nelson Mandela, Mongolian President Nambaryn Enkhbayar, Congolese President Félix Tshisekedi and Tanzanian President John Magufuli. Thornton developed a friendship with Enkhbayar, who was arrested in April 2012 by Mongolia's anti-corruption commission after being accused of misuse of state property while in office. Thornton played a key role in a campaign led by Senator Dianne Feinstein (D-CA) to gain international support for Enkhbayar, who had been convicted by a government court in August 2012. Senator Feinstein took the position that due process of law had not been followed in Enkhbayar's trial. Enkhbayar was released and pardoned by the new President of Mongolia

== Recognition ==
In 2007, Institutional Investor named John Thornton one of forty individuals who have had the greatest influence in shaping global financial markets over the past forty years. He received the 2009 Intercollegiate Tennis Association (ITA) Achievement Award, which every year honors one past participant in collegiate tennis who has made unique contributions to society as well as achieving excellence in their careers.

Thornton appeared on the National Post's 2017 Power List of the most influential people shaping Canadian business. The newspaper noted Thornton has "overseen a massive overhaul at Toronto-based Barrick" following which the company "has shed billions of dollars of debt and generated excellent financial results."

In 2008, he was awarded the Friendship Award of the People's Republic of China, the highest honor accorded to a non-Chinese citizen. The Chinese government also named him as one of fifteen "foreign experts" who have made the most significant contribution to China's development over the past three decades.

== Personal life ==
Thornton is married to Margaret Bradham Thornton; they have four children.

In 2011, The Wall Street Journal reported on the vast water consumption of wealthy Palm Beach residents during exceptional drought conditions. Thornton was listed as a top-five water user, having consumed 8,698,492 US gallons (32,927,370 L) between June 2010 and May 2011. The average Palm Beach resident consumes 108,000 gallons per year.
