= Link Wilfley =

US international rugby union player (born 1979)

- Full name: Link Michael Wilfley
- Born: July 5, 1979 (age 47) Denver, CO, United States
- Height: 6 ft 1 in (185 cm)
- Weight: 195 lb (88 kg)
- University: Oregon State University

Rugby union career
- Position: Utility back
International career
Years	Team	Apps	(Points)
2000–03	United States	20	(63)

Link Michael Wilfley (born July 5, 1979) is an American former rugby union international.

Born in Denver, Wilfley is the great-great-grandson of mining engineer Arthur Wilfley, who invented the Wilfley table.

Wilfley attended East High School in Denver and played varsity rugby union for Oregon State University, where he was also backup placekicker to José Cortez on the football team.

A utility back, Wilfley was best suited as a fly-half, but also played centre and fullback during his time with the national team, from 2000 to 2003. He was capped a total of 20 times, which included an appearance at the 2003 Rugby World Cup, coming on as a substitute against Scotland in Brisbane.

Wilfley played professional rugby union in England for Rotherham.

== See also ==
- List of United States national rugby union players
