= Tulawaka Gold Mine =

Mine in the Kagera Region of Tanzania

Tulawaka
- Location Tulawaka Gold Mine Tulawaka Gold Mine (Africa) Tulawaka Gold Mine (Earth)
- Location: Biharamulo,Kagera,Tanzania; 03°20′S 031°53′E
- Opened: 2005
- Closed: 7 March 2013
- Company: African Barrick Gold (70%); MDM Mines Ltd (30%)
- Website: ABG website MDM Mines website
- Acquired: 2000 (Barrick)

Tulawaka Gold Mine was a combined underground and open pit gold mine located in the Biharamulo district, in the Kagera Region of Tanzania. It is operated by African Barrick Gold, who owned 70% of the mine. The remaining 30% was owned by Explorations Minieres du Nord.

It was one of four gold mines African Barrick Gold, a subsidiary of Barrick Gold, owns in Tanzania, the other three being Bulyanhulu, Buzwagi and North Mara. The mine ceased operation in 2013.

== Description ==
Gold mining in Tanzania in modern times dates back to the German colonial period, beginning with gold discoveries near Lake Victoria in 1894. The first gold mine in what was then Tanganyika, the Sekenke Mine, began operation in 1909, and gold mining in Tanzania experienced a boom between 1930 and World War II. By 1967, gold production in the country had dropped to insignificance but was revived in the mid-1970s, when the gold price rose once more. In the late 1990s, foreign mining companies started investing in the exploration and development of gold deposits in Tanzania, leading to the opening of a number of new mines.

The original discovery of the deposit at the Tulawaka mine was in 1998 with Barrick acquiring the project, alongside Buzwagi, as part of its acquisition of Pangea Goldfields Inc. in 2000. African Barrick Gold assumed ownership of the mine in 2010. The Tulawaka mine operated from 2005 through to H1 2013 initially as an open pit operation, subsequently transitioning to an underground mine. Over that time the mine produced nearly 1Moz of gold, nearly double the original feasibility study estimates. The mine is now in the process of being closed which ultimately could involve the removal of all mine infrastructure and the environmental rehabilitation of the area. Discussions with the Tanzanian Government remain ongoing as to the final closure plan.
