= Knelson concentrator =

Mining equipment

A Knelson concentrator is a type of gravity concentration apparatus, predominantly used in the gold mining industry. It is used for the recovery of fine particles of free gold, meaning gold that does not require gold cyanidation for recovery.

== Operation ==
The machines utilise the principles of a centrifuge to enhance the gravitational force experienced by feed particles to effect separation based on particle density. The key components of the unit are a cone shaped "concentrate" bowl, rotated at high speed by an electric motor and a pressurized water jacket encompassing the bowl. Feed material, typically from a ball mill discharge or cyclone underflow bleed, is fed as a slurry toward the centre of the bowl from above. The feed slurry contacts the base plate of the vessel and, due to its rotation, is thrust outward. The outer extremities of the concentrate bowl house a series of ribs and between each pair of ribs is a groove. During operation the lighter material flows upward over the grooves and heavy mineral particles (usually of economic value) become trapped within them. Pressurized water is injected through a series of tangential water inlets along the perimeter of each groove to maintain a fluidized bed of particles in which heavy mineral particles can be efficiently concentrated. The Knelson concentrator typically operates as a batch process, with lighter gangue material being continuously discharged via overflow and a heavy mineral concentrate periodically removed by flushing the bowl with water.

== History ==
The first Knelson concentrator was developed by Byron Knelson in 1980.

== Mines ==
Knelson concentrators are used in a number of gold mines operated by AngloGold Ashanti, like Geita, Sunrise Dam and the Serra Grande Gold Mine as well as Barrick's TGO Tomingley Gold Operation Bulyanhulu Gold Mine.
