= Mimosa (disambiguation) =

Mimosa is a genus of about 400 species of herbs and shrubs, in the subfamily Mimosoideae of the legume family Fabaceae.

Mimosa or Mimosas may also refer to:

== Other species ==
- Acacia dealbata, sometimes known as mimosa, a species of Acacia
- Albizia julibrissin, sometimes known as mimosa in the U.S., a species of tree in the family Fabaceae
- Iolaus mimosae, the mimosa sapphire butterfly
- Neurostrota gunniella, the mimosa stem-mining moth
- Homadaula anisocentra, also known as the mimosa webworm, a moth
- Pyrisitia nise, the mimosa yellow butterfly

== Arts, entertainment and media ==
- Mimosa (album), by Fun Lovin' Criminals, 1999
- Mimosas (film), a 2016 drama film
- Mimosa (magazine), a science fiction fanzine
- Mimosa (magician) (1960–2023), French humorous magician
- Mimosa (song), by Ayumi Hamasaki, 2025
- Mimosa, a fish in the American television series FishCenter Live
- Mimosa, a pseudonym of the author Mabel Cosgrove Wodehouse Pearse
- Mimosa: A True Story, a 2005 book by Amy Carmichael
- Mimosa Vermillion, a character in the manga series Black Clover
- "Mimosa", a composition by Herbie Hancock, from the 1963 album Inventions & Dimensions

== Businesses and organizations ==
- Mimosa (record label), a 1920s United Kingdom record label
- Mimosa, a brand of dairy products by the Portuguese company Lactogal

== Food and drink ==
- Deviled egg, or œuf mimosa
- Mimosa (cocktail), made of champagne and orange juice
- Mimosa salad, a festive Russian salad

== Places ==
- Mimosa, Queensland, a locality in the Central Highlands Region, Australia
- Mimosa, Tennessee, U.S.
- Mimosa, Erin, Ontario, Canada
- Mimosa mine, Zimbabwe

== Ships ==
- Mimosa (ship), a clipper ship that took the first Welsh settlers to Patagonia in 1865
- USS Mimosa (AN-26), an Aloe-class net laying ship

== Other uses ==
- Mimosa Jallow (born 1994), a Finnish swimmer
- Mimosa Willamo (born 1994), a Finnish actress
- Mimosa (star), the second-brightest object in the southern constellation of Crux
- ASEC Mimosas, a football club from Ivory Coast
- MIMOSA (Micromeasurements of Satellite Acceleration), a Czech microsatellite launched in 2003
- MIMOSA (Machinery Information Management Open Systems Alliance), part of the OpenO&M initiative

== See also ==
- Mimosa Rocks National Park, a national park in New South Wales, Australia
