= Lupa Gold Field =

Area of southwest Tanzania

Coordinates: 8.7186103°S 33.28281°E

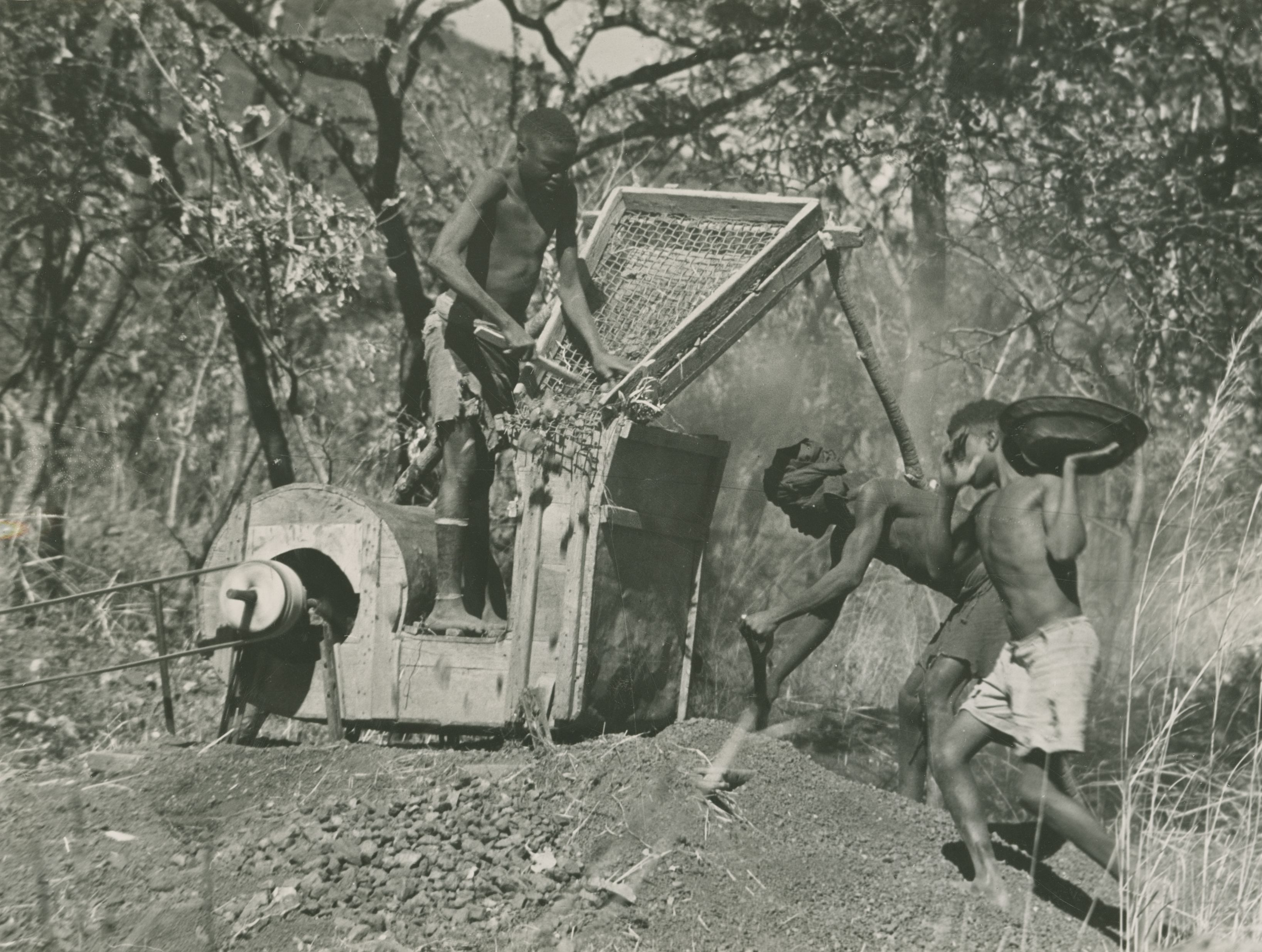
Selection of auriferous soils near the Lupa River in 1951

The Lupa Gold Field is an area of about 2,600 square kilometres (1,000 sq mi) in south west Tanzania, north of Mbeya, that is known for its gold deposits. European mining is believed to have started after alluvial gold was found in water drawn from the Lupa River, near Lake Rukwa. Lode mining began in 1934 at Ntumbi and in 1939 at New Saza.

A number of new mines have opened in the field in recent years including New Luika Gold Mine, the principal mine of Shanta Gold.
