= Manyoni mine =

Uranium mine in Lindi, Tanzania

- Location: Lindi Region, Tanzania
- Products: uranium

The Manyoni mine is a large open pit mine located in the southern part of Tanzania in Lindi Region. Manyoni represents one of the largest uranium reserves in Tanzania having estimated reserves of 182.1 million tonnes of ore grading 0.025% uranium.

== See also ==
- Mining industry of Tanzania
