= Shanta Gold =

Tanzanian gold mining company

Shanta Gold Limited
- Industry: Mining
- Predecessor: Shanta Mining Company Limited
- Founded: 2001
- Headquarters: St Peter Port, Guernsey
- Area served: Tanzania
- Key people: Eric Zurrin (C.E.O)
- Products: Gold; Gold Exploration
- Revenue: ▼$95,705,000 (2015)
- Operating income: ▼ ($11,125,000) (2015)
- Net income: ▼ ($17,206,000) (2015)
- Number of employees: 1,045 (2015)
- Parent: Shanta Gold Holdings Limited
- Website: www.shantagold.com

Shanta Gold Limited is a gold mining company, registered in Guernsey in the Channel Islands but which operates in Tanzania. The company is listed on AIM on the London Stock Exchange (symbol: LON:SHG) and had a market capitalisation of £63.5M as of 18 September 2013. The Tanzanian offices are in Dar Es Salaam. Its bankers are UBS.

== Overview ==
Shanta Gold is incorporated in Guernsey and maintains an office in Saint Peter Port. Shanta's most important project is New Luika Gold Mine, in the Lupa Gold Field of south western Tanzania, which saw its first gold pour in August 2012. The company's mines are all currently in Tanzania but projects elsewhere in East Africa are envisaged. Shanta sub-contracts all aspects of the mining process in order to shorten the time taken for a new mine to become productive.

On 20 December 2023, Shanta Gold agreed to a £142 million buyout offer from Tanzania-based Saturn Resources, leading to the removal of its AIM listing.

== Production statistics ==
Year	Gold produced (oz)	Grade (g/t)	Average price (US$/oz)	Cash Cost per ounce (US$)	Notes
2014	84,028	5.78	1,289	742	
2015	81,873	4.73	1,163	757	
