= Wilfley table =

Table used to concentrate heavy minerals

Wilfley Table
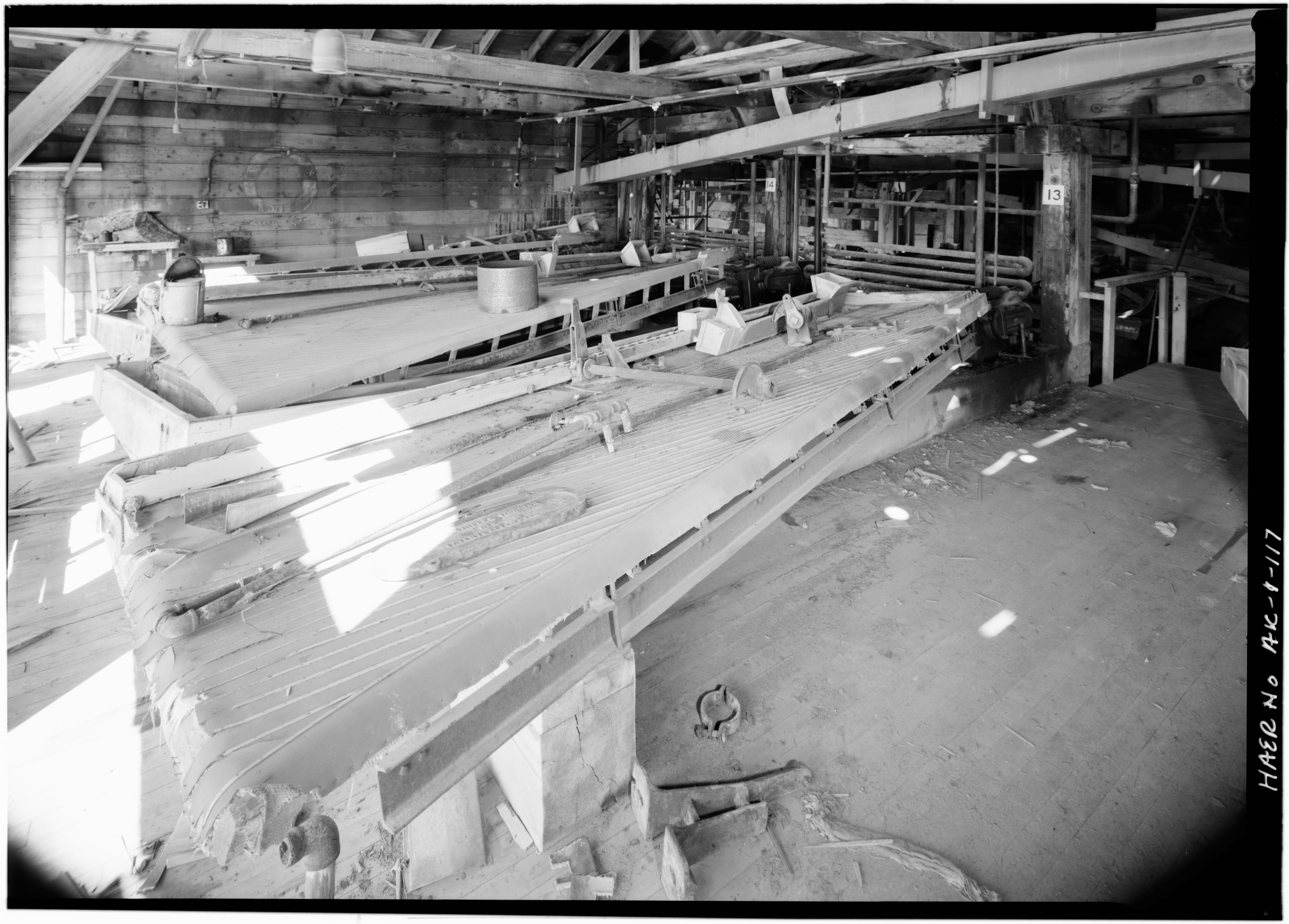
- Wilfley tables, Kennicott, Valdez-Cordova, Alaska
- Classification: Shaking table
- Industry: Mining, Mineral processing
- Application: Mineral separation and concentration
- Fuel source: Electric
- Powered: Yes
- Components: Shaking table, riffles, oscillating motor
- Inventor: Arthur Redman Wilfley
- Invented: 1896
- Other Names: Wet table, water table

The Wilfley Table is commonly used for the concentration of heavy minerals from the laboratory up to the industrial scale. It has a traditional shaking (oscillating) table design with a riffled deck. It is one of several brands of wet tables used for the separation and concentration of heavy ore minerals which include the Deister Table and Holman Table, all built to handle either coarse or fine feeds for mineral processing.

The Wilfley Table became a design used world-wide due to the fact it significantly increased the recovery of silver, gold and other precious metals. Such was the table's widespread use that it was included in Webster's Dictionary, and has been in constant use by miners and metallurgists since its invention.

== Origin ==
The Wilfley Table was conceived by Arthur Wilfley, a mining engineer based in Kokomo, Colorado in the United States. As a silver mine operator, Wilfley spent many years refining his separation table design in order to make the extraction of silver more economic. Rather than using heating processes (smelting) to concentrate the ore, Wilfley had been experimenting on mineral separation by use mineral density contrasts.

Wilfley was able to perfect a mechanical solution for the recovery of gold and silver from low-grade ores by means of the Wilfley table. The first Wilfley table was built on a preliminary scale in May 1895. The first full-sized table was used in Wilfley's own mill in Kokomo, in May 1896, while the first table sold for installation was placed in the Puzzle Mill, Breckinridge, Colorado, in August 1896. Patented in 1897, the Wilfley table made mining lower-grade ores profitable. Pulverised ore, suspended in a water solution, was washed across a sloping riffled vibrating table so that metals separated as they drained off.

The Wilfley Table was said to have revolutionised ore dressing worldwide and more than 25,000 were in service by the 1930s.

== Mineral separation ==
Oblique section of modern Wilfley (wet) table

The Wilfley Table was built to solve a problem common in the recovery of heavy ore minerals; approximately 90% of gold grains, platinum group minerals, sulphides, arsenides/antimonides and tellurides, in source rocks are silt-sized (<0.063 mm (0.0025 in)). Concentration of these minerals requires preconcentration techniques that include recovery of this fraction. Preconcentration may involve any number of methods including jigs, spirals, shaking tables, Knelson concentration, dense media separation, panning and hydroseparation. The Wilfley Table exploits preconcentration on the basis of density to separate minerals. It can recover silt to coarse sand-sized heavy minerals for a broad spectrum of commodities including diamonds, precious and base metals, and uranium.

=== Design and operation ===
The table, like most shaking tables, consists of a riffled deck with a gentle tilt on a stable support to counteract the table's oscillation. A motor, usually mounted to the side, drives a small arm that shakes the table along its length. The riffles are typically less than 10 mm (0.39 inches) high and cover more than half the table's surface. Varied riffle designs are available for specific applications. The riffles run longitudinally, parallel to the long dimension of the table. The table's shaking motion is parallel to the riffle pattern.

Deck construction varies from wood to hard-wearing fiberglass where the riffles are formed as part of the mold. The decks are lined with high coefficient-of-friction materials (linoleum, rubber or plastic), which assists in the mineral recovery process.

During operation, a slurry of <2 mm (0.079 inches) sample material consisting of about 25% solids by weight is fed with wash water along the top of the table, perpendicular to the direction of table motion. The table is shaken longitudinally, using a slow forward stroke and a rapid return strike that causes particles to migrate or crawl along the deck parallel to the direction of motion. Particles move diagonally across the deck from the feed end and separate on the table according to size and density. Water flow rate, table tilt angle and intensity of the shaking motion must be properly adjusted for effective mineral recovery.

The riffles cause mineral particles to stratify in the protected inter-riffle regions. The finest and heaviest particles are forced to the bottom and the coarsest and lightest particles remain at the top. Particle layers migrate across the riffles with addition of new slurry feed and continued water wash. The riffles are tapered and flatten (disappear) towards the concentrate end of the table. The taper of the riffles causes migrating particles of progressively finer size and higher density to be brought into contact with the flowing film of water that tops the riffles; lighter material is washed away as tailings and middlings. Final concentration takes place in the unriffled region at the end of the deck where the layer of material at this stage is usually only a few particles deep.

=== Efficiency ===
Wilfley table diagrams illustrating the distribution of tailings materials, middlings and concentrated ore

Mineral separation is hampered by several factors, with particle size being particularly important. As the slurry feed grainsize increases, the efficiency of separation tends to decrease. Separation efficiency is also affected by the stroke of the table (frequency and length); fine feed requires a higher speed and shorter stroke than a coarse feed. A frequency of 200 to 325 strokes per minute is typical.

When Wilfley tables were originally employed to rework tailing dumps, the tables were found to enhance mineral recovery by some 35–40% percent compared to existing processes, though this is not always the case.

Optimisation of table setup can have a significant impact on the recovery of ore. Using magnetite as a synthetic ore to test recovery on a Wilfley Table, Mackay et al. (2015) found that an optimised table setup (i.e. table inclination, wash-water flow rate, material feed rate, table speed, stroke amplitude, feed grade and feed density) increased magnetite recovery by a factor of 3.7.

The Wilfley table, like any wet table, is one of the most metallurgically efficient forms of gravity concentration, being used to treat the smaller, more difficult flow-streams, and to produce finished concentrates from the products of other forms of gravity system. Additional efficiencies are gained in the treatment of low grade feeds where two or even three decks are stacked one above the other allowing for continuous feeding.

=== Modern usage ===
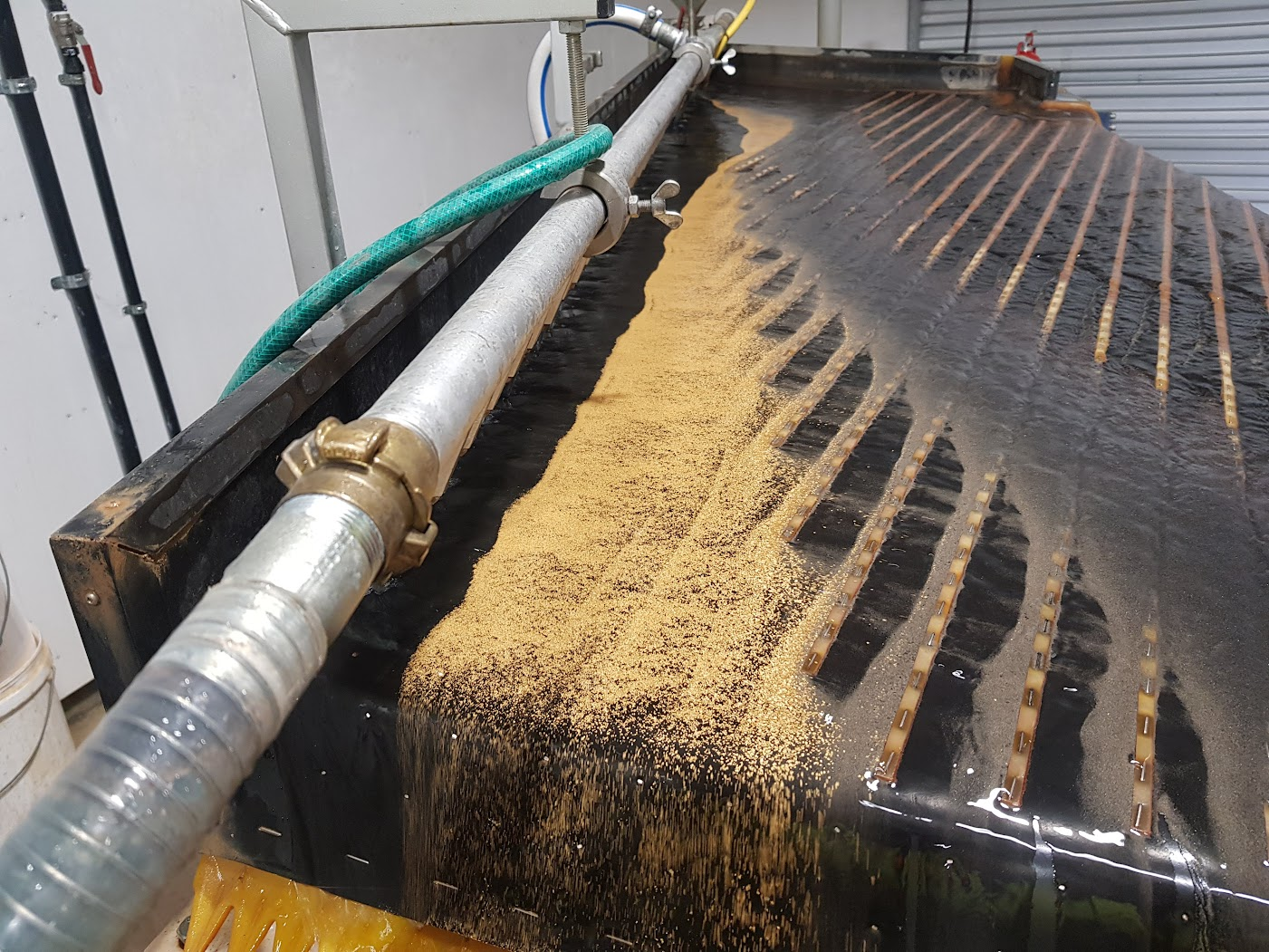
A small Holman-Wilfley 2000 table processing alluvial gold. The gold, middlings and tailings form discrete bands across the table

Modern applications of the Wilfley table (and other wet shaking tables) are predominantly observed in the following roles:

1. Laboratories. Small shaking tables are an excellent tool for see if a material will be responsive to gravity separation techniques
2. Gold rooms. Wilfley tables typically act as rougher tables on gravity gold concentrate ahead final concentration methods (e.g. panning)
3. High value heavy mineral concentrate cleaners. In mining, the vast majority of Wilfley-type tables are installed globally to concentrate (e.g.) tin, tungsten, tantalum, niobium, zircon, rutile, leucoxene, xenotime, monazite
4. Zircon finishing table – a specialist application

Tables are now also being used in the recycling of electronic scrap to recover precious metals.
