= New Luika Gold Mine =

Tanzanian gold mine

Luika Gold Mine
- Location in Tanzania
- Location: Chunya District, Mbeya, Tanzania; 08°43′S 033°17′E
- Production: 81,873 Oz. Gold
- Financial year: 2015
- Opened: 2012
- Company: Shanta Gold

The New Luika Gold Mine is an active mine in the Lupa Gold Field, an area of about 2,600 square kilometres (1,000 sq mi) in south west Tanzania, north of Mbeya, that is known for its gold deposits. It is the principal mine of Shanta Gold and saw its first gold pour in August 2012.

In September 2016 Shanta Gold reported that from its underground exploration efforts, the indicated gold deposits of the mine increased by 409% to 205,000 Oz. This is a big discovery for the company as the company expects to deplet the Luika surface mine by 2020.
