= Arthur Wilfley =

American mining engineer and inventor (1860–1927)

Arthur Redman Wilfley
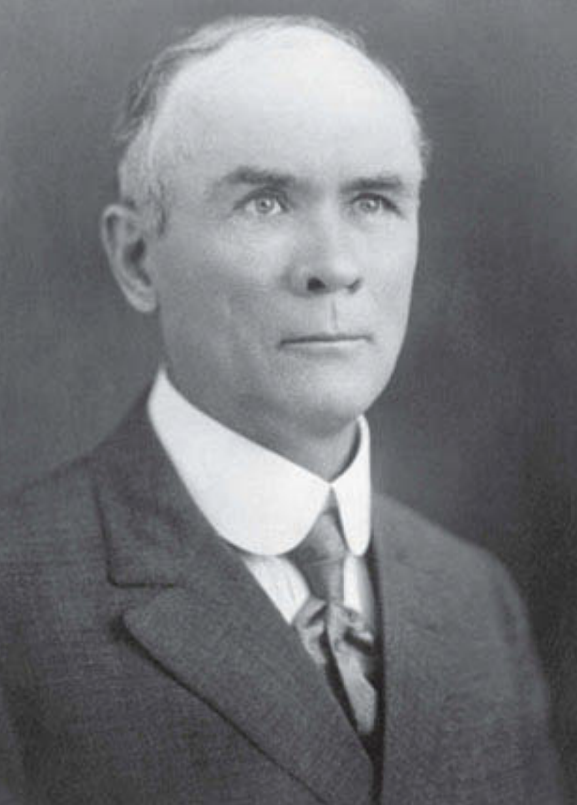
- Born: April 29, 1860; Maryville, Missouri, United States
- Died: February 20, 1927 (aged 66); Whittier, California, United States
- Resting place: Fairmount Cemetery, Denver, Colorado, United States
- Known for: Wilfley table, Wilfley centrifugal pump
- Scientific career
- Fields: Engineer, inventor, manufacturer, mill operator, surveyor, mine operator, mine developer, smelter operator

Arthur Redman Wilfley (April 29, 1860 – February 20, 1927) was a mining engineer and inventor who worked much of his life in Colorado, in the United States.

Wilfley invented the Wilfley table, an oscillating mineral separation table that concentrated heavy ore minerals via a series of longitudinal riffles. The Wilfley Table was a design used world-wide due to the fact it significantly increased the recovery of silver, gold and other precious metals. Wilfley then turned his attention to centrifugal pumps knowing the market for a device that could handle heavy tailings at many mills was greatly sought. This concept gave rise to a unique centrifugal seal and the subsequent birth of the Wilfley Packingless Pump. Like the Wilfley Table, the Wilfley Pump gained international recognition for it reliability in handling sands, slurries, and limes. It would form the basis for the creation of Wilfley's company, A. R. Wilfley and Sons, Inc.

== Early life ==
Arthur Wilfley was born on April 29, 1860, in Maryville, Missouri, United States, the son of an unsuccessful forty-niner. At age eighteen, he and his family moved to Kokomo (now a ghost town) near Leadville, Colorado, where they intended to open a mill to supply lumber for gold rush towns.

Though he possessed little formal education, he took work as an assistant mineral surveyor to help pay for his grade-school education, learning assaying from a chemist and studying books on mining engineering in his evenings. Qualifying as a United States deputy mineral surveyor in 1883, he went into partnership as an engineer with his employer.

== Mining career and inventions ==
As a teenager in Kokomo during the gold and silver rush, Wilfley had been challenged by the hard-to-reclaim sulfide ores in the area. As the prosperity of Kokomo waned, Wilfley remained in the town long after many others had left as recoverable silver began to be played-out by 1884. In 1887 he leased a claim in Kokomo, building a smelter which he continued to work while developing technology to aid in the separation of silver from sulphides. Acquisition of further silver mines and a focus on heat separation of silver via application of the Austin process proved successful in 1892, until the issues with zinc and falling silver prices set-in within a year.

=== Concentrating table ===
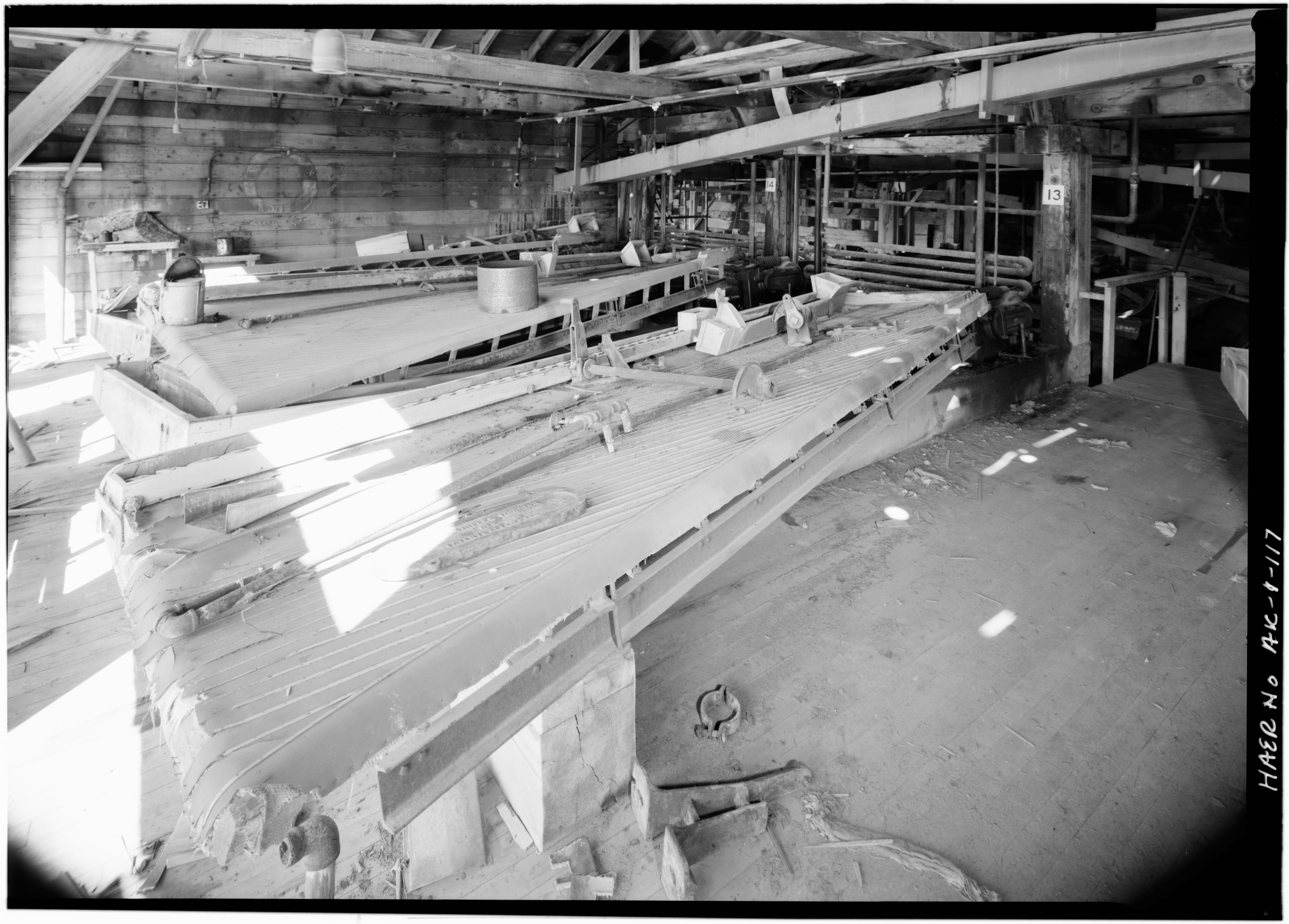
Wilfley tables from the Kennecott Copper Corporation, on Copper River and Northwestern Railroad, Kennicott, Valdez-Cordova Census Area, Alaska. July 1985

Tireless in his efforts to make the extraction of silver more economical, Wilfley continued to work on a new type of concentrator. Rather than using heat such as the Austin process, Wilfley had instead been experimenting for some time on mineral separation by use mineral density contrasts. By 1896 he had eventually been able to perfect a mechanical solution for the recovery of gold and silver from low-grade ores by means of the Wilfley Table. Patented in 1897, the Wilfley Table made mining lower-grade ores profitable. Pulverised ore, suspended in a water solution, was washed across a sloping riffled vibrating table so that metals separated as they drained off. When Wilfley tables were used to rework tailing dumps, the table enhanced mineral recovery by some 35–40% percent compared to existing processes.

The Wilfley Table was said to have revolutionised ore dressing worldwide and more than 25,000 were in service by the 1930s. The commercial success of his Wilfley Tables was unfortunately marred by 13 years of legal issues due to patent litigation, though the outcome for Wilfley was eventually favourable.

=== Centrifugal pumps ===
Wilfley began working on centrifugal pumps in 1902, knowing that dealing with heavy tailings was a considerable problem at many mills. With his son, Wilfley developed a centrifugal pump to transfer heavy, often abrasive slurries, with the ability to withstand corrosive solutions. His centrifugal pump, completed in 1913, became as successful as the Wilfley Table and by 1919 had led to the formation of his company, A. R. Wilfley and Sons. By 1924, three years before his death, Wilfley had a total of 24 patents and his name was listed in Webster's Dictionary in conjunction with the table he invented. Wilfley continued to perfect his pump's expeller design and received a patent in 1920. This would become another internationally successful invention and the crowning accomplishment of his inventive career.

== Biography ==
- Niebur, J. E. (1982). Arthur Redman Wilfley: Miner, Inventor, and Entrepreneur. Denver, CO, USA: Colorado Historical Society. p. 245. ISBN 0942576004.
