= Kirondatal Gold Mine =

Former gold mine in Tanzania

Kirondatal
- Location within Tanzania Location within Africa
- Location: Shinyanga, Tanzania; 03°57′S 034°15′E
- Production: inactive
- Financial year: 2009
- Opened: 1934
- Closed: 1950
- Company: Barrick Gold

The Kirondatal Gold Mine (German: Kirondathal, "Kironda Valley") was a gold mine in the Singida Region of Tanzania.

The mine closed in 1950 and exploration rights in the area of the old mine now lay with Barrick Gold, through its subsidiary, Sekenke Exploration Limited, while the wider area around the mine is under exploration by Currie Rose Resources Inc.

== History ==
Gold mining in Tanzania in modern times dates back to the German colonial period, beginning with gold discoveries near Lake Victoria in 1894. Gold mining at Kirondatal however is said to predate this era, having been carried out by Arab traders in pre-colonial times.

The nearby Sekenke Gold Mine became the first gold mine in Tanganyika, when it began operation in 1909, after gold having been discovered there in 1907. Kirondatal was opened considerably later, in 1930. While Sekenke became the largest single producer of gold when gold mining in the country experienced a boom between 1930 and the Second World War, the Kirondatal mine, active from 1934 to 1950, produced just 7,267 ounces of gold. The Kirondatal mine closed in 1950, having produced an average grade of 9.0 g/t of gold in its 16 years of operation.

By 1967, gold production in Tanzania had dropped to insignificance but was revived in the mid-1970s, when the gold price rose once more. In the late 1990s, foreign mining companies started investing in the exploration and development of gold deposits in Tanzania, leading to the opening of a number of new mines. Kirondatal however was not reopened.
