= Geita Gold Mine =

Open pit gold mine in Tanzania

Geita
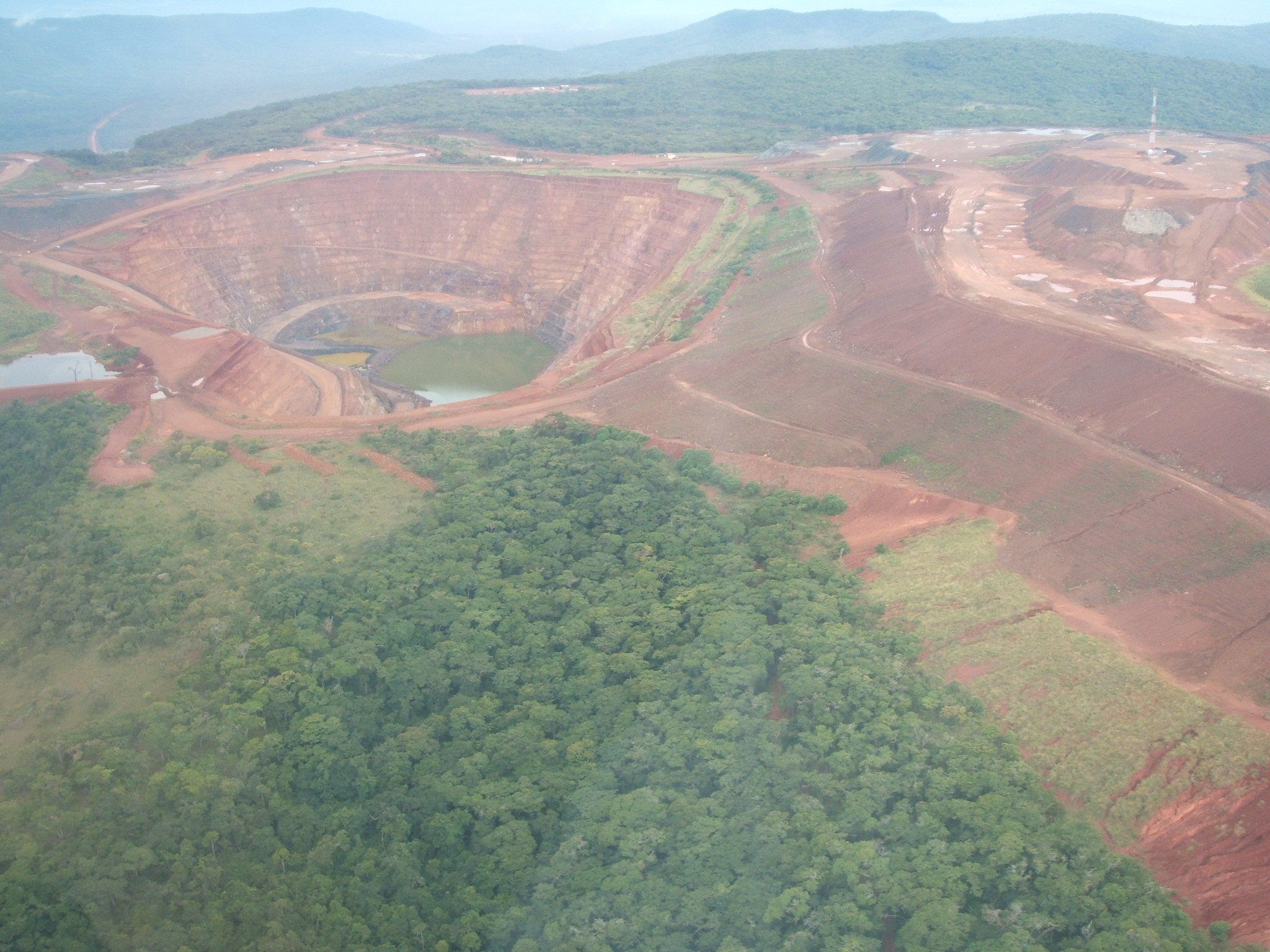
- Geita open pit mine

- Location of Geita Gold Mine Geita Gold Mine (Africa) Geita Gold Mine (Earth)
- Location: Geita, Mwanza, Tanzania; 02°50′S 032°18′E
- Production: 272,000
- Financial year: 2009
- Opened: 2000
- Company: AngloGold Ashanti
- Website: AngloGold Ashanti website

The Geita Gold Mine is an open pit gold mine located in the Geita District of the Geita Region (formerly part of the Mwanza Region) of Tanzania. It is operated by AngloGold Ashanti.

In 2008, the mine accounted for 6% of the company's overall annual gold production and employed close to 3,200 staff.

== Early development (1930s) ==
Gold mining in Tanzania in modern times dates to the German colonial period, beginning with gold discoveries near Lake Victoria in 1894. The first gold mine in what was then German East Africa, the Sekenke Gold Mine, began operation in 1909, and gold mining in Tanzania experienced a boom between 1930 and World War II.

In 1898, a German prospector found gold mineralization in the Geita area. Plans for a gold mine in the region were disrupted by World War I. The Treaty of Versailles granted Tanzania, then part of German East Africa to Britain.

In the 1930s Tanganyika Concessions learned that gold prospectors were having success in the area near Mgusu, southwest of Lake Victoria, and in 1934 formed Kentan Gold Area Limited to develop these finds. It did so through its subsidiaries Saragura Development Company Limited and Geita Gold Mining Company Limited. The Geita Gold Mining Company was set up to operate the Geita Gold Mine in Tanganyika, which was transferred from the Sagura Development Company.

Production began in 1936. A 1937 report said it hoped to start crushing 500 tons per day, and could well become the largest gold producer in East Africa. The company built a road from the mine to Lake Victoria, where it built a jetty, housing, medical facilities, set up a private radio station and subsidised a weekly air service. Gold milling began in Geita in December 1938. Simultaneously, artisanal mining was made illegal during the British colonial period.

== Post-World War II (1945–1965) ==
After World War II, production was increased at Geita. By 1948, ore was recovered at three levels, processed in ball mills and gold recovered by the cyanide process. Ore was also recovered from a mine at Ridge Eight and carried 13 km to Geita by aerial ropeway. The General Manager and mine manager Art Sadler were Canadian; the company Secretary was Steve Charlton and the chief accountant Mildred Hayward. The company employed about 20 European specialists and 300 African miners. Electricity was provided by a wood gasification plant feeding a Crossley engine giving 2 megawatt capacity. Gold was smelted and shipped monthly by road to Mwanza; in the rainy season the road became impassable and a DH Dragon was charted to collect the ingots from a rudimentary airstrip for transport to Dar es Salaam. Two prospectors were employed and ore samples assayed continuously by the lead/silver/acid process, A level of 9.3 grams per ton was considered the minimum economical level for recovery. In 1951 an 200 mm (8 in) pipeline was laid to bring water 24 km (15 mi) from Lake Victoria.

In the early 1950s, Geita employed about 2,000 men and produced more than half of the gold mined in Tanganyika, although this was much less than the peak production before World War II (1939–1945). Geita struggled with financial problems until it closed in 1965, and seems to have been a net liability to TCL. The mine produced over 31 tonnes (1,000,000 ozt) of gold between 1936 and 1966.

By 1967, gold production in the country had dropped to insignificance but was revived in the mid-1970s, when the gold price rose once more. In the late 1990s, foreign mining companies started investing in the exploration and development of gold deposits in Tanzania, leading to the opening of a number of new mines.

The British banned artisanal mining in 1938 and it continued until 1979 despite Tanzania's independence in 1971. With the country's economic problems and international rise in gold prices, the postcolonial government lifted the ban in 1979.

== Revival (2000 to present) ==
The Geita mine re-commenced production in 2000, initially as a joint venture of AngloGold and Ashanti. With the merger of the two companies in 2004, the mine became fully owned by AngloGold Ashanti. The mine was inaugurated by then-Tanzanian President Benjamin Mkapa, who pledged more incentives for investments in the sector. But the opening of the mine also raised fears within environmentalists from Tanzania and Uganda that its proximity to Lake Victoria 20 kilometres away, could cause further environmental damage to the water system. Unlike the North Mara Gold Mine, where a spill caused extremely high levels of arsenic, cadmium, cobalt, copper, chrome, nickel and zinc in the nearby area, at Geita the situation was found to be less acute. But at Geita, higher than natural levels of arsenic and other metals in sediments were found.

The mine experienced production difficulties from 2007 onwards, with the failure of the highwall in the Nyankanga open pit, and continued with significant breakdowns of major mining equipment and in the processing plant. Geita continued to underperform in 2009, producing 2,200 kilograms (72,000 ozt) of gold for the year, 1,300 kilograms (43,000 ozt) short of the anticipated 9,800 kilograms (315,000 ozt).

In March 2010, a gang of robbers stormed into the mine, tied up a security guard, seized his gun and stole 14 boxes of explosives. The police later managed to arrest one of the gang members and retrieved 12 of the 14 boxes but the incident raised questions regarding security at the mine.

At the end of September 2012, Charles Kitwanga, the deputy minister to the vice president’s office singled out the mine for its environmental efforts, citing it as a great example of how mines do not go hand in hand with pollution. As of 2021 it was owned and operated by AngloGold Ashanti.

== Production ==
Production figures of the recent past were:

Year	Production	Grade	Cash Cost per ounce
2003	2.2 tonnes (72,000 ozt)	3.60 g/t	US$ 183
2004	18 tonnes (570,000 ozt)	3.74 g/t	US$250
2005	19.1 tonnes (613,000 ozt)	3.14 g/t	US$298
2006	9.6 tonnes (308,000 ozt)	1.68 g/t	US$497
2007	10.2 tonnes (327,000 ozt)	2.01 g/t	US$452
2008	8.2 tonnes (264,000 ozt)	1.92 g/t	US$728
2009	8.5 tonnes (272,000 ozt)	1.89 g/t	US$954
2010	11.1 tonnes (357,000 ozt)	2.36 g/t	US$777
2011	15.4 tonnes (494,000 ozt)	3.98 g/t	US$536
2012			
2013			
2014			

== Local facilities ==
The 1960s airstrip, as at 2023, is known as Geita-Mchauru and has the ICAO code HTRU. The company maintains a school of around 25 pupils which was founded in 2001, the Geita Gold International School. There is also a golf club adjacent to the mine.

== Sources ==
- Bryceson, Deborah Fahy; Fisher, Eleanor; Jønsson, Jesper Bosse; Mwaipopo, Rosemarie (2013), Mining and Social Transformation in Africa: Mineralizing and Democratizing Trends in Artisanal Production, Routledge, ISBN 978-1-135-05198-3
- GB Colonial Office (1937), Tanganyika Under United Kingdom Administration: Report by Her Majesty's Government in the United Kingdom of Great Britain and Northern Ireland to the General Assembly of the United Nations, H.M. Stationery Office
- "Geita Mine", Mindat
- Roberts, A. D. (October 1986), "The Gold Boom of the 1930s in Eastern Africa", African Affairs, 85 (341), Oxford University Press on behalf of The Royal African Society: 545–562, JSTOR 722296
