= Handeni mine =

Coordinates: 5.4454°S 38.02776°E

- Interactive map of Handeni mine
- Location: Tanga Region, Tanzania
- Products: Gold

The Handeni mine located in Handeni District of Tanga Region is one of the largest gold mines in the Tanzania and in the world. The mine is located in the north-east of the country in Tanga Region. The mine has estimated reserves of 3.94 million oz of gold.
