= Nkomati mine =

- Location: Machadodorp (Nkangala District Municipality), Mpumalanga, South Africa
- Products: Nickel
- Company: African Rainbow Minerals

The Nkomati mine is a polymetallic mine in Mpumalanga province, the north-east of South Africa. It is located 300 km east of Johannesburg, between the Waterval Boven, Machadodorp and Badplaas. Nkomati is under care and maintenance. It had been the only primary producer of Nickel in South Africa and represents one of the largest nickel reserves in South Africa having estimated reserves of 408.6 million tonnes of ore grading 0.33% nickel. The 408.6 million tonnes of ore contains 1.35 million tonnes of nickel metal.

== Geology ==
The Nkomati deposit is part of the Uitkomst Complex, a Palaeoproterozoic intrusion approximately 2.05 billion years old. It is considered a satellite body of the Bushveld Igneous Complex. The complex is a tubular body approximately 9 kilometers long and 1 kilometer wide, with a maximum thickness of 800 meters. The intrusion dips at 4 degrees to the northwest.

== Ownership and history ==
Mining in the area began with gold prospecting at the Little Mamre farm. In the early 1990s, Anglovaal (Avmin) identified the massive sulphide lenses.

In 2004, African Rainbow Minerals (ARM) acquired the stake held by Anglo American. A 50/50 joint venture was formed with LionOre in 2005. In 2007, Nornickel acquired LionOre and assumed the 50% stake in the Nkomati JV. In November 2023, ARM and Nornickel signed an agreement for ARM to purchase Nornickel's interest. As part of the transaction, ARM assumed all environmental liabilities. The sale was finalized in July 2025.

== Operations ==
The underground mine used trackless mobile machinery. Bord and pillar and longhole open stoping methods were utilized. A backfill plant was used to reach extraction rates of approximately 98%. Surface operations utilized three open pits and a truck-and-shovel configuration. Underground production was placed on care and maintenance in 2015, and open-pit mining ceased in February 2021.

The mine operated two concentrators. The MMZ (Main Mineralized Zone) Concentrator has an installed capacity of 375,000 tonnes per month. It uses a fully autogenous (FAG) primary mill and secondary ball mill. The PCMZ (Peridotitic Chromititic Mineralized zone) Concentrator has an produced 300,000 tonnes per month. The target is a finer grind size of 80% passing 75 microns due to the sensitive nature of the plant performance to grind size. It includes a spiral plant for chrome recovery.

== Community contribution ==
The Nkomati mine project has funded several local economic development projects in the Mpumalanga region. These include:

- Refurbishment of the Badplaas Water Treatment Works, a cost of R4 million.
- The Tjakastad Maths and Science Centre at a cost of R400,000.
- The Chief Dlamini Pavilion.
