= Nyanzaga mine =

Gold mine in Tanzania

- Location: Mwanza Region, Tanzania
- Products: Gold

The Nyanzaga mine is one of the largest gold mines in the Tanzania and in the world. The mine is located in the north-west of the country in Mwanza Region. The mine has estimated reserves of 4.2 million oz of gold.
