= Mimosa mine =

Platinum mine in Zimbabwe

- Location within Zimbabwe
- Location: Midlands Province, Zimbabwe; 20°19′40.44″S 29°49′31.08″E
- Products: platinum

The Mimosa mine is a large underground mine located in the southern part of Zimbabwe in Bannockburn near Dadaya in the Midlands Province. Mimosa was the first platinum mine in the Great Dyke of Zimbabwe. It had, as of 2012, platinum reserves estimated at 7.9 million ozs of platinum. The mine produces around 120,000 oz of platinum/year.

== History ==
1. 1926 – 60oz extracted from oxides. 2. 1966 – 2 vertical shafts sunk – trial mining – 40 000 t processed. 3. 1971 – Operations suspended. 4. 1975 – Blore Shaft established – 90 000 t processed. 5. 1978 – Operations suspended. 6. 1990 – Bulk sample to Mintek for test work. 7. 1990/94 – Reserve estimates and feasibility studies completed. 8. 1995 – Current operations started @ 212tpd. 9. 2003 – Current process – 4050tpd.

== Ownership ==
Mimosa is wholly owned by Mimosa Investments Limited, a Mauritius-based company jointly held by Implats and Sibanye-Stillwater in a 50:50 joint-venture.

== Geology ==
The Mimosa Mine is located on the Wedza Geological Complex in the Zimbabwean Great Dyke east of Bulawayo.

== Expansion summary ==
1. Capital cost US$38.1million 2. Funding – US$30 million Implats equity – Operational flows 3. Mill commission – Nov 2002 4. Full mill throughput – Jan 2003 5. Full mining tonnage – Sept 2003 6. US$80 million Tailings Storage Facility (TSF 4) - May 2024

== Mineral processing ==
1. Design from Mintek test work and past operations 2. 3 stage crushing 2MF circuit 4e recoveries – 80.6% 3. Produce final concentrate 4. Road transport concentrate to Implats 5. Long-term concentrate off take agreement
