= Acacia Mining =

Gold mining business

- Industry: Gold mining
- Founded: 2000
- Headquarters: London, United Kingdom
- Key people: Kelvin Dushnisky, Chairman; Bradley Gordon, CEO
- Revenue: US$663.8 million (2018)
- Operating income: US$108.6 million (2018)
- Net income: US$58.9 million (2018)
- Website: www.acaciamining.com

Acacia Mining (formerly African Barrick Gold plc) is a gold mining business operating in Tanzania, with exploration properties in Kenya, Burkina Faso and Mali. It is listed on the London Stock Exchange and the Dar es Salaam Stock Exchange and is a constituent of the FTSE 250 Index until it was re-acquired by Barrick Gold in September 2019.

== History ==
The business was established as a unit of Barrick Gold when that company started mining in Tanzania in 2000. Barrick's involvement in Tanzania had begun the previous year, when the company purchased the Bulyanhulu property as part of its acquisition of Sutton Resources Ltd. Barrick then acquired Buzwagi and Tulawaka as part of its acquisition of Pangea Goldfields Inc. in 2000. Finally, in 2006, Barrick acquired North Mara, when it took over Placer Dome. The company was floated off by Barrick Gold and first listed on the London Stock Exchange as African Barrick Gold in 2010. The company changed its name to Acacia Mining on 27 November 2014 but was re-acquired by Barrick Gold in September 2019.

== Operations ==
The Company operates three mines in northwest Tanzania—Bulyanhulu, Buzwagi and North Mara.

=== Bulyanhulu Gold Mine ===
The Bulyanhulu Gold Mine is an underground gold mine in the Shinyanga Region of Tanzania, located 55 kilometres south of Lake Victoria. Barrick acquired the project in 1999 when it purchased Sutton Resources and the mine opened in 2001. The opening of Bulyanhulu, Tanzania's deepest mine, made Tanzania the third largest producer of gold in Africa.

=== Buzwagi Gold Mine ===
The Buzwagi Gold Mine is an open pit gold mine in the Shinyanga Region of Tanzania, located 6 kilometres southeast from the town of Kahama. The mine, which opened in 2009, is the second largest mining operation and the largest single open pit mine in Tanzania.

=== North Mara Gold Mine ===
The North Mara Gold Mine is an open pit gold mine in the Tarime District of the Mara Region of Tanzania. The mine, which opened in 2002, was acquired by Barrick through the takeover of Placer Dome in 2006.

== Mining Practices ==
Acacia Mining was fined $2.4 million in May 2019 for alleged pollution at its North Mara mine in Tanzania. Tanzania's National Environment Management Council issued an environmental protection order relating to pollution from the mine's tailings dam.

=== Human Rights Violations ===
Security guards hired by Acacia Mining have shot and killed 22 people at the North Mara gold mine since 2014, and injured 69 others. Tanzanian human rights groups estimate as many as 300 mine-related civilian deaths since the mine's opening in 1999. Acacia included only 17 civilian deaths at North Mara in their annual report in 2014, and six civilian deaths in the 2016 report. No Acacia security guards have been killed on duty. The Financial Times reported, “In 2015, without admitting liability, Acacia settled out of court for an undisclosed sum after a case was brought against it in the London High Court following an incident in which six people were allegedly killed by police hired by Acacia. The company admits to providing per diem expenses for the police at its mine”. The International Council of Jurists said, after a September 2017 visit to the North Mara mine, that they were “deeply concerned about the gravity of many of [the] allegations and the difficulties [victims] experienced in accessing any adequate remedy and reparation”.

Multiple women claim to have been raped at the North Mara gold mine. In July 2018, a 9-year-old girl was crushed and killed by a mine vehicle driven by the police as the driver took a short-cut. Afterward, four women who came to sit by the girl's body were injured by teargas canisters as the police sought to disperse the crowd. In June 2019, Acacia's grievance process at the North Mara mine was found to not comply with the United Nations Guiding Principles on Business and Human Rights, the international standard for corporations.

=== Corruption ===
Beginning in 2013, Acacia Mining reportedly bribed Tanzanian government officials, Adam Yusuf and Jerry Minja, and others responsible for valuing land near the North Mara gold mine that it wanted to buy. The alleged bribes totaled more than $400,000.00 and were paid in cash. Jerry Minja, a district land officer who received cash payment, stated that his agreement prevents him from commenting on the details of the arrangement. The Wall Street Journal reported that the original whistleblower intended to report the payments to the Foreign Corrupt Practices Act units of the United States Justice Department and the U.S. Securities and Exchange Commission. Tanzanian authorities charged three affiliates with conspiracy, organized crime, forgery, money laundering and corruption. The Wall Street Journal reported in 2018 that the British Serious Fraud Office had opened an investigation in Tanzania, despite insistence that the payments were legal.

=== Tax Evasion ===
In 2016, a Tanzanian government tribunal ruled that a “sophisticated scheme of tax evasion” was organized in Tanzania and fined Acacia Mining, as reported by Bloomberg, for under-declaring export revenues from the Bulyanhulu and Buzwagi mines since 2000. John L. Thornton told The Globe and Mail that “Acacia never paid a dime of income tax” to the Tanzanian government.

In May 2017, the government of Tanzania accused Acacia Mining of “underreporting its gold exports by a factor of ten”. The investigation revealed that Acacia declared the presence of gold, copper and silver in its mineral sand exports, but did not declare other precious metals. The committee found that the exports included amounts of undeclared sulfur, iron, iridium, titanium and zinc. The report stated that Acacia declared 1.1 tons of gold in a container that actually contained up to 15 tons of gold. The Tanzanian government then imposed a ban on the export of gold and copper concentrates. The accusation and ban halved Acacia's market value. In October 2017, Thornton met with John Magufuli, the president of Tanzania, for six hours, and negotiated a deal that included a $300 million payout from Acacia to the Tanzanian government, as well as the Tanzanian government taking a 16% stake in Acacia's mines. Thornton reportedly did not tell Acacia the terms of the settlement until after the deal was announced, even though Acacia would be responsible for the payment. Shortly after Thornton's deal with Magufuli was announced, Acacia's top executives – CEO Brad Gordon, CFO Andrew Wray and COO Mark Morcombe – resigned.

=== Canadian Journalists for Free Expression ===
In 2017, Canadian Journalists for Free Expression reported that journalists in Tanzania had been threatened and persecuted for reporting on Acacia mines.
