= Buzwagi Gold Mine =

Gold mine in Tanzania

Buzwagi
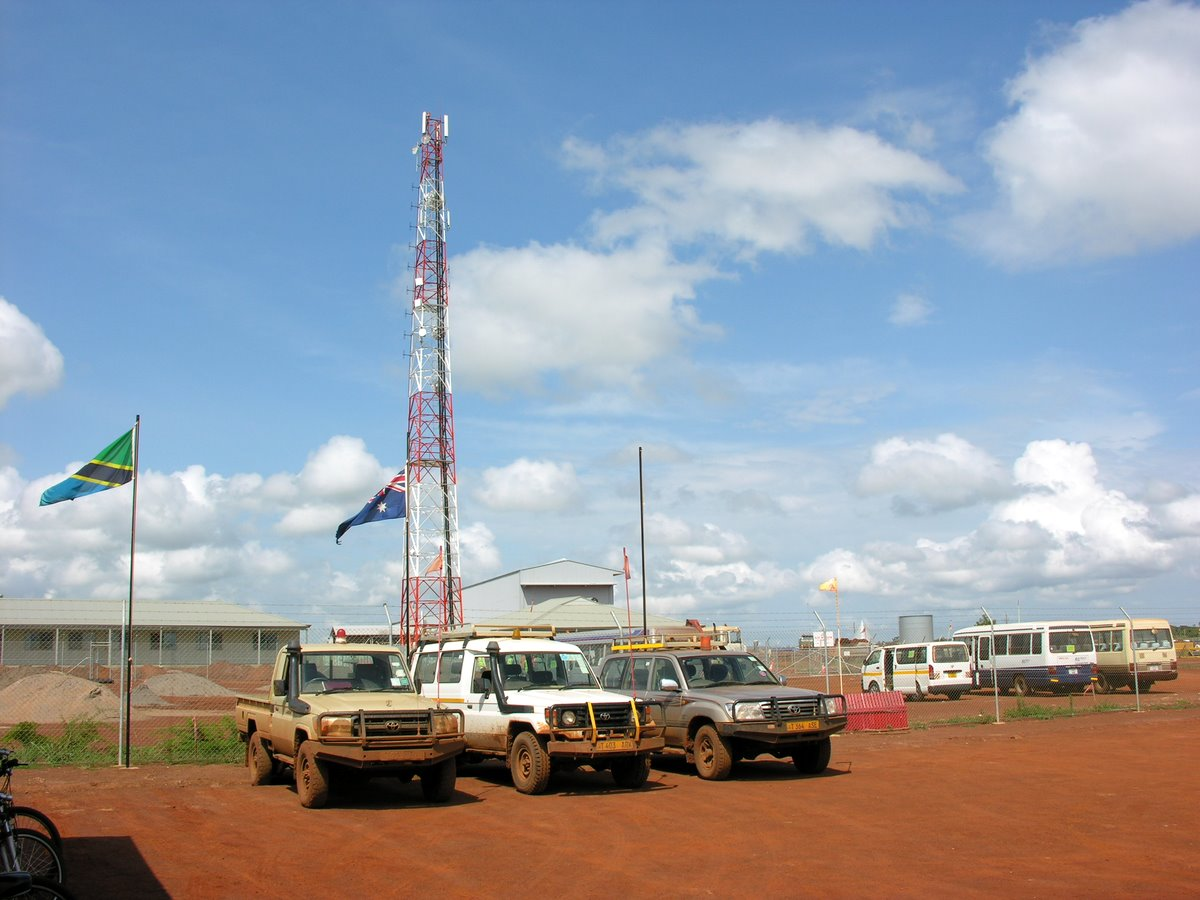

- Location of Buzwagi Gold Mine.

Location
- Location: Kahama, Shinyanga, Tanzania; 3°51′40″S 32°40′15″E

Production
- Production: 189,000
- Financial year: 2009

History
- Opened: 2009

Owner
- Company: Acacia Mining
- Website: Company website
- Acquired: 2000

Buzwagi Gold Mine is an open pit gold mine in the Shinyanga Region of Tanzania, located 6 kilometres southeast from the town of Kahama. It is operated by Acacia Mining.

It is one of three gold mines Acacia Mining operates in Tanzania, the other two being Bulyanhulu and the North Mara Gold Mine. In the financial year 2014, the company produced a combined amount of 719,000 attributable ounces of gold.

== History ==
Gold mining in Tanzania in modern times dates back to the German colonial period, beginning with gold discoveries near Lake Victoria in 1894. The first gold mine in what was then Tanganyika, the Sekenke Mine, began operation in 1909, and gold mining in Tanzania experienced a boom between 1930 and World War II. By 1967, gold production in the country had dropped to insignificance but was revived in the mid-1970s, when the gold price rose once more. In the late 1990s, foreign mining companies started investing in the exploration and development of gold deposits in Tanzania, leading to the opening of a number of new mines.

Surface mineralisation at Buzwagi was originally discovered by artisinal miners, as is so frequently the case with gold deposits in Africa.

Sometime during the period 1992 and 1995, both Pangea Goldfields Inc. and Anglo American prospecting discovered their workings, in the case of Anglo American, by following up on soil samples collected on their behalf by De Beers who were prospecting the same region for diamonds. Also during that period, Pangea staked claims over the Buzwagi artisinal workings, after which Anglo American entered into a 70/30 Buzwagi joint venture with Pangea in 1995, and proceeded to drill the first boreholes into the deposit.

In 1999, by which time the gold resource at Buzwagi was approximately 1.75 million ounces of gold, Anglo American's 70% share of the project passed to AngloGold.

Barrick acquired Buzwagi, alongside Tulawaka, as part of its acquisition of Pangea Goldfields Inc. in 2000. The mine, the second largest mining operation and the largest single open pit mine in Tanzania, opened in 2009. The mine was construction for Buzwagi cost approximately $400 million, and employed more than 3,000 staff. It consists of an open pit mine, ore processing facilities, a waste rock storage facility, a tailings storage facility, as well as water management and other ancillary facilities. In 2009, Buzwagi employed close to 1,500 staff. It has, as of 2014, an expected mine life of 5 years remaining.

In 2010, 60 employees were suspended, after Barrick discovered widespread fuel theft by employees at the mine.
