= North Mara Gold Mine =

Gold mine in Tanzania

North Mara
- Location in Tanzania North Mara Gold Mine (Africa) North Mara Gold Mine (Earth)
- Location: Tarime, Mara, Tanzania; 01°28′S 034°31′E
- Opened: 2002
- Closed: 2024 (expected)
- Company: Acacia Mining plc
- Website: Acacia website
- Acquired: 2006

North Mara Gold Mine is a combined open pit and underground gold mine in the Tarime District of the Mara Region of Tanzania. It is one of three gold mines of Acacia Mining plc, a company listed on the London Stock Exchange, that operates in Tanzania, the other two being Bulyanhulu and the Buzwagi Gold Mine.

The mine has been controversial in the local community, with an attack on the mine in 2008. Though parts of the government and the operating company deny it, a 2016 study counted at least 20 local deaths and nearly 1000 cattle.

== History ==
Gold mining in Tanzania in modern times dates back to the German colonial period, beginning with gold discoveries near Lake Victoria in 1894. The first gold mine in what was then Tanganyika, the Sekenke Mine, began operation in 1909, and gold mining in Tanzania experienced a boom between 1930 and World War II. By 1967, gold production in the country had dropped to insignificance but was revived in the mid-1970s, when the gold price rose once more. In the late 1990s, foreign mining companies started investing in the exploration and development of gold deposits in Tanzania, leading to the opening of a number of new mines.

The North Mara mine, which opened in 2002, consists of one active open pit (Nyabirama) and one active underground mine (Gokona), a process plant, waste rock dumps, a tailings containment pond, and other associated facilities. As of 2014 there was an expected mine life of 9 years remaining.

The mine was owned by Afrika Mashariki Gold Mines, which became Placer Dome Tanzania, a subsidiary of Placer Dome. Barrick Gold took over Placer Dome in January 2006.

== 2008 attack ==
In 2008 a group of 200 people broke into the North Mara mine site and destroyed approximately US$15 million worth of Barrick property, including setting some of it on fire. The vandalism resulted in temporarily closing an open pit, and an increase in security on the property. Motivation for the attack on the property was not determined, the local police suggested they were attempting to get gold from the pit.

== Environment ==
In 2009 a Tanzanian Member of Parliament, Harrison Mwakyembe, demanded the Mara Gold Mine be closed, due to the deaths of eighteen villagers from Nyamongo which had been attributed to drinking water polluted by the mine. In February 2010 the National Assembly of Tanzania ordered the government to have a study completed to determine if the North Mara Gold Mine was polluting the Tigithe River (the drinking water supply for more than 250,000 people), thereby killing people and livestock, as had been reported. The government accepted the "principle" of doing the study, and stated that there had been minimal environmental monitoring done in the area because the National Environment Management Council is quite small, with only 20 environmental inspectors for the entire country.

In June 2010 the Tanzanian government declared the Tigithe River free of pollution, following changes made to Barrick's environmental program. The government stated the water is potable and suitable for human consumption. Barrick had replaced 40,000 square metres (430,000 sq ft) of liner within their effluent pond, which they claim was destroyed by vandalism.

A 2016 study concluded that the mine regularly and repeatedly violated human rights protections for the Right to a healthy environment in Tanzania.

== Killings at the mine ==
In 2011 and 2013 several villagers who entered the mine area looking for gold were killed by police officers assigned to support the mine's security guards. The court case brought against the mining company by Humans Rights Organizations on behalf of families was settled out of court in February 2015.
