= Bulyanhulu Gold Mine =

Gold mine in Tanzania

Bulyanhulu
- Location of Bulyanhulu Gold Mine.
- Location: Kahama, Shinyanga, Tanzania; 03°14′S 032°29′E
- Opened: 2001
- Closed: 2034 (expected)
- Company: Acacia Mining
- Website: ACA website
- Acquired: 1999

Bulyanhulu Gold Mine is an underground gold mine in the Shinyanga Region of Tanzania, located 55 kilometres south of Lake Victoria. It is one of three gold mines owned by Acacia Mining plc, formerly African Barrick Gold plc, a company owned by Barrick Gold, which is listed on the London Stock Exchange, and operates in Tanzania. Acacia also owns Buzwagi Gold Mine and the North Mara Gold Mine.

== History ==
Gold mining in Tanzania in modern times dates back to the German colonial period, beginning with gold discoveries near Lake Victoria in 1894. The first gold mine in what was then Tanganyika, the Sekenke Mine, began operation in 1909, and gold mining in Tanzania experienced a boom between 1930 and World War II. By 1967, gold production in the country had dropped to insignificance but was revived in the mid-1970s, when the gold price rose once more. In the late 1990s, foreign mining companies started investing in the exploration and development of gold deposits in Tanzania, leading to the opening of a number of new mines.

Barrick acquired the Bulyanhulu project in 1999 when it purchased Sutton Resources. The mine is located 150 kilometres (93 mi) southwest of the city of Mwanza, a regional center. Bulyanhulu opened in 2001, and was built for a capital cost of US$280 million. Following the opening of Bulyanhulu, Tanzania became the third largest producer of gold in Africa, behind South Africa and Mali.

Bulyanhulu consists of an underground mine, a process plant, waste rock dumps, tailing containment, water management ponds, and associated facilities. As of 2014 there was an expected mine life of over 25 years remaining. When it opened it was Tanzania's deepest mine.

=== Evictions ===
In the early 1990s Kahama Mining—a subsidiary of Sutton Resources, a mineral exploration company—acquired the rights to explore the area. Small-scale miners claimed title to the land. On 31 July 1996 evictions started, and on 4 August 1996 miners obtained an injunction from the High Court to stop the regional commissioner from clearing the area until the land rights issue had been ruled upon by the court. According to Amnesty International and the miners' union, police and Kahama employees ignored the injunction and continued evictions. In a press release the Inspector General of the Police claimed that around 200,000 people had been evicted. Canadian diplomatic officials estimated that between 10,000 and 20,000 miners had left.

The small-scale miners claim that the police used force to evict from the area, and that Kahama used graders to seal off mine shafts with sand, knowingly burying alive miners who were still working inside. The police and Barrick Gold, the current owner of the site, deny that killings took place. A 2002 report by the Compliance Advisor/Ombudsman (CAO) of the International Finance Corporation (IFC), based on a 2001 visit to the site, concluded that there was not evidence of murder. Amnesty International has been denied access to the site by Tanzanian authorities, as was a team of international observers in 2001, the latter allegedly because they had entered the country with tourist visas.

== Safety ==
In 2006 a miner was killed by a falling rock, and in March 2010 a fall of ground was responsible for the death of three miners and the destruction of the drill jumbo they were operating. In 2009 Bulyanhulu was awarded a National Award by Tanzania Occupational Safety and Health Authority for their health and safety program.

The Bulyanhulu mine has an experienced Emergency Response Team, which is often sent off site to other locations to assist in rescue operations at both operating and closed mines.
