= Sekenke Gold Mine =

Former gold mine in Tanzania

- Location of Sekenke Gold Mine. Sekenke Gold Mine (Africa) Sekenke Gold Mine (Earth)
- Location: Singida, Tanzania; 03°57′S 34°15′E
- Production: inactive
- Financial year: 2009
- Opened: 1909
- Closed: 1959
- Company: Barrick Gold

The Sekenke Gold Mine (German: Sachsenwald, "Saxon Forest") was an underground gold mine in the Singida Region of Tanzania.

In the era before the Second World War, Sekenke was the largest single producer of gold in which is now the present-day Tanzania, which was the then colony of Tanganyika. The mine closed in 1959 and exploration rights in the area of the old mine now lay with Barrick Gold, through its subsidiary, Sekenke Exploration Limited, while the wider area around the mine is under exploration by Currie Rose Resources Inc.

== History ==
In 1916, German East Africa used gold from the Sekenke Gold Mine to mint 15-rupie coins amid the wartime coin shortage.

Gold mining in Tanzania in modern times dates back to the German colonial period, beginning with gold discoveries near Lake Victoria in 1894.

Sekenke became the first gold mine in Tanganyika, when it began operation in 1909, after gold having been discovered there in 1907. It was one of two mines to open in the region, the other being the Kirondatal Gold Mine. Sekenke became the largest single producer of gold in the pre-war period of the late 1930s in Tanzania, when gold mining in the country experienced a boom between 1930 and the Second World War.

During the First World War, gold from Sekenke was used to mint coins to pay German troops fighting against the allied forces in the Belgian Congo.

Sekenke was developed as an underground mine, reaching up to 200 m below surface. The mine produced 140,000 ounces of gold at the time while the nearby Kirondatal mine, active from 1934 to 1950, produced just over 7,000 ounces. The Sekenke mine closed in 1959, having produced an average grade of 15.4 g/t of gold and 2.5 g/t of silver in its 50 years of operation.

By 1967, gold production in Tanzania had dropped to insignificance but was revived in the mid-1970s, when the gold price rose once more. In the late 1990s, foreign mining companies started investing in the exploration and development of gold deposits in Tanzania, leading to the opening of a number of new mines. Sekenke however was not reopened.
