= Carosue Dam Gold Mine =

Gold mine in Western Australia

Carosue Dam
- Location in Western Australia
- Interactive map of Carosue Dam
- Location: Laverton, Western Australia, Australia; 30°09′11″S 122°21′08″E
- Products: Gold
- Production: 243,246 ounces
- Financial year: 2022–23
- Opened: 2000
- Active: 2000–2005 2010–present
- Company: Northern Star Resources
- Website: www.nsrltd.com
- Acquired: February 2006

The Carosue Dam Gold Mine is a gold mine located south of Laverton, Western Australia.

Carosue Dam was previously owned by the now defunct mining company Sons of Gwalia Limited. Purchased in 2005, the mine was placed into care and maintenance by new owners St Barbara in June 2005 and sold to Saracen Mineral Holdings in February 2006. Saracen reopened the mine in early 2010. It is now owned and operated by Northern Star Resources after a merger with Saracen in 2021.

== History ==
Gold mines in the Kalgoorlie - Leonora region

Located within the South Laverton gold field, situated 120 km north east of Kalgoorlie, the processing plant at Carosue Dam was constructed and commissioned in 2000, then owned by Pacmin Mining. In October 2001, it was acquired by Sons of Gwalia. During its five-year operation until June 2005, the mine produced over 700,000 ounces of gold.

Sons of Gwalia went into administration on 30 August 2004 and the company's gold mining operations were sold to St Barbara Limited in March 2005 for A$38 million, having been valued by the Sons of Gwalia directors at A$120 million. It was one of four gold mines sold to St Barbara in this deal, the other three being the Marvel Loch Gold Mine, the Tarmoola Gold Mine and the Gwalia Gold Mine.

After the collapse of Sons of Gwalia in 2004, the mine continued producing but was placed in care and maintenance by St Barbara three months after its purchase.

In October 2005, St Barbara announced the sale of Carosue Dam to Saracen for A$19.4 million in cash and shares. St Barbara acquired a 20% interest in Saracens through this transaction.

With the purchase of the mine by Saracen, the new owners developed a two-staged plan to reopen the mine in 2010. After a period of open pit mining, lasting for three to five years, the second stage will also include an underground operation.

On 15 June 2009 Saracen announced that the mine would be connected to the Western Power grid through a 90 km power line rather than being supplied by diesel generators on site. This line, scheduled to be completed in late 2010, is estimated to cost between $10 and 15 million but should provide the company with savings in the range of $50 to 100 per ounce of gold produced.

In November 2009, Saracen announced that the $7 million construction project at the mine had been finished and plant commissioning had started. Gold production was scheduled to begin in February 2010, with the first gold pour announced on 29 January 2010.

In October 2020, a merger between Northern Star Resources and Saracen Metal Holdings was proposed and completed in February 2021 when Saracen was de-listed from the Australian Securities Exchange.

As of 2022, the mine operated by Northern Star Resources as an underground and surface operation.

A 5MW solar power station was commissioned in June 2022 to reduce the mine's emissions by over 5600 tonnes per year.

== Production ==
Production of the mine:

Year	Production	Grade	Cost per ounce
2001	121, 161 ounces	1.76 g/t	A$345
2002	95,144 ounces^{[1]}	1.8 g/t	A$388
2002–03	139,894 ounces		A$426
2003–04	172,388 ounces		A$387
2005	29,528 ounces^{[2]}	3.28 g/t	A$349
2005–09	inactive		
2009–10	25,036 ounces		A$654
2010–11	111,163 ounces		A$738
2011–12			
2012–13			
2013–14			
2014–15			
2015–16	157,191 ounces	2.3 g/t	A$1,067
2016–17	155,970 ounces	2.14 g/t	A$1,413
2017–18	171,301 ounces	2.3 g/t	A$1,199
2018–19			
2019–20	203,280 ounces	3.2 g/t	A$1,263
2020–21	232,276 ounces	3.1 g/t	A$1,311
2021–22	237,625 ounces	2.1 g/t	A$1,785
2022–23	243,246 ounces	2.2 g/t	A$1,885

== Notes ==
- ^[1]2002 results for January to September only.
- ^[1]28 March to 30 June period only.
