= Marvel Loch Gold Mine =

Gold mine in Western Australia

Marvel Loch
- Location in Western Australia
- Interactive map of Marvel Loch
- Location: Marvel Loch, Western Australia, Australia; 31°28′10″S 119°29′49″E
- Production: undisclosed
- Financial year: 2022
- Active: –2012 2014–present
- Company: Barto Gold Mining (owner) Minjar Gold (operator)
- Website: www.minjargold.com.au
- Acquired: 2013

The Marvel Loch Gold Mine is a gold mine located at Marvel Loch, 30 km (19 mi) south of Southern Cross, Western Australia.

It is operated by St Barbara Limited. Apart from Marvel Loch, St Barbara also operated the Gwalia Gold Mine at Leonora and owned the Tarmoola Gold Mine, which was placed in care and maintenance.

All three mines were previously owned by the now defunct mining company Sons of Gwalia Limited. Sons of Gwalia went into administration on 30 August 2004 and the company's gold mining operations were sold to St Barbara in March 2005 for A$38 million, having been valued by the Sons of Gwalia directors at A$120 million. While Marvel Loch was operational before and after the sale, the Gwalia mine was already placed in care and maintenance at the time of the transaction. A fourth mine, the Carosue Dam Gold Mine, ceased operation in June 2005 and was sold by St Barbara.

The mine is owned by Barto Gold Mining but operated by Minjar Gold.

== History ==
Sons of Gwalia logo

Mining in the area around Marvel Loch dates back to the early 1900s and between 1905 and 1986, 3,860 kilograms (136,300 oz) of gold were recorded as having been mined.

From 1979 to 1987, the mine was operated as a joint venture between Kia Ora Gold Corporation NL and Western United Limited, after which it was sold to Mawson Pacific Limited. Mawson Pacific subsequently sold the mine to Reynolds Australia Gold Operations Ltd, a wholly owned subsidiary of Reynolds US Metals. During its period of ownership Reynolds acquired the Southern Cross Mill and adjacent tenements including the Transvaal Underground Mine and the Cornishman Open Pit (a 50/50 joint venture with Troy Resources NL) located approximately 25 km (16 mi) north of Marvel Loch. On 1 April 2005 the Marvel Loch Mine together with the Southern Cross Mill and adjacent mines was sold to Sons of Gwalia for $23m. During 1995 and 1996 Sons of Gwalia acquired Orion Gold NL and Gasgoyne Gold Mines NL whom together owned the Yilgarn Star Joint Venture approximately 16 km (9.9 mi) south of Marvel Loch. The Yilgarn Star Joint Venture operated the Yilgarn Star Open Pit and Underground mine and mill as well as the Nevoria Gold Mine.

Sons of Gwalia mined the Marvel Loch deposit as a surface mine for the most part of the mine's history since reopening in the 1990s, upgrading its production facility in 2001. In February 2001, the company announced it consolidated its Southern Cross operations, acquiring the remaining 30% of the Yilgarn Star Gold Mine it didn't own and merging the operation with Marvel Loch, closing the Yilgarn Star mill. It also acquired other interests in the region in this transaction. Since then, production from Yilgarn has been listed under Marvel Loch.

After a rapid rise of the company, unauthorised gold and foreign exchange trading activities by chief financial officer Eardley Ross-Adjie in the year to June 2000, ended up costing Sons of Gwalia more than A$190 million. Sons of Gwalia went into administration on 30 August 2004, following a financial collapse, with debts exceeding $800 million after suffering from falling gold reserves and hedging losses. Sons of Gwalia was Australia's third-largest gold producer and also controlled more than half the world's production of tantalum.

St Barbara purchased the mine from insolvent Sons of Gwalia in March 2005.

Since the purchase of the Mine by St Barbara, mining has been carried out both in surface and underground operations. In July 2009, St Barbara suspended open pit mining at Marvel Loch and decided that the treatment plant would be operated on a week-on, week-off basis.

After placing the mine in care and maintenance in late 2012, St Barbara sold the mine for A$22.5 million in cash to Chinese company Hanking Gold Mining in January 2013. Hanking Gold eventually reopened the mine, commencing mining in August 2014 and pouring first gold in early 2015.

Barto Gold Mining and the mine are owned by Shandong Tianye Group Bid Co Pty Ltd, which purchased Hanking Gold Mining for A$330 million in early 2017. The mine is operated by Minjar Gold.

== Production ==
Production of the mine (including Yilgarn Star since June 2001):

=== Yilgarn Star ===
Quarter	Production	Grade	Cost per ounce
1997-98	88,417 ounces		
2000	103,122 ounces	4.43 g/t	A$384
2001 ^{1} .	23,511 ounces	3.76 g/t	A$491

- ^{2} January to June 2002 only.

=== Marvel Loch ===
Quarter	Production	Grade	Cost per ounce
1997-98	90,008 ounces		
2000	138,491 ounces	2.48 g/t	A$416
2001	176,026 ounces	2.89 g/t	A$419
2002	176,756 ounces	2.49 g/t	A$480
2002-03	217,019 ounces		A$454
2003-04	182,891 ounces		A$452
2005 ^{1}	53,719 ounces	2.94 g/t	A$336
2005–06	166,000 ounces	2.4 g/t	A$443
2006–07	171,182 ounces	2,6 g/t	A$508
2007–08	157,477 ounces	2.5 g/t	A$550
2008–09	156,105 ounces	2.5 g/t	A$888
2009–10			
2010–11			
2011–12			
2012–13			
2012–2014	in care and maintenance		
2015	58,887 ounces		
2016	121,456 ounces		
January–March 2017	26,917 ounces		
March–December 2017			
2018			
2019			
2020			
2021			
2022			

- ^{1} 2005 results for 28 March to 30 June only.
