= Gwalia Gold Mine =

Mine in Western Australia

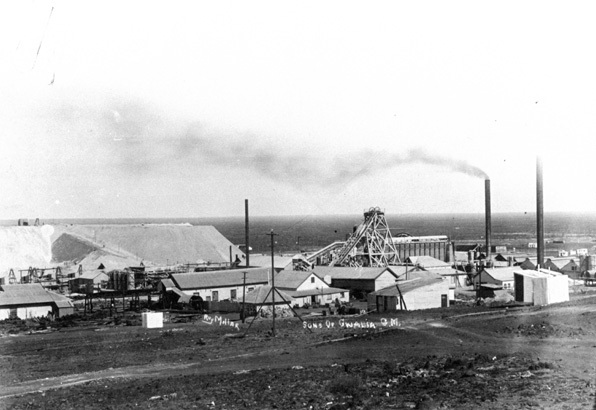
- Gwalia Gold Mine c. 1921

- Location in Western Australia
- Interactive map of Gwalia Gold Mine
- Location: Gwalia, Western Australia, Australia; 28°55′07″S 121°20′00″E
- Products: Gold
- Production: 138,050 troy ounces (4,294 kg)
- Financial year: 2022–23
- Opened: 1896
- Company: Genesis Minerals Limited
- Website: genesisminerals.com.au/leonora-gold-project
- Acquired: July 2023

The Gwalia Gold Mine is located at Gwalia, a few kilometres south of Leonora, Western Australia. It was originally established by Welsh miners in the late 19th century and Herbert Hoover, the later President of the United States, served as the mine manager in its early days from May to November 1898.

It is operated by Genesis Minerals Limited. The mine, with a depth of 1,600 metres (5,200 ft) in 2019, is Australia's deepest underground gold mine and the deepest trucking mine in the world, with a proposed depth of 2,300 metres (7,500 ft) by 2031. From its discovery to 2019, the mine produced 5.5 million troy ounces (170 t) of gold, at a 2019 equivalent value of A$10 billion.

== History ==
Sons of Gwalia logo

It was established in 1896 as the Sons of Gwalia mine. It was referred to in the Welsh-language press as Aur-gloddfa Meibion Gwalia, meaning "[the] goldmine [of the] sons [of] Gwalia". Gwalia is a medieval Latin name for Wales which became popular in Welsh-language poetry in the nineteenth century.

The Sons of Gwalia reef was discovered by three prospectors who worked it for a brief time. After selling out to George Hall for £5,000 the latter recouped his investment after only one month. In search for additional capital, Hall began negotiations with a London firm, Bewick Moreing, who sent Herbert Hoover, a 23-year-old mining engineer, to the site. Hoover recommended Bewick Moreing purchase the mine, which they did with a cash commitment of £100,000 on 17 November 1897. He suggested himself as manager of the project and successfully reduced costs at the mine by hiring Italian labour.

A fierce rivalry between Gwalia and neighbouring Leonora developed and a tram service was established between the two towns in 1903. From the 1920s, the town started to decline when external factors like the falling gold price started to affect the mine. On 21 December 1963, the gold mine at Gwalia closed and the town was reduced in population from 1,500 to 40. The Sons of Gwalia mining company was delisted for the first time on 4 February 1964. In 65 years of operation, the mine had produced 2.5 million troy ounces (78 tonnes) of gold.

Gold mines in the Kalgoorlie - Leonora region

In the 1980s, a new Sons of Gwalia company, formed by the brothers Peter and Chris Lalor, descendants of Peter Lalor, started retreating old tailings before mining the old workings. In 1999, having concluded mining the Gwalia open pit, it started to develop an underground operation, passing through old workings by 2001.

On 4 September 2000, a flight to the Gwalia mine with seven Sons of Gwalia employees failed to land, instead continuing on to Burketown, where it eventually crashed, having run out of fuel. The pilot and the plane's seven passengers were killed.

From 2001 onwards, the mine was part of the company's Leonora operations, after it acquired the Tarmoola Gold Mine through a merger with Pacmin Mining. Tarmoola is located 40 km (25 mi) north of the Gwalia mine.

In December 2003, the mine was placed in care and maintenance after known gold resources were exhausted.

After a rapid rise of the company, unauthorised gold and foreign exchange trading activities by chief financial officer Eardley Ross-Adjie in the year to June 2000, ended up costing Sons of Gwalia more than A$190 million. Sons of Gwalia went into administration on 30 August 2004, following a financial collapse, with debts exceeding $800 million after suffering from falling gold reserves and hedging losses. Sons of Gwalia was Australia's third-largest gold producer and also controlled more than half the world's production of tantalum.

Apart from Gwalia, St Barbara also formerly operated the Marvel Loch Gold Mine at Marvel Loch and Tarmoola Gold Mine. All three mines were previously owned by the now defunct mining company Sons of Gwalia Limited. Sons of Gwalia went into administration on 30 August 2004 and the company's gold mining operations were sold to St Barbara in March 2005 for A$38 million, having been valued by the Sons of Gwalia directors at A$120 million. While Marvel Loch was operational before and after the sale, the Gwalia mine was already placed in care and maintenance at the time of the transaction. A fourth mine, the Carosue Dam Gold Mine, ceased operation in June 2005. All three have since been sold by St Barbara.

St Barbara purchased the mine from insolvent Sons of Gwalia in March 2005 with a three-year plan to reopen it.

After a three-year redevelopment, production resumed at the mine in September 2008, with the first gold pour being carried out in October 2008. The Hoover decline, named after the late President, was at 1,191 metres (3,907 ft) below surface as of 30 June 2009, with the plant operating on a campaign basis, one week on, one week off.

The Gwalia Gold Mine has continued underground production since reopening in 2008. By 2019, with a depth of 1,600 metres (5,200 ft), it became Australia's deepest underground gold mine and the deepest trucking mine in the world with all deeper gold mines operating with shafts rather than declines. Scheduled at the time to close by 2024, the mine's life was extended to 2031, with a proposed depth of 2,300 metres (7,500 ft).

In 2023, St Barbara sold the mine to Genesis Minerals.

== Production ==
Production of the mine:

Year	Production	Grade	Cost per ounce
1997-98	113,767 ounces		
2000	169,025 ounces	3.28 g/t	A$301
2001	164,895 ounces	3.13 g/t	A$324
2002 ^{[1]}	79,353 ounces	1.99 g/t	A$457
2002–03 ^{[2]}	237,036 ounces		A$470
2003–04 ^{[2]}	165,802 ounces		A$476
2004–05			
2005–2008	inactive		
2008–09	82,795 ounces	3.3 g/t	A$719
2010–11 ^{[3]}	131,133 ounces		A$765
2011–12 ^{[3]}	184,534 ounces		A$646
2012–13			
2013–14			
2014–15			
2015–16			
2016–17	265,000 ounces		
2017–18	268,000 ounces		
2018–19	220,000 ounces		
2019–20	171,156 ounces	7.1 g/t	A$1,485
2020–21	152,696 ounces	6.6 g/t	A$1,744
2021–22	191,459 ounces	6.0 g/t	A$1,717
2022–23	138,050 ounces	5.19 g/t	A$2,521

== Notes ==
- ^[1]2002 results for January to September only. Additionally to this, the Kundana and East Kundana underground operations were added to the Mungari Operation in 2021.
- ^[2]Combined result for the Leonora operations, consisting of Gwalia and Tarmoola. The Gwalia mine however closed in December 2003.
- ^[3]Only the Gwalia mine, excludes King of the Hills extension.
