= Lingbao =

Lingbao may refer to:

- Lingbao School (灵宝派), branch of Taoism
- Lingbao City (灵宝市), county-level city of Sanmenxia, Henan, China
- Lingbao Gold (灵宝黄金), gold mining company headquartered in Lingbao City
