= Sons of Gwalia =

Former gold mining company of Western Australia

Sons of Gwalia Limited
- Type: Public
- Industry: Mining
- Founded: 28 August 1981
- Founder: Peter & Chris Lalor
- Defunct: 2006
- Fate: Administration
- Headquarters: West Perth, Australia
- Key people: John Leevers – MD/CEO; Peter Lalor – Chairman; Chris Lalor – Executive director
- Products: Gold, tantalum
- Production output: Tantalum: 2.29 million lb (1.04 million kg); Gold: 521,081 ozt (16,207.4 kg)

Sons of Gwalia was a Western Australian mining company that mined gold, tantalum, spodumene, lithium and tin. It was Australia's third-largest gold producer and controlled more than half of the world's production of tantalum, before entering administration in August 2004 following a financial collapse.

== History ==
=== First and second incarnations ===
The original, Sons of Gwalia G. M. Co. was formed in 1897 by George William Hall, major investor William Pritchard Morgan and others to own and operate the Sons of Gwalia mine, which had been discovered in March 1896 by prospectors A. Glendinning, Jack Carlson and Frank White, who had named it after the Welsh homeland of the syndicate funder, Coolgardie storekeeper Thomas Tobias. The mine gave its name to the adjacent town of Gwalia.

In May 1897, Herbert Hoover, manager and inspecting engineer of the London and Western Australian Exploration Company, an associate of the British management firm Bewick, Moreing & Co., inspected the Sons of Gwalia operation and recommended the acquisition of the mine.

The London and West Australian Exploration Company acquired the Sons of Gwalia property on 17 November 1897, and Bewick Moreing & Co launched Sons of Gwalia, Limited on the London Stock Exchange in January 1898. Hoover was appointed superintendent of the Sons of Gwalia Mine and managed it from May to November 1898 before moving on to China. He was later to become 31st president of the United States (1929–1933).

The mine operated continuously until 1963, when it closed and Sons of Gwalia, Limited was liquidated.

==== Geology ====
Gold mineralization occurred in the mine schist, which was up to 150 metres thick. Lenticular ore bodies occurred in this schist, with the eastern limb called the Main Lode dipping 45 degrees to the east, and the western limb called the West Lode dipping 38 degrees to the east, since the surface expression was horseshoe shaped plunging to the south at a 70-degree angle. The Mine schist is bracketed by a hanging wall of basalt and a foot wall of ultramafic rock. Pyrite was the most common of the sulfide minerals in the ore body. The Gwalia lode system was developed down to 1750 m.

=== Third incarnation ===
Sons of Gwalia NL was incorporated in August 1981. It issued its initial public prospectus in 1983 to raise $2.5 million on the Perth Stock Exchange (later the Australian Securities Exchange).

In 1998, the company closed its Laverton Gold Mine, which it sold to Focus Technologies Limited (later Focus Minerals Limited) for A$2.68 million in July 2002.

The company appointed Mark Cutifani, well regarded in the mining industry, as managing director on 13 March 2000.

On 4 September 2000, a flight to the Gwalia mine with seven SGW employees failed to land, instead continuing on to Burketown, where it eventually crashed, having run out of fuel. The pilot and the plane's seven passengers were killed.

In February 2001, the company announced it had consolidated its Southern Cross operations, acquiring the remaining 30% of the Yilgarn Star Gold Mine it didn't own and merging the operation with Marvel Loch, closing the Yilgarn Star mill. It also acquired other interests in the region in this transaction.

On 23 August 2001, SGW made a takeover offer for Pacmin Mining, owner of the Carosue Dam Gold Mine and the Tarmoola Gold Mine, valued at A$159 million. At the close of offer on 16 October 2001, SGW held 98.9% of all Pacmin shares and proceeded to compulsory acquisition. In retrospect, the purchase of Pacmin and Tarmoola was seen as very expensive, especially in the light of gold reserve writedowns and operational difficulties at the Tarmoola mine.

In early 2003, the company started to show signs of being troubled. It had to deny reports by UBS Warburg on 13 February 2003, that one of its investment bankers had withdrawn support. The following day, managing director Mark Cutifani, in a surprise move, resigned from his position. In July 2003, the company announced the results of a restructuring, aimed at improving the performance of SGW. In October that year, the company successfully raised A$63 million by issuing new shares.

Almost a year after the resignation of Mark Cutifani, John Leevers was appointed managing director of the company from 27 January 2004. In April 2004, the company's chairman Peter Lalor and his brother Chris, an executive director, having founded the company 22 years earlier, resigned from their positions on the board. John Leevers was appointed managing director and CEO.

=== Administration ===
The company entered administration in August 2004 following a financial collapse, with debts exceeding $800 million after suffering from falling gold reserves and hedging losses. Sons of Gwalia was Australia's third-largest gold producer and also controlled more than half the world's production of tantalum.

In March 2005, the company sold its gold mining operations, consisting of the Marvel Loch Gold Mine, the Gwalia Gold Mine, the Carosue Dam Gold Mine and the Tarmoola Gold Mine, to St Barbara Mining Limited for A$38 million. Talison Minerals paid $205 million to buy the Wodgina and Greenbushes tantalum business of Sons of Gwalia but temporarily closed Wodgina because of falling tantalum prices. The mine re-opened, but closed again after less than a year.

In a landmark decision, the shareholders of Sons of Gwalia were awarded the same status as non-shareholding creditors on 27 February 2006 because the company breached continuous disclosure obligations or misled them about its financial status. On 29 August 2006, Sons of Gwalia (SGW) was de-listed from the Australian Securities Exchange.

On 4 September 2009, the former auditors of Sons of Gwalia, Ernst & Young, agreed to a $125 million settlement over their role in the gold miner's collapse. Ferrier Hodgson, the company's administrator, had claimed Ernst & Young was negligent over the accounting of gold and dollar hedging contracts. It is hoped the $178 million of assets will assist in bringing the long-running administration to a close in December 2009.

In addition to the $125 million from E & Y, SoG's former directors the Lalor brothers, agreed to a $53 million settlement over their role in the company's collapse.

== Production ==
Annual production figures of the company:

=== Gold ===
Year	Production	Grade	Cost
1997–98	517,978 ozt (16,110.9 kg)		
1998–99			
1999–2000	413,184 ozt (12,851.5 kg)		A$337/ozt (A$10.8/g)
2000–01	438,166 ozt (13,628.5 kg)		
2001–02	541,224 ozt (16,833.9 kg)		
2002–03	577,702 ozt (17,968.5 kg)		A$454/ozt (A$14.6/g)
2003–04	521,081 ozt (16,207.4 kg)		A$438/ozt (A$14.1/g)
2004–05			

=== Tantalum ===
Year	Production
1997–98	877,281 lb (397,928 kg)
1998–99	
1999–2000	1,111,967 lb (504,380 kg)
2000–01	1,625,364 lb (737,253 kg)
2001–02	2,138,841 lb (970,162 kg)
2002–03	2,193,792 lb (995,087 kg)
2003–04	2.29 million lb (1.04 million kg)
2004–05	

== Timeline ==
- 5 May 1983: Listed on the Perth Stock Exchange.
- 30 July 1992: Changed name from Sons of Gwalia NL to Sons of Gwalia Limited.
- 13 March 2000: Mark Cutifani appointed as managing director.
- 4 September 2000: A flight from Perth to the Gwalia mine fails to land and continues on to North Queensland, where it crashes without survivors.
- 23 August 2001: SGW makes takeover offer for Pacmin Mining, valued at A$159 million.
- 16 October 2001: Compulsory acquisition of Pacmin announced, at a cost of A$210 million.
- 14 February 2003: Managing director Mark Cutifani resigned from his position.
- 15 October 2003: The company successfully raised A$63 million by issuing new shares.
- December 2003: Gwalia Gold Mine closed and placed in care and maintenance.
- 19 January 2004: John Leevers appointed as managing director. Peter and Chris Lalor to retire from company.
- 30 August 2004: Administrators appointed for the company.
- 17 September 2004: Class action filed against company as well as directors, auditors and officers of company by shareholders.
- 28 January 2005: Five directors, including the chairman, and the company secretary resign.
- 15 March 2005: Managing director John Leevers resigns.
- 21 March 2005: Gold operations sold to St Barbara for A$38 million.
- 15 September 2005: Shareholders awarded equal status to creditors in court.
- 29 August 2006: Company delisted from the ASX after failing to pay its annual listing fee.
