= Simberi mine =

Gold mine in New Ireland, Papua New Guinea

- Location: New Ireland Province, Papua New Guinea
- Products: Gold
- Opened: 2008
- Company: St Barbara Limited
- Website: Our Simberi Operations

The Simberi mine is one of the largest gold mines in Papua New Guinea. The mine is located in the north of the country on Simberi Island, New Ireland Province. The mine, owned by St Barbara Limited, has estimated reserves of 3.3 million oz of gold.

In December 2025, it was announced that China’s Lingbao Gold Group had agreed to acquire a 50% interest in St Barbara Limited's wholly owned subsidiary, St Barbara Mining Limited (SBML), for A$370 million (US$245.57 million) in cash. Upon completion, SBML will continue to hold an 80% interest in the Simberi gold project, with Lingbao and St Barbara each holding equal ownership of SBML. The transaction forms part of a broader restructuring that includes a proposed 20% sale of the Simberi project to Papua New Guinea's state-owned Kumul Mineral Holdings for A$100 million. The agreements remain subject to regulatory approvals in China and Papua New Guinea, as well as the extension of the Simberi mining lease and a final investment decision on the Simberi expansion project.
