= St Barbara (company) =

Gold mining company in Australia

St Barbara Limited
- Traded as: ASX: SBM
- Industry: Gold mines
- Founded: 1969
- Headquarters: Australia
- Website: stbarbara.com.au

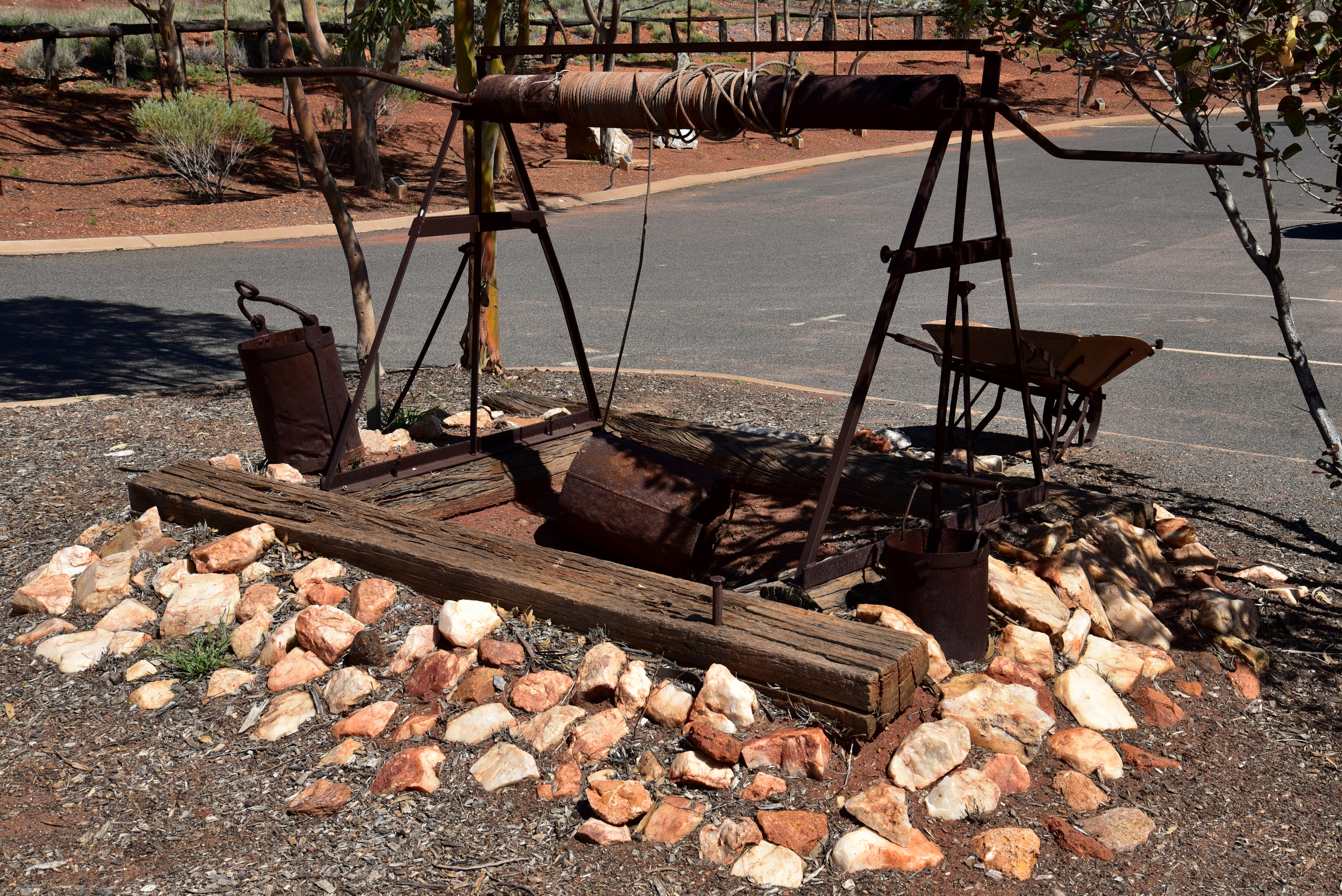
View of (probably a replica) small headframe adjacent to the St Barbara Leonora Operations office building

St Barbara Limited is an Australian-based, Australian Securities Exchange-listed (ASX) gold producer and explorer.

== History ==
The company was incorporated and listed in 1969 as Endeavour Oil and initially focused on mineral exploration and production from assets located in Western Australia. In 2005, the company acquired the Southern Cross, Leonora and South Laverton gold assets from Sons of Gwalia Limited. St Barbara's high-grade Gwalia Gold Mine at Leonora was commissioned in October 2008.

In 2012, St Barbara acquired Allied Gold Mining Plc and its gold operations at Simberi in Papua New Guinea and Gold Ridge in the Solomon Islands. Operations at Gold Ridge in the Solomon Islands were suspended in April 2014 due to torrential rainfall and ensuing flooding. The Gold Ridge Project was sold to a Solomon Islands company associated with local landowners in May 2015.

In May 2019, St Barbara bought Canadian Atlantic Gold Corp for Can$722 million ($536 million), adding a mine in Canada.

== Operations ==
St Barbara's mines include the Simberi open-pit gold mine in Papua New Guinea. In December 2025, it was announced that St Barbara Limited had agreed to sell a 50% stake in its wholly owned subsidiary, St Barbara Mining Limited (SBML), to China’s Lingbao Gold Group for A$370 million (US$245.57 million) in cash. Following completion, St Barbara and Lingbao will each hold a 50% interest in SBML, which owns an 80% stake in the Simberi gold project in Papua New Guinea. The agreements are subject to regulatory approvals and a final investment decision on the Simberi expansion project, with completion expected in 2026.

In May 2025, it was announced St Barbara's were developing their portfolio of assets in Nova Scotia, Canada.

== See also ==
- Gold mining in Western Australia
- Open-pit mining
- Underground mining
