= Lingbao Gold =

Chinese gold mining company

Lingbao Gold Group Company Ltd. 靈寶黃金集團股份有限公司
- Type: State-owned enterprise
- Industry: Gold mining
- Founded: 2002
- Headquarters: Lingbao, Henan, People's Republic of China
- Area served: People's Republic of China, Kyrgyzstan
- Key people: Chairman: Mr. Chen Jianzheng
- Operating income: RMB 581.65 million (2023)
- Net income: RMB 294.03 million (2023)
- Number of employees: 3,915 (2023)
- Website: Lingbao Gold Group Company Ltd.

Lingbao Gold Group Company Ltd. (SEHK: 3330) is a state-owned gold mining enterprise headquartered in Lingbao, Henan Province, China.

== Corporate Affairs ==
Lingbao Gold is a state-owned enterprise, with the majority stake held by the Lingbao Municipal Government. The company's corporate governance structure includes a Board of Directors led by Chairman Mr. Chen Jianzheng.

The company was listed on the Hong Kong Stock Exchange on January 12, 2006, with an initial public offering price of HK$3.33 per share.

In February 2024, the company completed a placement of new H shares, raising approximately HK$86 million. The placement involved the issuance of 20 million H shares at a price of HK$4.30 per share, aimed at strengthening the company's capital base and supporting future development projects.

== Mines ==
At the end of 2023, the company held 35 mining and exploration rights across Henan, Xinjiang, Inner Mongolia, Jiangxi, Gansu, and the Kyrgyz Republic and produced approximately 22.57 tonnes (725,476 ounces) of gold. The Group's total gold reserves and resources amounted to approximately 137.40 tonnes (4.42 million ounces).

Domestically, the Group's largest operation is the Henan Lingjin Mining Complex, which includes multiple underground vein-type deposits known for their relatively high average grades. Most of the Group's mines are underground operations, characterised by narrow, high-grade gold-bearing structures.

In Kyrgyzstan, Lingbao Gold also holds a stake in Full Gold Mining, the operator of the Ishtamberdy mine. The Ishtamberdy mine has estimated gold resources of around 140 metric tons, placing it among the larger deposits in the Jalal-Abad region. Full Gold Mining acquired development rights in exchange for investing in local infrastructure, including a US$38.57 million China Development Bank-financed road project.

In December 2025, it was announced Lingbao had entered into agreements to acquire a 50% stake in Australia-based St Barbara's wholly owned subsidiary, St Barbara Mining Limited (SBML), for A$370 million (US$245.57 million) in cash. Upon completion, SBML will hold an 80% interest in the Simberi gold project in Papua New Guinea, and a joint venture, known as the Simberi JV, will be established between Lingbao and St Barbara, each holding an equal interest in SBML. The transaction remains subject to regulatory approvals in China and Papua New Guinea, as well as an extension of the Simberi mining lease and a final investment decision on the project.
