= Marvel Loch, Western Australia =

Coordinates: 31°28′05″S 119°29′20″E

Marvel Loch
- Town
- Coordinates
- Country: Australia
- State: Western Australia
- LGA: Shire of Yilgarn
- Location: 401 km (249 mi) east of Perth; 31 km (19 mi) south east of Southern Cross; 115 km (71 mi) east of Merredin
- Established: 1901

Government
  - State electorate: Central Wheatbelt
  - Federal division: O'Connor

Area
  - Total: 845.5 km^{2} (326.4 sq mi)
- Elevation: 437 m (1,434 ft)

Population
  - Total: 120 (SAL 2021)
- Postcode: 6426

Marvel Loch is a small townsite of fewer than 100 people, 401 kilometres (249 mi) east of Perth, Western Australia. It is located 32 kilometres (20 mi) south west of Southern Cross, along the Perth to Kalgoorlie Great Eastern Highway. The town is located in the Shire of Yilgarn.

Gold was discovered in the area in the early 1890s. In 1906, following gold mining leases being issued to Markham, Doolette, Leneberg and Le Breton, who named their lease Marvel Loch. The town is named after the horse that won the Caulfield Cup in 1905. The town lies between the mine and another minesite, and the current location was surveyed in 1909 and the town was gazetted in 1911. The Marvel Loch Progress Association was formed in 1909, to help get a school established in the area, which was built by the Association in around 1910 out of lime wash hessian walls with bush poles and an iron roof. Growing attendance resulted in a bigger building being built in 1911.

Tianye SXO Gold Mining currently operate the Marvel Loch Gold Mine in Marvel Loch, and have a gold processing plant located near the town to process ore from their surrounding mines, Nevoria and Aquarius. The plant is projected to produce 200,000 ounces (5.7 tonnes) of gold in 2015.

The surrounding areas produce some wheat and other cereal crops. The town is a receival site for Cooperative Bulk Handling.

== Notable people ==
- John Panizza, federal senator
