= King of the Hills Gold Mine =

Gold mine in Western Australia

- Location in Western Australia
- Interactive map of King of the Hills Gold Mine
- Location: Leonora, Western Australia, Australia; 28°39′58″S 121°10′01″E
- Products: Gold
- Production: 102,574 ounces^{[4]}
- Financial year: 2022–23
- Opened: 1990
- Active: 1990–2005 2011–2016 2018–2021 2022–present
- Company: Red 5 Limited
- Website: www.red5limited.com
- Acquired: 2017

The King of the Hills Gold Mine, formerly the Tarmoola Gold Mine, is located 29 km north-west of Leonora, Western Australia. The mine was placed in care and maintenance from September 2004, when a pit wall failure forced its closure. It is owned by Saracen Mineral Holdings Limited.

The Tarmoola mine was originally developed and opened in May 1990 by Mt Edon Gold Mines Australia NL. It is now known as King of the Hills, the original name for the area from its discovery in 1897, and is owned and operated by Saracen Mineral Holdings Limited. Saracen commenced underground mining operations at King of the Hills in July 2016, but sold the mine to Red 5 Limited. Red 5 constructed a new processing plant at the mine and re-commenced underground mining in late March 2022.

== History ==
Gold mines in the Kalgoorlie - Leonora region

The mine, opened in May 1990, was discovered and developed by Mount Edon Mines until April 1997, when it was taken over by jointly by Camelot Resources and Teck Corporation through Reachwest Pty Ltd for A$158 million.

Camelot Resources was renamed Pacmin Mining in June 1998 and took control of all assets of the two companies in Australia. Pacmin was then taken over by Sons of Gwalia in October 2001 for A$210 million, the mine thereby becoming part of the company's Leonora operations, together with the Gwalia mine. This merger also secured the Carosue Dam mine for Sons of Gwalia.

In February 2004, a pit wall failure caused disruptions to the mine, leading to its eventual closure in September 2004.

In retrospect, the purchase of Pacmin and Tarmoola was seen as very expensive, especially in the light of gold reserve write downs and operational difficulties at the mine.

Sons of Gwalia went into administration on 30 August 2004, following a financial collapse, with debts exceeding $800 million after suffering from falling gold reserves and hedging losses. Sons of Gwalia was Australia's third-largest gold producer and also controlled more than half the world's production of tantalum. At the point of closure, the mine had produced 1.65 million ounces of gold.

St Barbara purchased the mine from insolvent Sons of Gwalia in March 2005 but did not fully reopened the mine thereafter. The company placed the mine on the market in 2007, seeing little value in operating the mine because of high costs of production. St Barbara estimated that it would cost A$700 per ounce to mine at Tarmoola, at an average grade of 1.1 g/t. However, the sale of Tarmoola did not eventuate.

St Barbara explored the option of underground mining at Tarmoola in 2009 and processing the ore at Gwalia. Limited amounts of ore were extracted from the mine as a satellite operation by St Barbara and subsequent owners Saracen and Red 5, with St Barbara mining from 2011 to 2015 and Saracen in 2016 before suspending operations in January 2017. In August 2015, St Barbara announced the sale of the mine to Saracen Mineral Holdings for A$3 million.

In August 2017, Red 5 Limited purchased the Darlot-Centenary Gold Mine from Gold Fields for A$18.5 million, A$12 million of this in cash and the remainder in shares and, at the same time, also purchased the King of the Hills Gold Mine from Saracens Mineral Holdings for A$15.5 million in cash and shares.

Red 5 commenced mining at King of the Hills in early 2018, with ore transported to the Darlot process plant for processing until early 2021, when the company decided to preserve the mine's ore for its new plant.

With the completion of their new processing plant at the King of the Hills mine, Red 5 plans to close down the Darlot process plant in 2022 and instead process the ore from the Darlot's underground operations at the new facility. Red 5 spend A$226 million to redevelop the mine.

On 31 March 2022, underground mining commenced at the mine with gold production scheduled to commence in the second quarter of the year.

== Production ==
Production of the mine:

| Year | Production | Grade | Cost per ounce |
|---|---|---|---|
| 1995-96 | 58,369 ounces | | |
| 2000 | 230,357 ounces | 2.27 g/t | A$287 |
| 2001 | 194,540 ounces | 1.80 g/t | A$379 |
| 2002 ^{[1]} | 150,484 ounces | 1.41 g/t | A$375 |
| 2002-03 ^{[2]} | 237,036 ounces | | A$470 |
| 2003–04 ^{[2]} | 165,802 ounces | | A$476 |
| 2004–05 | | | |
| 2005–2011 | inactive | | |
| 2011–12 | | | |
| 2012–13 | | | |
| 2013–14 | | | |
| 2014–15 | | | |
| 2015–16 | | | |
| 2016–17 | | | |
| 2017–18 ^{[3]} | 8,962 ounces | | |
| 2018–19 ^{[3]} | 40,099 ounces | 3.16 g/t | |
| 2019–20 ^{[3]} | 38,075 ounces | 2.71 g/t | |
| 2020–2021 | inactive | | |
| 2021–22 | 9,545 ounces | | |
| 2022–23 | 102,574 ounces^{[4]} | 1.53 g/t | A$1,837 |

== Notes ==
- ^[1]2002 results for January to November only.
- ^[2]Combined result for the Leonora operations, consisting of Gwalia and Tarmoola. The Gwalia mine closed in December 2003.
- ^[3]Figures are for ore mined at King of the Hills and processed at Darlot. Ore stockpiled at King of the Hills not included in figure.
- ^[4]Combined production figure for King of the Hills and Darlot.
