= List of Western Australian government agencies =

Coat of arms of Western Australia

This is a list of agencies, corporations, departments and authorities that are part of the Government of Western Australia.

== Departments, agencies, corporations and authorities ==
List of departments, agencies, corporations and authorities:

=== A ===
Starting with A:

- Albany Port Authority
- Western Australian Alcohol and Drug Authority
- Animal Resources Authority
- Arena Joondalup
- Art Gallery of Western Australia

=== B ===
Starting with B:

- Botanic Gardens and Parks Authority
- Broome Port Authority
- Builders Registration Board of WA
- Building and Construction Industry Training Fund
- Building Disputes Tribunal
- Bunbury Port Authority
- Bunbury Water Board
- Burswood Park Board
- Busselton Water Board

=== C ===
Starting with C:

- C. Y. O'Connor Institute
- Central TAFE
- Central West TAFE
- Challenge Stadium
- Challenger TAFE
- ChemCentre
- Childrens Court
- Commissioner for Children and Young People
- Commissioner for Occupational Safety and Health
- Conservation Commission
- Corruption and Crime Commission
- Country Housing Authority
- Curriculum Council
- Curtin University of Technology

=== D ===
Starting with D:

- Dampier Port Authority
- Department of Biodiversity, Conservation and Attractions
- Department of Communities
- Department of Education
- Department of Finance
- Department of Fire and Emergency Services
- Department of Health
- Department of Jobs, Tourism, Science and Innovation
- Department of Justice
- Department of Local Government, Sport & Cultural Industries
- Department of Mines, Industry Regulation and Safety
- Department of Planning, Lands & Heritage
- Department of Premier and Cabinet
- Department of Primary Industries and Regional Development
- Department of the Registrar Western Australian Industrial Relations Commission
- Department of Training and Workforce Development
- Department of Transport & Major Infrastructure
- Department of Treasury
- Department of Water and Environmental Regulation
- DevelopmentWA
- Director of Equal Opportunity in Public Employment
- Disability Services Commission
- District Court of Western Australia
- Drug and Alcohol Office

=== E ===
Starting with E:

- Economic Regulation Authority (WA)
- Edith Cowan University
- Electoral Commission, Western Australian
- Electorate Offices
- Electricity Generation Corporation
- Electricity Networks Corporation
- Electricity Retail Corporation
- Equal Opportunity Commission
- Esperance Port Authority

=== F ===
Starting with F:

- Family and Domestic Violence Unit
- Family Court of Western Australia
- Fire and Emergency Services Authority
- Forest Products Commission
- Fremantle Ports

=== G ===
Starting with G:

- Gas Disputes Arbitrator, Western Australia
- Gascoyne Development Commission
- Gold Corporation
- Goldfields Esperance Development Commission
- Government Employees Superannuation Board
- Governor of Western Australia
- Great Southern Development Commission
- Great Southern TAFE
- Greyhound Racing Association, Western Australian

=== H ===
Starting with H:

- Health Promotion Foundation Western Australia
- Heritage Council of Western Australia
- Horizon Power
- Housing Authority

=== I ===
Starting with I:

- Independent Market Operator
- Insurance Commission of Western Australia

=== K ===
Starting with K:

- Kimberley Development Commission
- Kimberley TAFE

=== L ===
Starting with L:

- Land Surveyors Licensing Board
- Law Compass
- Law Reform Commission of Western Australia
- Legal Aid Western Australia
- Legal Practice Board
- Legislative Assembly
- Legislative Council
- Liquor Commission of Western Australia
- Lotterywest

=== M ===
Starting with M:

- Main Roads Western Australia
- Mental Health Commission
- Metropolitan Cemeteries Board
- Metropolitan Redevelopment Authority (Operating under DevelopmentWA)
- Mid West Development Commission
- Midvale SpeedDome
- Minerals and Energy Research Institute of Western Australia
- Murdoch University

=== N ===
Starting with N:

- Nurses and Midwives Board of Western Australia
- North Metropolitan TAFE

=== O ===
Starting with O:

- Office of Aboriginal Health
- Office of the Appeals Convenor
- Office of the Auditor General
- Office of the Chief Nursing Officer
- Office of Chief Psychiatrist
- Office for Children & Youth
- Office of Crime Prevention
- Office of the Custodial Inspector
- Office of Development Approvals Coordination
- Office of the Director of Public Prosecutions
- Office of E-Government
- Office of Energy
- Office of Equal Employment Opportunity
- Office of Government Procurement
- Office of Health Review
- Office of the Information Commissioner
- Office of the Inspector of Custodial Services
- Office of Multicultural Interests
- Office of Native Title
- Office of the Ombudsman
- Office of Population Health Genomics
- Office of the Public Advocate
- Office of the Public Sector Standards Commissioner
- Office of Road Safety
- Office of Safety and Quality in Health Care
- Office of Shared Services
- Office of the State Coroner
- Office of State Revenue
- Office of State Security and Emergency Coordination
- Office of Training Accreditation Council
- Office for Women's Policy
- Office for Youth

=== P ===
Starting with P:

- Painters Registration Board
- Parliament of Western Australia
- Parliamentary Commissioner for Administrative Investigations
- Parliamentary Inspector of the Corruption and Crime Commission
- Parliamentary Services Department
- Peel Development Commission
- Perth Market Authority
- Perth Motorplex
- Perth Observatory
- Perth Theatre Trust
- Pharmaceutical Council of Western Australia
- Pilbara Development Commission
- Pilbara TAFE
- Western Australian Planning Commission
- Port Hedland Port Authority
- Potato Marketing Corporation of Western Australia
- Public Sector Commission
- Public Transport Authority
- Public Trust Office

=== R ===
Starting with R:

- Racing and Wagering Western Australia
- Regional Power Corporation
- River Guardians
- Rockingham Development Office
- Rottnest Island Authority
- Rural Business Development Corporation

=== S ===
Starting with S:

- Salaries and Allowances Tribunal
- School Curriculum and Standards Authority
- ScreenWest
- Seniors Card Centre
- Seniors Contact
- Small Business Development Corporation
- Small Business Solutions
- Solicitor General
- South West Development Commission
- South West Institute of Technology
- State Administrative Tribunal
- State Law Publisher
- State Library of Western Australia
- State Records Office of Western Australia
- Supreme Court of Western Australia
- Sustainable Energy Development Office
- Swan River Trust
- Swan TAFE
- Synergy Energy

=== T ===
Starting with T:

- Teacher Registration Board of Western Australia
- The National Trust of Australia (Western Australia)

=== U ===
- University of Western Australia

=== V ===
Starting with V:

- Valuer General
- VenuesWest
- Verve Energy
- Veterinary Surgeons Board

=== W ===
Starting with W:

- Waste Authority
- Water Corporation
- West Coast TAFE
- Western Australia Gas Disputes Arbitrator
- Western Australia Police Service
- Western Australian Alcohol and Drug Authority
- Western Australian Building Management Authority
- Western Australian College of Teaching
- Western Australian Electoral Commission
- Western Australian Greyhound Racing Association
- Western Australian Institute of Sport
- Western Australian Land Authority trading as DevelopmentWA
- Western Australian Land Information Authority (Landgate)
- Western Australian Museum
- Western Australian Planning Commission
- Western Australian Tourism Commission
- Western Power Corporation
- Wheatbelt Development Commission
- WorkCover Western Australia Authority
- WorkSafe

=== Z ===
Starting with Z:

- Zoological Parks Authority

== See also ==
- List of Western Australian courts and tribunals
