= Western Australian Goldfields =

Gold mining areas in Western Australia

The Western Australian Goldfields is a term for areas in Western Australia that have had significant areas of gold mining occur.

== Range of goldfields ==
There are goldfields across the state of Western Australia that area included in the range of Mineral fields of Western Australia, from the Kimberley region to the south coast.

Designated goldfields in Western Australia have included:

== Mid West region ==
- Ashburton Goldfield
- East Murchison Goldfield
- Gascoyne Goldfield
- Murchison Goldfield

== Goldfields region ==
- Broad Arrow Goldfield
- Coolgardie Goldfield
- East Coolgardie Goldfield
- North East Coolgardie Goldfield
- North Coolgardie Goldfield
- Yilgarn Goldfield

== Goldfields to Eastern Goldfields ==
In the 1890s the goldfields term was used for country between Southern Cross and Coolgardie, however as the gold fields extended to Kalgoorlie and beyond, the term Eastern Goldfields was used for the locations in vicinity of Kalgoorlie at that stage.

Sometimes West Australian Goldfields, even the goldfields or Eastern Goldfields is a term that has been used to either identify the region surrounding Kalgoorlie-Boulder within the current broader designated region of Goldfields-Esperance in Western Australia.

The term has been used in books specifically referring to the Kalgoorlie region.

The term has been used in government reports as a reference for all of the goldfields found in Western Australia.

The term has been used in company names.

== Kimberley goldfield ==
The Kimberley goldfield was proclaimed in 1886.

The Kimberley goldfield was relatively short lived, mainly the rush period of the 1880s and 1890s being the notable era on the field.

== Pilbara goldfield ==
See The Pilbarra Goldfield News

== See also ==
- Western Australia Atlas of mineral deposits and petroleum fields
- Western Australian gold rushes
