= Geological Survey of Victoria =

Government agency of Victoria, Australia

Agency overview
- Formed: 1852
- Jurisdiction: Victoria State Government
- Website: https://earthresources.vic.gov.au/geology-exploration/geological-survey-victoria

Geological Survey of Victoria (GSV) is a government agency responsible for mapping the geology of Victoria, Australia.

The Geological Survey was founded in the 1852 in the Victorian gold rush era, and proceeded to actively explore the state of Victoria for geological and mineral resources, discovering and mapping extensive gold, brown coal and petroleum resources.

Originally a core element of the Mines Department, it was later folded into the Department of Primary Industries [DPI]. It is now part of the Earth Resources branch of the Department of Jobs, Precincts and Regions.

Victoria's mineral, petroleum, extractive and geothermal industries are managed by DPI. The DPI regulates the industries, promotes the development of the state's earth resources, maintains the earth resources database and provides scientific and strategic policy advice to government. The DPI also provides licensing, monitors environmental standards and reviews significant projects.

Following its move to DPI, the GSV commenced a major and original program of research and remapping of the state, incorporating new understanding of the state's tectonic origins, producing a new series of seamless digital maps and a publicly available database of earth sciences data.

In mid-2012, cuts to the Victorian public service announced by the Baillieu government resulted in almost half of the GSV staff being retrenched, as a result of which it lost the capability to undertake original research on a meaningful scale, and its 'mission' was redefined as no more than a source of government earth science data. It is now only able to mine data it already has.

== See also ==
- Geoscience Australia
- Geological Survey of South Australia
- Geological Survey of Western Australia
