= Department of Jobs, Tourism, Science and Innovation =

Western Australian government department

Department overview
- Formed: 1 July 2017
- Preceding agencies: Department of State Development; Department of Commerce; Western Australian Tourism Commission
- Dissolved: 30 June 2025
- Superseding Department: Department of Energy & Economic Diversification
- Jurisdiction: Government of Western Australia
- Headquarters: 1 William Street, Perth
- Department executive: Rebecca Brown, Director General
- Website: www.wa.gov.au/organisation/department-of-jobs-tourism-science-and-innovation

The Department of Jobs, Tourism, Science and Innovation is a department of the Government of Western Australia. The department was formed on 1 July 2017, out of the former Department of State Development, the industry promotion and innovation functions of the Department of Commerce and the Western Australian Tourism Commission.

A restructuring of the Western Australian government departments was part of Mark McGowan's 2021 Western Australian state election campaign and, in the month after taking office, the number of government departments was reduced from 41 to 25.

The department is responsible for the portfolios of economic development, international trade and investment, tourism as well as the promotion of the defence, international education, science and innovation sectors.

In May 2021, the department was one of eight Western Australian Government departments to receive a new Director General with Rebecca Brown being appointed to the role.

On 1 July 2025, it will take on extra responsibilities from the Department of Energy, Mines, Industry Regulation & Safety and become the Department of Energy & Economic Diversification. It will lose some responsibilities to the Department of Creative Industries, Tourism & Sport and Department of the Premier & Cabinet.
