= Department of State Development (Western Australia) =

Government department of Western Australia

Agency overview
- Formed: 1 January 2009
- Preceding agencies: Department of Industry and Resources; Department of Consumer and Employment Protection
- Dissolved: 1 July 2017
- Superseding agency: Department of Jobs, Tourism, Science and Innovation
- Jurisdiction: Government of Western Australia
- Agency executive: Steve Wood, Director General
- Website: www.dsd.wa.gov.au/

The Department of State Development was a department of the Government of Western Australia. The department was formed on 1 January 2009, out of the former Department of Industry and Resources and Department of Consumer and Employment Protection, which were split into three new departments, the Department of State Development, the Department of Mines and Petroleum and the Department of Commerce.

On 1 July 2017, the department was amalgamated with the industry promotion and innovation functions sub-departments of the Department of Commerce and the Western Australian Tourism Commission to form the Department of Jobs, Tourism, Science and Innovation.
