= ICWA =

ICWA may refer to:

- The Indian Child Welfare Act
- Institute of Cost and Works Accountants of India, renamed as the Institute of Cost Accountants Of India (ICMAI)
- Chartered Institute of Management Accountants, the renamed Institute of Cost and Works Accountants in the UK
- The Indian Council of World Affairs
- The Insurance Commission of Western Australia, the sole compulsory insurer for motor vehicle personal injuries in Western Australia
- The Institute of Current World Affairs
- International Catch Wrestling Alliance, a European wrestling federation, based in Laventie in the Hauts-de-France
