= List of acts of the Parliament of Western Australia from 1974 =

This is a list of acts of the Parliament of Western Australia for the year 1974.

== 1974 ==
Short title, or popular name	Citation	Royal assent
Long title
Supply Act 1974	No. 1 of 1974	21 August 1974
An Act to apply out of the Consolidated Revenue Fund the sum of Three Hundred and Fifteen Million Dollars and from Moneys to Credit of the General Loan Fund Thirty Million Dollars, to the Service of the Year ending 30th June, 1975, and to apply out of the Public Account the Sum of Five Million Dollars for the purpose of temporary Advances to be made by the Treasurer.
Constitutional Convention Act 1974	No. 10 of 1974	27 September 1974
An Act relating to delegates to the Australian Constitutional Convention and to incidental and other matters.
Daylight Saving Act 1974	No. 13 of 1974	27 September 1974
An Act to promote the earlier use of daylight in a certain period; to repeal the Daylight Saving Act, 1946; (Note: Daylight Saving Act 1946 (No. 16)) to provide for a referendum of the question whether standard time within the State should be altered to promote the earlier use of daylight for certain further periods on a permanent basis; to provide, if a majority of the electors answers the question in the affirmative, that standard time throughout the State should be so altered during those certain further periods; and for incidental and other purposes.
Dongara–Eneabba Railway Act 1974	No. 24 of 1974	23 October 1974
An Act to Authorize the Construction of a railway from the Guildford–Greenough Flats Railway at Dongara to Eneabba.
Western Australian Institute of Technology Act Amendment Act 1974	No. 31 of 1974	4 November 1974
An Act to amend the Western Australian Institute of Technology Act, 1966-1971. (Note: Western Australian Institute of Technology Act 1966 (No. 94))
Alcohol and Drug Authority Act 1974 or the Alcohol and Other Drugs Act 1974	No. 32 of 1974	4 November 1974
An Act for the purposes of constituting a body corporate with the functions of providing treatment, management, care, and rehabilitation of persons who are suffering from the consumption or use of alcoholic or other intoxicating liquors or drugs to excess; promoting and subsidising research and educational facilities directed at prevention and treatment of alcohol and drug abuse, and with further functions related thereto, and for incidental and other purposes.
Perth Mint Act Amendment Act 1974	No. 42 of 1974	18 November 1974
An Act to amend section 20 of the Perth Mint Act, 1970. (Note: Perth Mint Act 1970 (No. 23))
Road Traffic Act 1974	No. 59 of 1974	3 December 1974
An Act to consolidate and amend the law relating to road traffic; to repeal the Traffic Act, 1919-1974 (Note: Traffic Act 1919 (No. 60)) and for incidental and other purposes.
Perpetual Executors, Trustees and Agency Company (W.A.) Limited Act Amendment Act 1974	No. 84 of 1974	10 December 1974
An Act to repeal and re-enact section 16, and to amend sections 21A and 21B, of The Perpetual Executors, Trustees and Agency Company (W.A.) Limited Act, 1922-1969. (Note: Perpetual Executors, Trustees, and Agency Company (W.A.) Limited Act 1922 (Private Act of 1923))
West Australian Trustee Executor and Agency Company Limited Act Amendment Act 1974	No. 85 of 1974	10 December 1974
An Act to repeal and re-enact section 16, and to amend sections 21A and 21B, of The West Australian Trustee Executor and Agency Company Limited Act, 1893-1969. (Note: West Australian Trustee Executor and Agency Company Limited Act 1893 (56 Vict. Private Act))
	No. X of 1974	
Appropriation Act (Consolidated Revenue Fund) 1974-75	No. 88 of 1974	10 December 1974
An Act to appropriate and apply out of the Consolidated Revenue Fund and from the Public Account certain sums to make good the supplies granted for the service of the year ending the 30th day of June, 1975, and to supplement grants made by the previous Parliament during the fourth Session in adjustment of the Vote "Advance to Treasurer, 1973-74 ", for charges during the year ended the 30th day of June, 1974; and to approve of certain expenditure under section forty-one of the Forests Act, 1918-1969. (Note: Forests Act 1918 (No. 8 of 1919))

== Sources ==
- "legislation.wa.gov.au".
