= Colin Branch (geologist) =

Australian geologist

Dr Colin Branch B.Sc.(Hons), Ph.D. (Syd), FGSA
- Born: Colin David Branch; 23 May 1936; Sydney, New South Wales
- Education: Newington College; University of Sydney
- Occupation: Geologist
- Spouse: Pamela Valerie (née Ford)
- Children: 1 son, 1 daughter
- Parent(s): Edith Alicia Doris (née Baker) & Kenneth Macquarie Branch

Colin David Branch (born 23 May 1936) is an Australian geologist and former chairman of the Minerals and Energy Research Institute of Western Australia. Branch is a Fellow of The Geological Society of Australia.

== Early life ==
Branch was born in Sydney, New South Wales, the son of Edith Alicia Doris (née Baker) and Kenneth Macquarie Branch. His father was an architect and honorary carillonist at the University of Sydney. He attended Newington College in 1951 and 1952. In 1956 he was awarded a Bachelor of Science (Honours) from the University Sydney. In 1962 he became a Doctor of Philosophy.

== Geological career ==
Branch was a field geologist with the Bureau of Mineral Resources (BMR) from 1957 until 1962. He was senior volcanologist with the Department Lands, Mines and Surveys, Rabaul, New Guinea, in 1963 and 1964. In 1965 he returned to Canberra as petrologist-in-charge with the BMR and remained in that role until 1968. In 1969 he was appointed as a senior lecturer in geology at the University of Southern Queensland and in 1970 he became a professor. He moved to Adelaide, South Australia, as professor of geology at the University of South Australia and held that chair until 1976. Branch became director of resources at the Department Mines and Energy, Adelaide, in 1976 and assistant director general of the Department of Mines in Perth in 1987. He has been Chairman of the Minerals and Energy Research Institute, Perth.
