= Department of State Development =

Department of State Development may refer to:

- Department of State Development, Infrastructure & Planning, Queensland
- Department of State Development (South Australia)
- Department of State Development (Western Australia)

== See also ==
- Department of State (disambiguation)
- Department of State Security (disambiguation)
