= Hints to Prospectors and Owners of Treatment Plants =

Booklet published by Government of Western Australia

Hints to Prospectors and Owners of Treatment Plants was a booklet published and distributed to gold prospectors in Australia, although its original focus was Western Australia in the 1930s.

It went to 10 editions and was published until the 1960s. Its main author was identified as the Perth Branch of the Royal Mint of Great Britain. Most editions had a list of major contributors, which included government officials in Western Australia.

The preface indicated the general focus to be:

The owners and operators of Prospecting Areas, Leaseholds, Batteries and Treatment Plants in remote Mining Districts where facilities are few and conditions difficult ... .

== Similar and earlier guides ==
In the era of earlier gold rushes, similar guides had appeared in the 1890s in other states, and in other countries similar books had appeared.

== Origins ==
The Perth Mint's Anthea Harris, at a conference in 1999, summarised the origins of the book: The Perth Mint also has a more recent online summary:

In the 1930s, gold production was at an all time low and the gold price had risen so much that the value of the gold in a sovereign was worth more than its £1 token value. Britain came off the gold standard and sovereigns were no longer minted. This left the Perth Mint operating solely as a refinery; coining operations were at a standstill. The Commonwealth Treasury regarded Perth as too far from the centres of population in the east for it to be given any Australian currency to mint. The Deputy Master (the equivalent of the CEO today), H A Corbet realised that the Mint could help the thousands of prospectors who were driven by unemployment to try their luck. He published Hints to Prospectors and Owners of Treatment Plants in 1933. This was popular all over Australia and grew in size and scope through its ten editions.

== Contents ==
The main subjects considered include:

- Prospecting for Gold
- Preparation of samples for assay
- Recovery of gold amalgam from a battery
- Preparation of battery plates
- Care of battery plates
- Cyanide plants
- Disposal of bullion
- Miners rights and regulations
- Dry blowing
- Use of explosives
- First aid
- Health
- Weights and measures

== Editions ==
- The first edition was 10 pages and was produced in the early 1930s.
- Third edition was in 1933
- Fourth edition in 1934
- Fifth edition in 1934
- Seventh edition in 1935
- Eighth edition in 1946
- Ninth edition, also as a revised edition in 1946 or 1947
- Tenth edition in 1947
- Last edition was produced as the 10th edition again in 1960

== Current information ==
Information is still produced for prospectors in Western Australia by the Department of Mines and Petroleum, and many recent publications follow similar patterns to the earlier guides and booklets but with added aids from more recent technology.

== See also ==
- Gold mining in Western Australia
- Gold Stealing Detective Squad
- Mineral fields of Western Australia
- State Batteries in Western Australia
