= Gold mining in Western Australia =

- Position of Western Australia within Australia highlighted

Location
- State: Western Australia
- Country: Australia

Regulatory authority
- Authority: Department of Mines, Industry Regulation and Safety
- Website: http://www.dmp.wa.gov.au/index.aspx

Production
- Commodity: Gold
- Production: ▼6.8 million troy ounces (212.5 tonnes)
- Value: ▲ A$18.6 billion
- Employees: ▼29,257 (FTE)^{[1]}
- Year: 2022–23

Gold mining in Western Australia is the third largest commodity sector in Western Australia (WA), behind iron ore and LNG, with a value of A$17 billion in 2021–22. The 6.9 million troy ounces (214 tonnes) sold during this time period was the highest amount in 20 years and accounted for almost 70 percent of all gold sold in Australia.

Gold mining in Western Australia dates back to the 1880s but became a significant industry in the 1890s, following gold discoveries at Coolgardie in 1892 and Kalgoorlie in 1893. It reached an early peak in 1903, experienced a revival in the 1930s and a further revival in the 1980s. Between, the industry declined a number of times, such as during the two world wars, experiencing an absolute low point in 1976.

== History ==
=== Early history ===
Major gold mining locations in Western Australia with Perth as a reference

Until the 1880s, the economy of WA was based on wheat, meat and wool. A major change in the colony's fortunes occurred when gold was discovered, and prospectors by the tens of thousands swarmed across the land in a desperate attempt to discover new goldfields.

The first gold rush occurred in 1885 when Charles Hall discovered alluvial gold in the Kimberley region, near the future site of a town named after him. Further alluvial finds occurred across the state during the following five years, with finds in Marble Bar, Southern Cross and Yalgoo. From these discoveries, the prospectors moved further afield.

In 1890, gold was discovered in the Norseman region at Dundas, 22 kilometres (14 mi) south of present-day Norseman, followed in 1894 by a gold discovery near the future town of Norseman itself, by prospector Laurie Sinclair, who named the deposit after his horse, Hardy Norseman.

In 1891, the rush to the Murchison goldfields began when Tom Cue discovered gold at the town which now bears his name. In the years that followed, gold towns such as Abbots, Austin, Barrambie, Big Bell, Day Dawn, Garden Gully, Lennonville, Moyagee, Munarra, Nannine, Peak Hill, Pinnacles, Reedy and Rothsay flourished, only to be abandoned when the mines were worked out.

The major discovery at Coolgardie in 1892, by William Ford and Arthur Bayley, set off a new gold rush. This was accelerated by the discovery the following year by Paddy Hannan, Tom Flanagan and Dan Shea of gold at Kalgoorlie. These early discoveries in the Eastern Goldfields sparked a true gold rush.

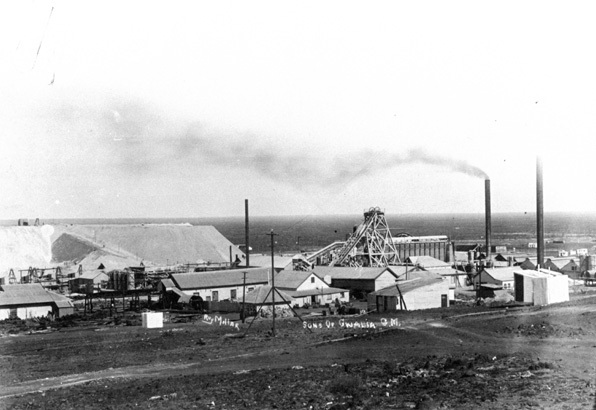
Sons of Gwalia Gold Mine, c. 1921

In 1896, the Sons of Gwalia mine, named after an archaic Welsh name for Wales, Gwalia, was established by Welsh miners. Herbert Hoover, the later President of the United States, served as the mine manager in its early days from May to November 1898.

In 1896, gold was discovered in the Wiluna region, which was then known as Lake Way, by three prospectors, George Woodley, James Wotton and Jimmy Lennon. On 29 December 1897, a 460-troy-ounce (14 kg) nugget was found in Wiluna, then the largest found in the colony of Australia. The location of its discovery was later to become the spot for the powerhouse of the Wiluna Gold Mine Limited, the operators of the early mine.

By the end of the 1890s, more than a third of the colony's population was located in the Eastern Goldfields. The political influence of this population was demonstrated in proposals that the region should become a new, separate colony, with a name such as Auralia, and Coolgardie or Kalgoorlie as its capital. These campaigns accelerated when there was opposition in Perth to Australian Federation. There were calls for "Auralia" to join federation as a separate state.

In many cases, the boom was short-lived, with towns and mines in the Goldfields disappearing quickly, once the surface deposits were depleted. Only where larger companies developed in underground mining did towns survive. By 1903, the gold mining industry in Western Australia reached its peak, and population of the Goldfields started to decline again.

=== First World War ===
The decline of the gold mining industry in Western Australia was reinforced with the outbreak of the First World War. The effects of the war, a large number of miners enlisted in the armed forces and a drying up of overseas investment meant that, by 1920, gold production in the state had fallen to a third of what it was at the height of the boom. A large number of mines in the state had been closed.

=== Great Depression ===
Western Australian gold mining received a boost in the 1930s from the Great Depression. The gold price rose once more, the Commonwealth Government determined to pay a gold bonus and foreign investment increased. Gold mining towns like Wiluna or Kalgoorlie experienced a revival from entrepreneurs like Claude de Bernales. The discovery of the Golden Eagle nugget at Coolgardie in 1931, at the time the largest ever found in Western Australia, attracted many prospectors to return to the state.

=== Second World War ===
The boom started during the Great Depression was short-lived, with the outbreak of the Second World War, the gold mining industry declined once more, for very similar reasons as it had at the beginning of the First World War.

=== Post-war ===
Gold mining temporarily recovered after the war but by the mid-1960s, mining declined once more. By 1976, the Western Australian gold mining industry reached its low point, with production at a level of one tenth of the production in 1900. The Goldfields mining industry was saved by the discovery of Nickel in the region and, by the mid-1980s, gold mining was on the up again, too. New technologies led to the reopening of many mines. Where, at the turn of the 19th century, mining was only profitable at above 15 grams per tonne (0.11 gr/lb) of gold per ore, mines could now operate profitably on grades as low as 1 gram per tonne (0.0070 gr/lb). Mines like the Super Pit at Kalgoorlie now incorporate many former surface and underground operations in one large open pit.

In the more remote mining locations of Western Australia, the work force however has moved away from being residential to a fly-in fly-out roster. This led to the former mining towns not sharing the current boom, with most of the work force residing in Perth, Kalgoorlie or even the capital cities on the east coast and in nearby Indonesia. Population and services in the Goldfields towns are far short of what they were during the golden era of the 1930s.

== Current situation ==
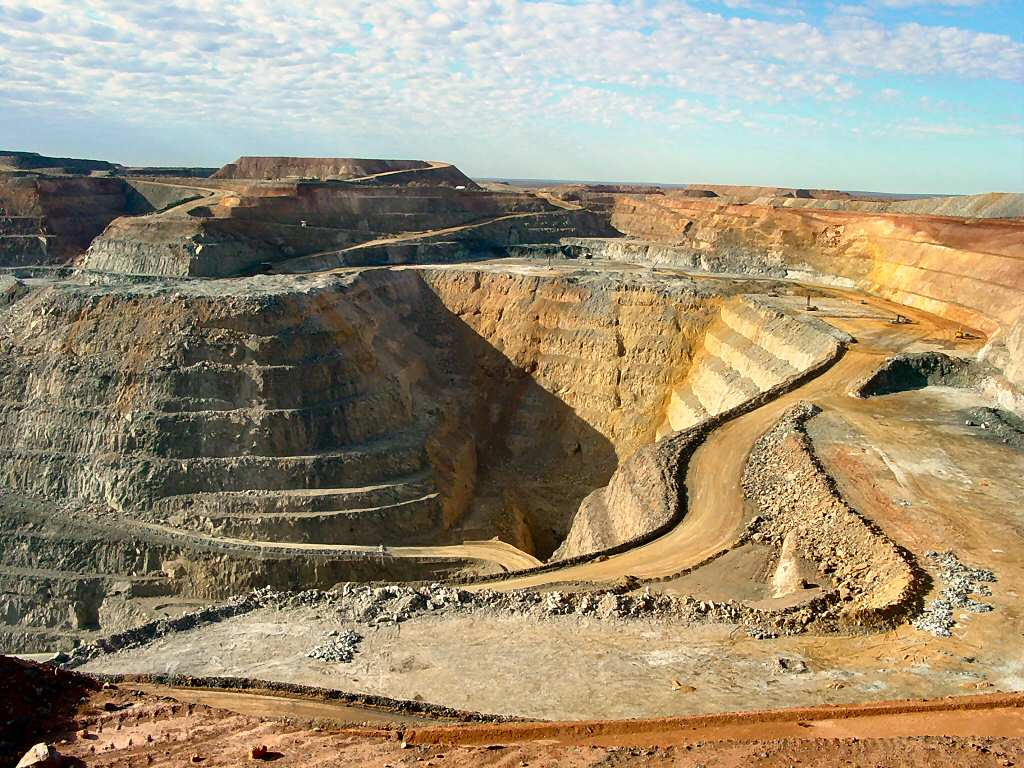
KCGM's Super Pit gold mine on the Golden Mile.

Western Australia produced over 50% ($69.5 billion) of all Australian mineral and petroleum sales, which made up 88% of the state's merchandise exports in 2015–16. In 2015–16, gold was ranked third in the list of resources exported by Western Australia with regard to value, behind iron ore and petroleum, with a value of A$10 billion. The state produced 6.27 million troy ounces of gold, or 195 tonnes, 6% of world production. During 2014-15 the Western Australian gold mining industry directly employed 19,175 people.

By 2008–09, gold had jumped into fourth spot in regards to export value with a value of A$5.2 billion, overtaking alumina. The average gold price was US$874 per ounce in 2008–09, or A$1,171 per ounce, which was 28 per cent higher than the previous year. While the value of sales increased by 25%, the gold output of the state decreased by 4%, to 4.4 million ounces. Western Australia accounted for 62% of Australia's gold production in 2008–09.

In 2008–09, 41% of Western Australia's gold exports went to the United Kingdom, followed by India with 34%. Thailand and the United Arab Emirates hold third spot jointly, with an 8% share.

The Golden Mile, producing 20 tonnes of gold, was Western Australia's top-producing mine in 2008–09, followed by the Telfer with 18.1 tonnes and St Ives with 13.4 tonnes. With a project cost of US$2.9 billion, the Boddington Gold Mine is by far the biggest gold project to commence production in the state in 2009, being capable of produce 900,000 ounces of gold per annum.

The number of people employed in the Western Australian gold mining industry rose to 36,087 in 2021–22.

== Safety ==
Since the late 1960s, when the Department of Mines began categorising fatalities by commodity, until 2019, 143 work-related fatalities have occurred in the gold mining industry in Western Australia.

In the decade from 2001 to 2010, 14 employees lost their lives in the state's gold mining industry. From 2011 to 2019 there were seven gold mining-related fatalities, with 2017 and 2012 the last fatality-free years.

In 2017–2018 the injury incidence rate (lost time injuries per hundred employees) for the Mining Industry division was 1.39—less than Manufacturing (2.41), Agriculture, Forestry and Fishing (2.17), Construction (1.90), Transport, Postal and Wharehousing (1.84), and Wholesale Trade (1.82).

== Gold production ==
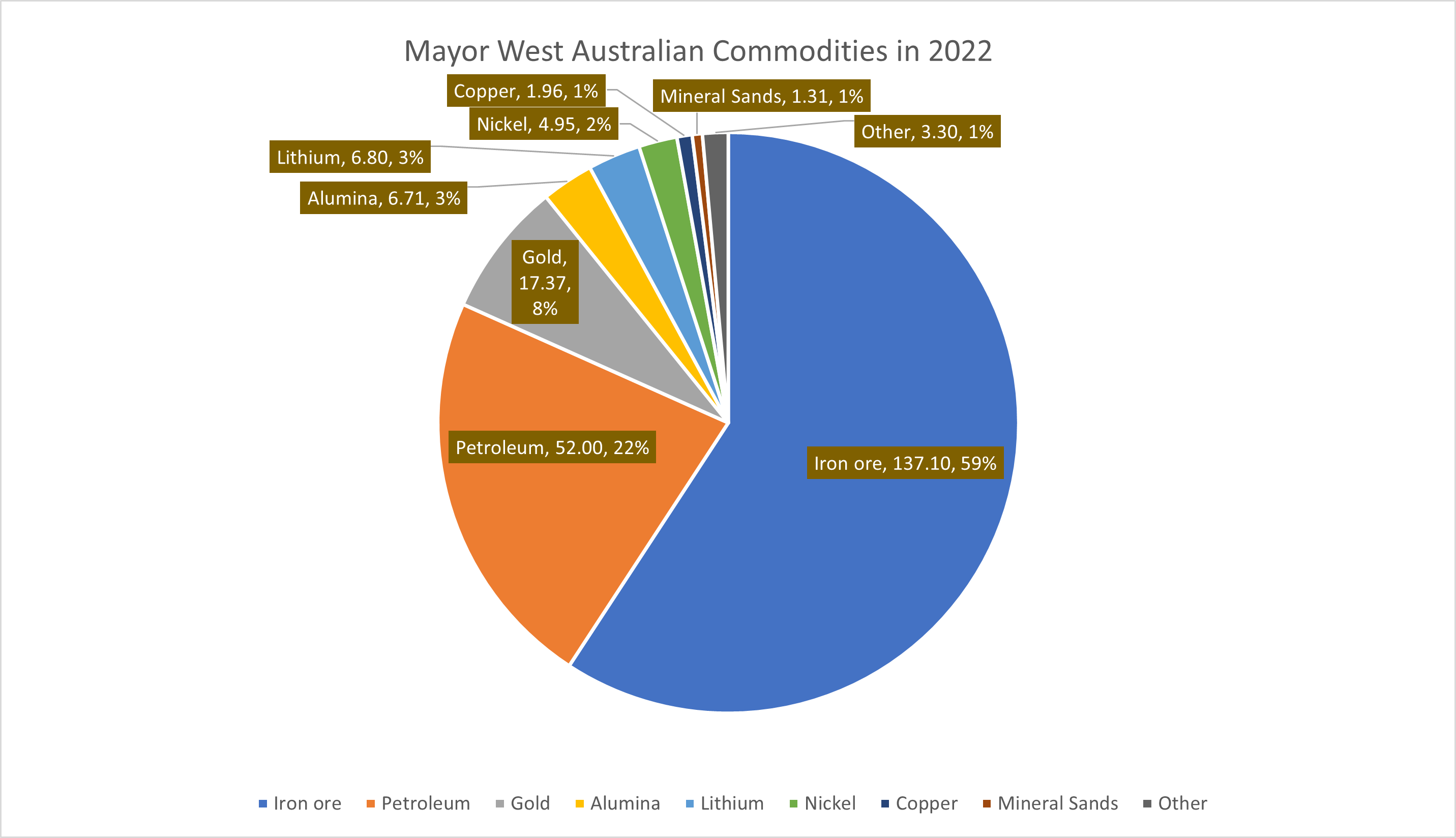
Major West Australian commodities in 2022

Gold production in Western Australia begun in the 1890s, reaching its first peak in 1903, with over 50 tonnes of gold produced annually. Production gradually fell to reach a first low in the late 1920s. At that point, Western Australia was almost the only state in Australia to still produce gold. Production rose once more during the Great Depression, to reach a second peak in 1939.

After a short slump during the war, gold production remained relatively steady until the mid-1960s. From there, it fell to levels not seen since the late 1890s, to reach a low point in 1976. It remained low until the mid-1980s, when a new gold boom hit the state. By 1990, production hit 150 tonnes of gold per year, three times the previous peak of 1903. It reached an all-time record in 2001 with close to 250 tonnes of gold produced that year. Production in 2009 has declined to 142 tonnes per annum.

World gold mine production was at a record in 2001 with 2,640 tonnes produced. Production has fallen since, to 2,415 tonnes in 2008. World gold production is expected to rise in 2009–10, with Australia scheduled to increase production by 15 percent.

As of 2022, Newmont's Boddington gold mine, located in Western Australia, is Australia's biggest producing gold mine.

== Statistics ==
Quarterly expenditure ($millions) on exploration for gold in Western Australia since 1988

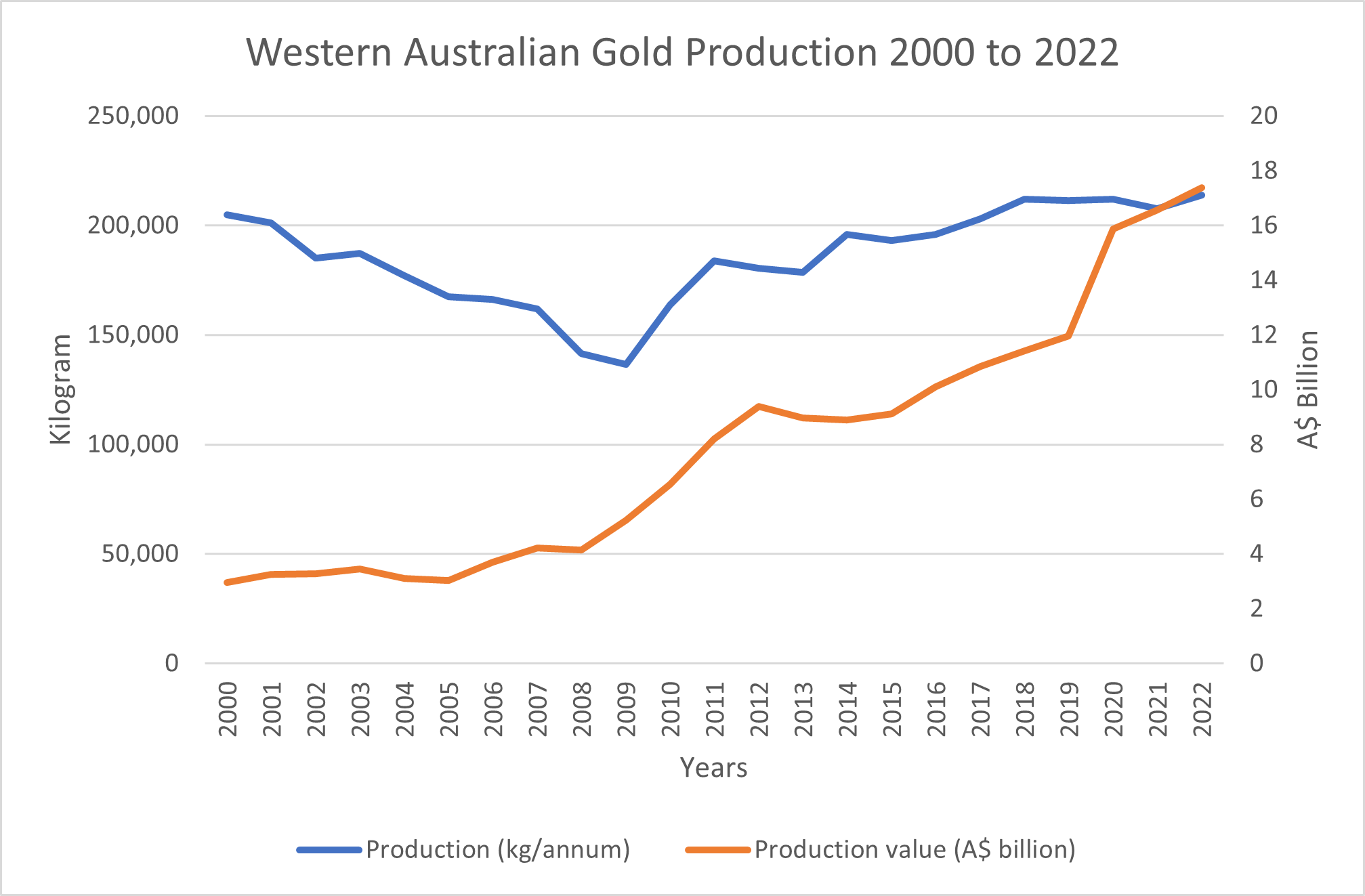
Western Australian gold production and value from 2000 to 2022

Annual statistics for the Western Australian gold mining industry:

Subject	1990	1991	1992	1993	1994	1995	1996	1997	1998	1999
Production (kg/annum)	161,790	181,170	182,040	179,800	193,600	187,850	205,890	228,020	239,460	220,820
Production value (A$ billion)	2.60	2.76	2.69	2.83	3.42	3.13	3.40	3.41	3.47	3.24

Subject	2000	2001	2002	2003	2004	2005	2006	2007	2008	2009
Production (kg/annum)	204,960	201,210	185,000	187,240	177,010	167,350	166,170	161,770	141,480	136,610
Production value (A$ billion)	2.95	3.25	3.28	3.44	3.11	3.02	3.71	4.22	4.14	5.23
Employees	10,879	11,938	12,653	12,801	13,398	12,121	12,314	13,733	14,459	16,686

Subject	2010	2011	2012	2013	2014	2015	2016	2017	2018	2019
Production (kg/annum)	163,830	183,800	180,390	178,680	196,074	193,162	195,968	203,003	212,060	211,534
Production value (A$ billion)	6.55	8.19	9.40	8.97	8.89	9.11	10.11	10.86	11.42	11.96
Employees	16,997	18,859	22,439	20,541	17,337	19,587	23,556	27,075	29,266	31,369

Subject	2020	2021	2022	2023
Production (kg/annum)	212,142	207,567	213,757	212,465
Production value (A$ billion)	15.87	16.57	17.37	18.59
Employees (Full time)	26,287	28,419	30,764	29,257
Employees (all personnel on site)	31,679	34,153	36,087	^{[1]}

== See also ==
- Hints to Prospectors and Owners of Treatment Plants
- Mineral fields of Western Australia
- State Batteries in Western Australia
- Western Australian gold rushes

== Notes ==
- ^[1] Full time employees only. Up until 2022, the Western Australian Mineral and Petroleum Statistics Digest listed a combined figure of both full time employees and on-site personnel but the latter was not included in the 2022–23 edition, which only listed full time employees.
