= Gold Stealing Detection Unit =

Police specialist unit in Western Australia

Agency overview
- Formed: 1907

Jurisdictional structure
- Operations jurisdiction: Western Australia, Australia
- Map of Gold Stealing Detection Unit's jurisdiction
- Area: 2,645,615 km^{2}
- Governing body: Government of Western Australia
- General nature: Civilian police

Operational structure
- Headquarters: Egan Street, Kalgoorlie, WA

Website
- https://www.police.wa.gov.au/Crime/Gold-stealing/Gold-Stealing-Detection-Unit

The Gold Stealing Detection Unit (GSDU), or Gold Stealing Detective Squad (GSDS), is a special unit of the Western Australian Police, based in Kalgoorlie, Western Australia. It investigates criminal activity and allegations at all stages of the gold production process in the state.

The unit consists of a very small number of detectives but is the oldest specialist police service in Western Australia.

== History ==
The squad was formed in 1907, at a time when gold theft was rife in the region. It was formed after Detective Sergeant Kavanagh, in charge of the Kalgoorlie police, submitted a report in 1906 on the seriousness of gold theft in the Eastern Goldfields of Western Australia. A Royal Commission determined in February 1907, that his allegations were justified and a special police service was formed in late 1907.

Previous to this, the Chamber of Mines operated a special service called The Bureau for investigatory services. The Chamber continued to financially support the GSDS. The unit is based now, as it was then, at Egan Street in Kalgoorlie.

== Walsh and Pitman ==
In April 1926, Inspector John Walsh and Sergeant Alexander Pitman of the GSDS were murdered while investigating gold theft. Their bodies were dumped down the Belle of Kalgoorlie mine shaft at Miller's Find, Binduli, near Kalgoorlie. The murders and the subsequent press reporting about the limited resources available to the GSDS at the time had a similar effect of the 1907 reporting of issues. The lengthy investigation, eventual capture, and execution of the murderers, William Coulter and Phillip Trefene, was of considerable interest to the Perth press at the time.

Walsh's and Pitman's funeral in Perth on 17 May 1926 was a procession watched by thousands, and attended by a large number of police officers. The memorial to the two policemen was originally of low interest; however, in the year of the state's centenary it was unveiled by the Governor. The memorial was originally erected outside the police building in James Street, Perth, moved for a time to the WA Police Headquarters, and is now located in the WA Police Academy at Joondalup.

== Recent history ==
The squad was part of the Western Australian Police Department until 31 May 1995, when the latter became the Western Australia Police Service.

On 2 October 2007, the unit celebrated its centenary in Kalgoorlie Town Hall.

As 70% of all gold mined in Australia is produced from Western Australia, gold mining is an important industry in the state and it is a requirement for anybody to work in the industry to obtain a GSDU clearance certificate. In 2017, 210 tonnes of gold were mined in Western Australia, worth A$11.2 billion to the state economy.

== Current functions ==
The GSDU provides the only regular police service to many of the isolated mines in Western Australia.

The functions of the GSDU continue many of the 1907 GSDS functions, including the provision of clearance certificates for prospective mine workers, inspections, advice and education, and its main role for 100 years, detection and prosecution of gold theft.

The GSDU currently consists of six detectives, funded by the WA Chamber of Mines.

== Recent operations ==
In October 2004, the GSDU arrested six men in Norseman and charged them with offences ranging from stealing to possession of unlicensed firearms.

In January 2009, GSDU charged six men with theft of safety equipment at mines.

In December 2013 the GSDU investigated a clandestine gold processing plant in suburban Kalgoorlie, reminiscent of the means by which gold stealers operated in the early years of the 20th century. Similarly the squad and other police were involved in late 2023 and early 2024 with investigating in town processing plants.

A criminal case against two alleged gold thieves was thrown out in August 2024 after a error in the specialist forensic analysis.

== See also ==
- List of active gold mines in Western Australia
- Hints to Prospectors and Owners of Treatment Plants
