= State Batteries in Western Australia =

Government ore-crushing facilities

State Batteries in Western Australia were government owned and run ore-crushing facilities for the gold mining industry. Western Australia was the only Australian state to provide batteries to assist gold prospectors and small mines. They existed in almost all of the mineral fields of Western Australia.

State Batteries were gold batteries where ore was crushed to separate gold ore. Stamp mills were gauged by the number of heads they had in operation for the crushing of ore.

Many of the government operated batteries had very short operating times, some for a year or two, while a few were 50 years or more in operation. They were part of the Western Australian Department of Mines operations.

== Origins ==
The first private battery in Kalgoorlie was constructed at the Croesus mine in 1894. As early as 1897 there was consideration of ore-crushing facilities being funded by private or government means. The first government battery was constructed at Norseman in 1898. But by 1906 there was a Batteries Inquiry Board.

== Decline ==
In the 1930s, despite the depression, a significant number still operated. There were close to 100 operating Batteries in Western Australia – either private or Government in 1949, and by 1958 there were less than 50. Currently there are no operating state batteries, but ore processing continues in some of the same locations, such as Tuckabianna.

By 1982 a Government review of State Battery operations eventuated in a functional review, and the eventual closure of State Batteries in 1987.

== List ==
The following State Batteries are known to have existed in Western Australia.

- Bamboo 1913–1962
- Black Range-. see also Sandstone
- Bulong 1898–1899
- Carlaminda
- Coolgardie 1904
- Cue 1919–1968
- Darlot 1901-1980s
- Desdemona 1909–1912
- Devon 1908–?
- Donnybrook 1900–1904
- Duketon 1905–1907
- Dumpling Gully
- Kalgoorlie 1932
- Kalpini 1906–1911
- Laverton 1902 Known to be operating between 1916 and 1941.
- Leonora 1898
- Linden 1908
- Marble Bar 1910–?
- Marvel Loch – Known to be operating between 1912 and 1950
- Meekatharra 1901–
- Messenger's Patch 1909–?
- Menzies 1904 – ?
- Mt Egerton State Battery 1912–1921
- Mt Ida 1898–1953
- Mt Jackson 1912–1921
- Mt Keith 1913–1928
- Mt Sir Samuel 1910–1921
- Mulline 1898–1921
- Mulwarrie 1901–1920
- Nannine 1907–1912
- Niagara 1900–1922
- Norseman 1898–? modernised in 1950
- Ora Banda 1913–?
- Paddington 1903–?
- Paynes Find 1912–?
- Paynesville 1900–1902
- Pig well 1904–1912
- Pinjin 1905–1914
- Quinns 1911–1920
- Randalls 1905–1908
- Ravelstone -Peak Hill 1917–1965
- Ravensthorpe ? –
- Sandstone 1911
- South Greenbushes 1906
- Southern Cross 1903–1905
- Tuckabianna 1918–?
- Tuckanurra 1898–1923
- Warriedar 1940 ?
- Widgiemooltha 1900–1911
- Wiluna 1904–1950
- Yalgoo 1898–1941
- Yarri 1905–?
- Yerilla 1898–1920
- Youanmi 1909–1940
- Yundamindera 1903–1907

== See also ==
- Hints to Prospectors and Owners of Treatment Plants
