= Department of Mines and Petroleum =

Former government department of Western Australia

Agency overview
- Formed: 1 January 2009
- Preceding agencies: Department of Industry & Resources; Department of Consumer & Employment Protection
- Dissolved: 1 July 2017
- Superseding agency: Department of Mines, Industry Regulation & Safety
- Jurisdiction: Government of Western Australia
- Agency executive: Richard Sellers, Director General
- Website: www.dmp.wa.gov.au/index.aspx

The Department of Mines and Petroleum was a department of the Government of Western Australia until it was superseded by the Department of Mines, Industry Regulation & Safety on 1 July 2017. The department was formed on 1 January 2009, out of the former Department of Industry & Resources and Department of Consumer & Employment Protection, which were split into three new departments, the Department of Mines & Petroleum, the Department of State Development and the Department of Commerce.

Its focus is the resources sector, maintaining a mining and petroleum regulatory role and incorporating the resources safety responsibilities from the former Department of Consumer & Employment Protection. It also oversees the Geological Survey of Western Australia.

The department operates the Mindex website, a continuously updated database containing information on mines, mineral deposits and prospects in Western Australia.

== Earlier history ==
The original Department of Mines was created on 1 January 1894 and ceased in that name on 1 July 1992 when it became the Department of Minerals and Energy.

During the 1894 - 1992 era, the department was originally divided into branches:

- Registration
- Accounts Correspondence
- Drafting
- Government Geologist (1896 was known as the Geological Survey Branch.

Before the change of 1992, the branches had become divisions:

- Geological Survey
- Mining Engineering
- Petroleum (usually known as the Petroleum Operations Division)
- Government Chemical Laboratories
- Corporate Services
- Explosives and Dangerous Goods
- Mining Registration
- Surveys & Mapping

== 2000s ==
On 1 July 2001 Department of Minerals and Energy and the Department of Resources Development were merged to form the Department of Mineral and Petroleum Resources.

Further to a review in 2003 the department was merged with the Department of Industry and Technology to form the Department of Industry and Resources on 3 February 2003.

This department was divided into business groups:

- Mineral and Petroleum Resources
- Business and Trade Services
- Investment Services

The department was changed again on 1 January 2009 and three new departments were formed:

- Department of Mines and Petroleum
- Department of State Development
- Department of Commerce (which included the Science and Innovation functions of the Department of Industry and Resources)

== See also ==
- Mining in Western Australia
- Regions of Western Australia
- State Batteries in Western Australia
- Western Australia Atlas of mineral deposits and petroleum fields
