= Mining in Western Australia =

- Position of Western Australia within Australia highlighted

Location
- State: Western Australia
- Country: Australia

Regulatory authority
- Authority: Department of Mines, Industry Regulation and Safety
- Website: Department of Mines, Industry Regulation and Safety

Production
- Commodity: Iron ore ▲861.3 million tonnes; Gold ▼212 tonnes (6.8 million troy ounces); Nickel ▲160,371 tonnes; Alumina ▼13.1 million tonnes; Copper ▼119,128 tonnes; Zinc ▼62,233 tonnes; Lead ▲12,766 tonnes; Salt ▼11.6 million tonnes; Cobalt ▲5,863 tonnes; Diamonds ▼0; Coal ▼4.8 million tonnes
- Value: ▲ A$182.9 billion
- Employees: ▲126,481 (FTE)^{[1]}
- Year: 2022-23

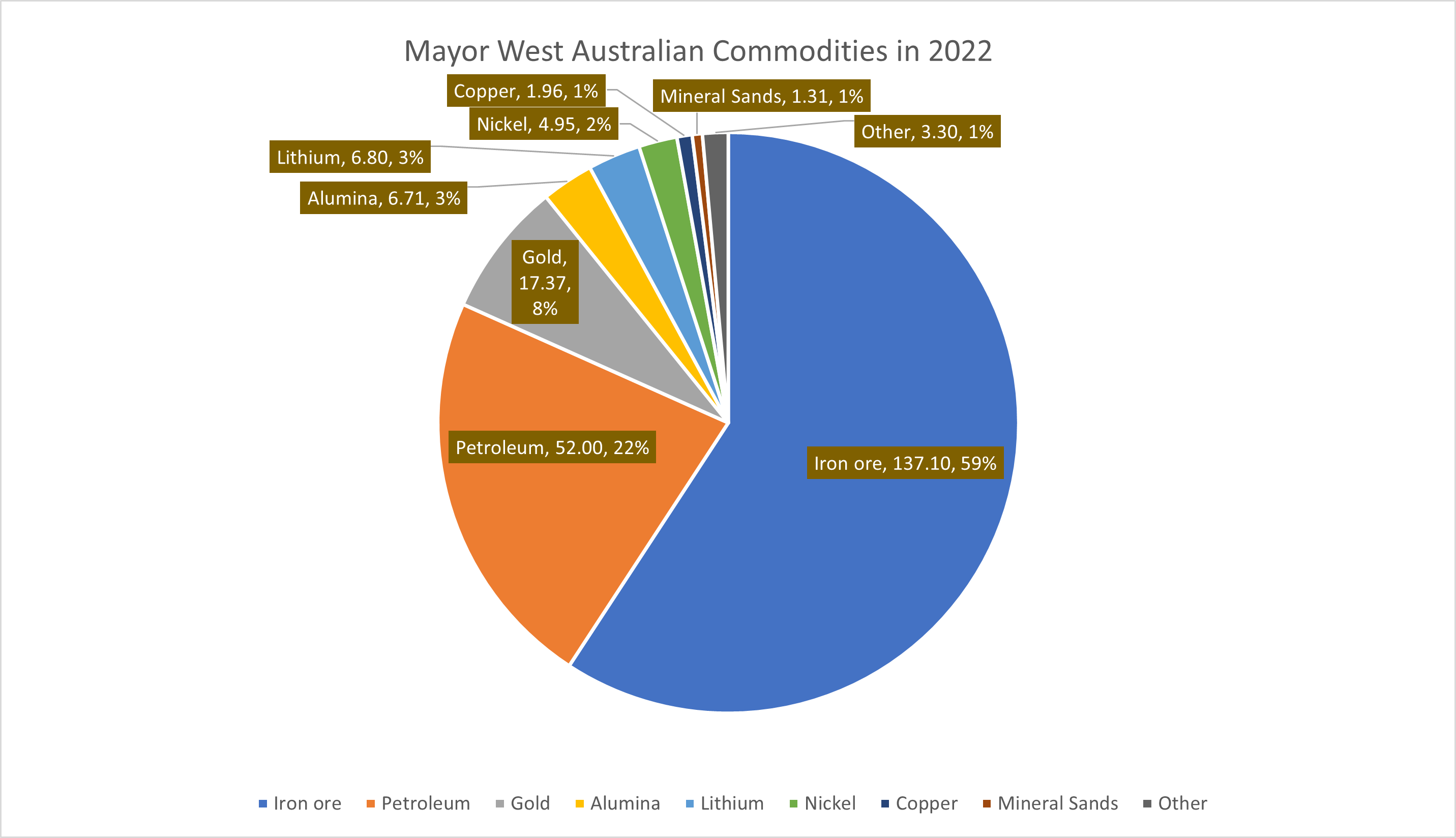
Major West Australian Commodities in 2022

Mining in Western Australia, together with the petroleum industry in the state, accounted for 94% of the State's and 46% of Australia's income from total merchandise exports in 2019–20. The state of Western Australia hosted 123 predominantly higher-value and export-oriented mining projects and hundreds of smaller quarries and mines. The principal projects produced more than 99 per cent of the industry's total sales value.

Western Australia's mineral and petroleum industry, in 2019–20, had a value of $174 billion, up from $145 billion in 2018–19. In comparison, the value of the mineral and petroleum industry in 2005–06 was $43 billion.

Iron ore was, in 2019–20, the most important commodity in Western Australia, accounting for 60 percent of sales in the state's mineral and petroleum industry. The petroleum sector, consisting of oil and gas, followed in second place with 22 percent of the overall value. The third most important commodity in the state was gold, at $16 billion, 9.2 percent of the overall value. Alumina, nickel, and base metals (copper, lead and zinc) followed in order of importance, each achieving a value in excess of A$1 billion. Other major commodities included lithium, mineral sands, salt, coal, cobalt, rare earths, and diamonds.

Employment in the Western Australian mining and petroleum industry has sharply increased over the last decade, from 85,163 in 2010, directly employing an average of 135,001 people during 2019–20. The largest employers were the iron ore (48.5%) and gold (23.4%) sectors.

The industry's regulating authority in Western Australia is the Department of Mines, Industry Regulation and Safety, renamed from the Department of Mines and Petroleum (DMP) on 1 July 2017, which in turn replaced the Department of Industry and Resources (DOIR) on 1 January 2009. The department also produces the annual Western Australian Mineral and Petroleum Statistic Digest and operates the MINDEX website, which is aimed at listing all current and former mining operations in the state.

== History ==
Mining transformed the Western Australian economy. Gold finds in the 1890s brought unprecedented numbers of people and amounts of capital to the state.

Gold mining declined after 1904, and Western Australia went through a painful period of structural adjustment over the course of the following three decades during which time two world wars, an international depression and a major drought complicated the state's economic development. Mining began to take off again in the 1930s, however at the time the state governments' focus was on agricultural expansion and manufacturing initiatives. The primary sector would experience strong growth until the early 1970s, after which it levelled off. More than one million hectares (2.5 million acres) of marginal agricultural land was abandoned, and the government turned to mining as the state's main economic priority.

The period after 1945 has been characterised by the development of the state's mining sector into a world-scale industry and Western Australia's increasing access to the rest of the world. Communication and transport advances brought Western Australia much closer to the rest of the world, providing opportunities for local producers to access markets in other countries much more easily. On the other hand, overseas producers could access the Western Australian market relatively more readily. The outcome has been a highly specialised and trade-dependent Western Australian economy (with mining and mineral processing the dominant industries), using income derived to import many other goods and services.

The state's second major resource boom was stimulated when, in 1960, the Commonwealth Government lifted the iron ore export embargo that had been in place since 1938. Demand was fuelled by the buoyant Japanese economy and Japanese, American and British investment flowed into the state. While Asia had previously been a market for Western Australian products (notably sandalwood and wool), the export of iron ore to Japan marked a fundamental shift in Western Australia's trade dynamic and paved the way for the development of Asia as the state's most important trading region.

Prior to the resurgence of the resource sector, economic conditions had been relatively subdued, with constant-price household income per capita roughly the same in 1960–61 as in 1948–49. However, the mining boom caused income per capita to more than double by 1973–74. Importantly, while iron ore was (and remains) a significant component of the mining industry, one important aspect of the resources boom in the 1960s that set it apart from the gold rush, was the diversity of commodities being mined. There were major discoveries of nickel, petroleum, bauxite and alumina, which all developed into significant industries in the 1960s and 1970s. There was also a major revival in the mining of gold in the 1980s, stimulated by price increases associated with the end of the gold standard in 1971, high inflation throughout the 1970s and new processing technology.

== Timeline ==
- 1848: Lead ore was found by explorer James Perry Walcott, a member of A.C. Gregory's party, near Northampton.
- 1863: Lead and copper ores represent 14% of the colony's total annual exports, exceeded only by wool and sandalwood.
- 1877: Copper and lead ores are the colony's second largest export, still at 14% of the total, after wool.
- 1885: The colony's first gold rush at Halls Creek in the Kimberley district
- 1887: The Yilgarn gold rush around Southern Cross
- 1892: Arthur Bailey and William Ford discover gold at Fly Flat near Coolgardie.
- 17 June 1893: Paddy Hannan discovers gold near Kalgoorlie, sparking Western Australia's gold rush.
- 1899: Sir John Forrest, the first Premier of Western Australia, saw the importance of gold in the development of Western Australia's economy, and successfully lobbied the British Government to establish a branch of the Royal Mint in Perth.
- 1934: A lease was assigned over iron ore deposits at Koolan Island in Yampi Sound off the coast of the Kimberley to the Nippon Mining Company backed by the Japanese government.
- 1935–39: High gold prices encourage investment.
- 1937: Public and government outcry when Nippon Mining proposed not to use Australian labour but to send its own engineers to construct the Koolan Island mine.
- 1939–45: Labour shortages as a result of the Second World War caused many mines to cease operation, and following the war, many did not re-open.
- 1938: Commonwealth government enacts iron ore export embargo. The stated reason for the embargo was doubt as to the adequacy of Australian iron ore resources for Australia's own needs.
- 1940: Extensive survey of iron ore deposits determined only two were commercially viable, one being the Yampi Sound Group.
- 1948: Bureau of Mineral Resources combined with the WA Department of Mines to carry out systematic geological and geophysical surveys in the North West, mostly seeking oil.
- 1960: Commonwealth Government lifts iron ore export embargo.
- 1964: Oil discovered on Barrow Island.
- 1967: Oil production on Barrow Island begins.
- 1969–1970: Poseidon nickel boom
- 1977: Premier Sir Charles Court agreed with Alcoa Australia to take a designated quota of the gas in return for permission to build a third alumina refinery at Wagerup.
- 1981: The Western Australian Government negotiated an agreement to allow development of the large natural gas reserves on the North West Shelf.
- 1987: Black Monday (1987)
- 1989: First liquefied natural gas (LNG) cargo exported to Japan in 1989.
- 2008: 2008 financial crisis - the mining industry placed Australia in a strong economic and fiscal position ahead of the crisis, and helped accelerate the post-crisis recovery.
- August 2009: Gorgon Consortium signs $50 billion contract with PetroChina for gas extraction from the fields around Barrow Island.

== Major commodities ==
Major commodities in Western Australia in order of their 2021–22 sales values:

=== Iron ore ===
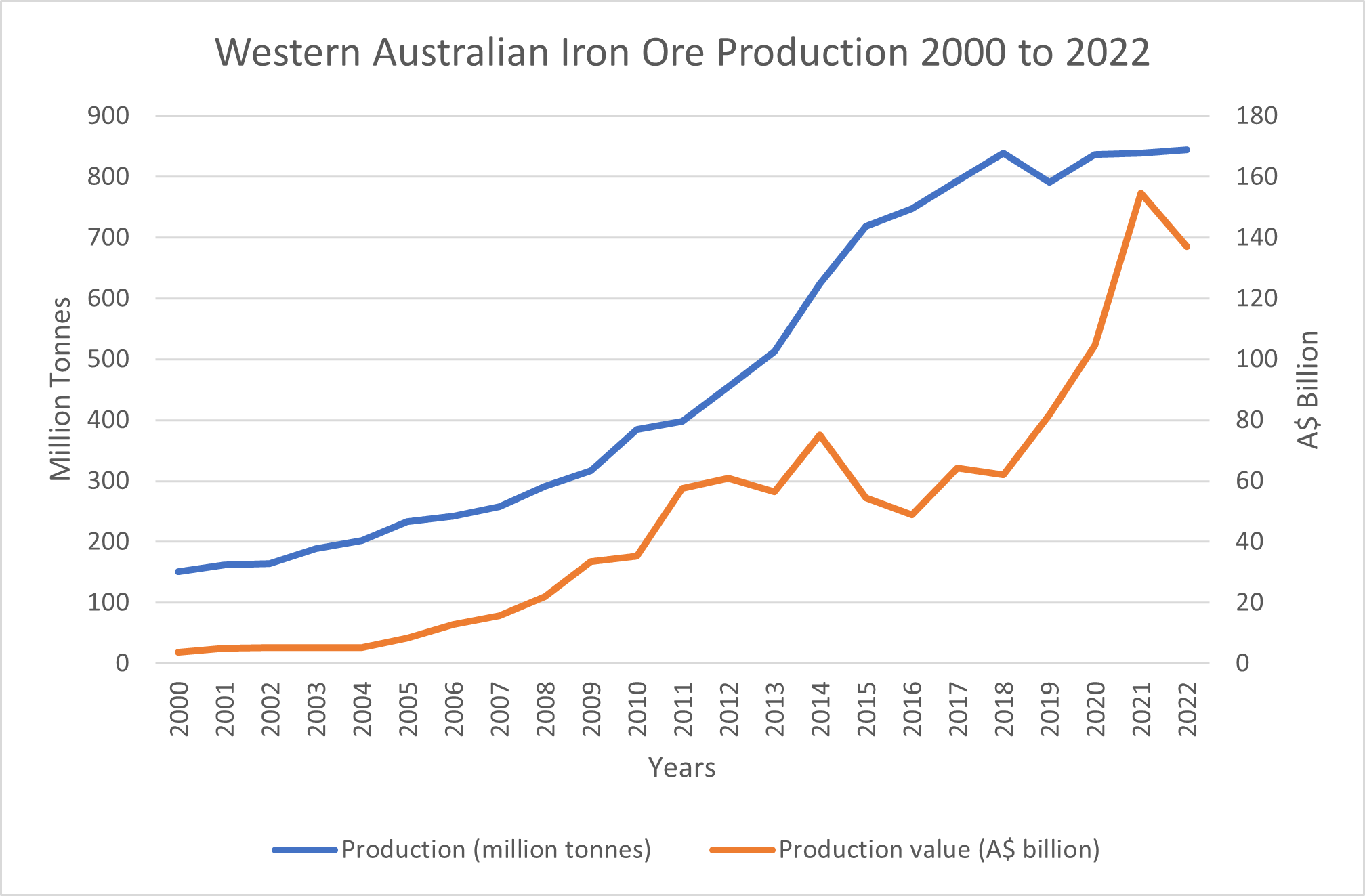
Western Australian Iron Ore production and value from 2000 to 2022

Iron ore mining in Western Australia, in the financial year 2018–19, accounted for 54 percent of the total value of the state's resources exports, with a value of A$78.2 billion. The overall value of the mineral and petroleum industry in Western Australia was A$145 billion in 2018–19. Production of iron ore in Western Australia in 2018–19 was 794 million tonnes (1.8 trillion pounds), down on the previous year's 839 million tonnes (1.8 trillion pounds) of ore, however due to improved iron ore prices, sales of $78.2 billion were up 26 per cent on the previous year, setting a new record for iron ore sales values. The bulk of Western Australian ore went to China, which imported 82 percent of the 2018–19 production, followed by Japan with 7.9 percent.

In the calendar year 2019, the Western Australian Government received A$4.9 billion in royalties from the iron ore mining industry in the state, 288% more than a decade ago in 2009.

Iron ore mining in Western Australia is predominantly, but not exclusively, carried out in the Pilbara region, which produced ore in value of A$76.8 billion in 2018–19, 98 percent of the total for the state.

=== Petroleum ===
Petroleum production was valued at $38.4 billion in 2018–19, an increase of 45 per cent from $26.5 billion in 2017–18.

LNG was the state's most valuable petroleum product, accounting for 20 per cent of all mineral and petroleum sales in 2018–19. Sales reached a record 37.9 million tonnes (84 billion pounds), with values rising from A$18.9 billion in 2017–18 to A$29 billion in 2018–19 (A$6.3 billion in 2009). In 2018–19 crude oil production was down 34 percent to 3.2 gigalitres (20 million barrels), while condensate increased 60 percent to 11.4 gigalitres (3.0 billion US gallons) over the previous year.

=== Gold ===
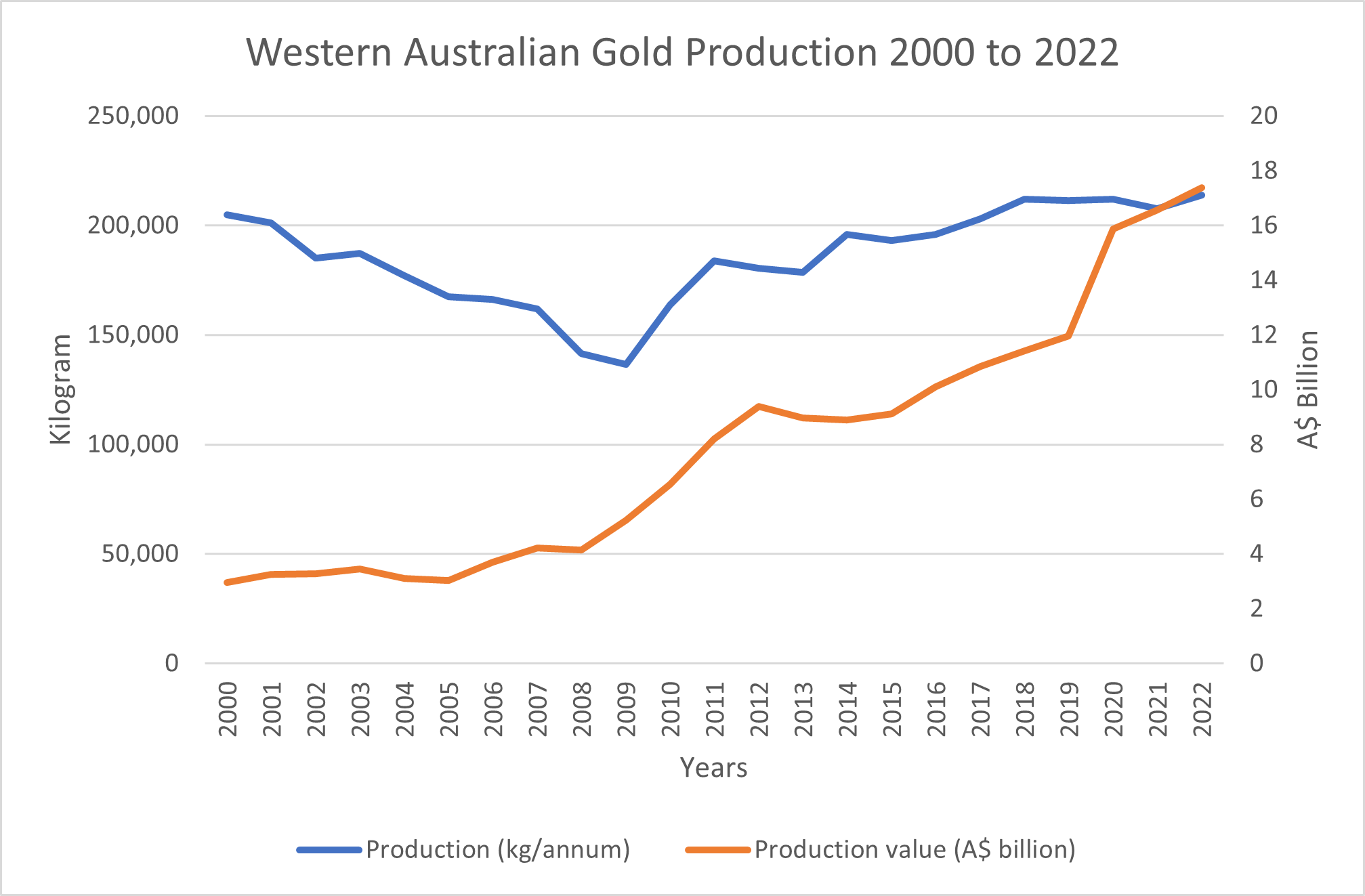
Western Australian Gold production and value from 2000 to 2022

The history of gold mining in Western Australia dates back to the 1880s but took on some larger dimensions in the 1890s, after gold discoveries at Coolgardie in 1892 and Kalgoorlie in 1893. It reached an early peak in 1903, experienced a golden era in the 1930s and a revival in the mid-1980s. In between, the industry declined a number of times, particularly during the two world wars, experiencing an absolute low point in 1976.

In 2018–2019, gold production in the state was steady on the previous year, at 211 tonnes (6.8 million troy ounces), 6.4% of world production, although an improving gold price delivered a 4.6 percent increase in value, from $11.4 billion in 2017–18, to a record annual value of $11.9 billion.

=== Lithium ===
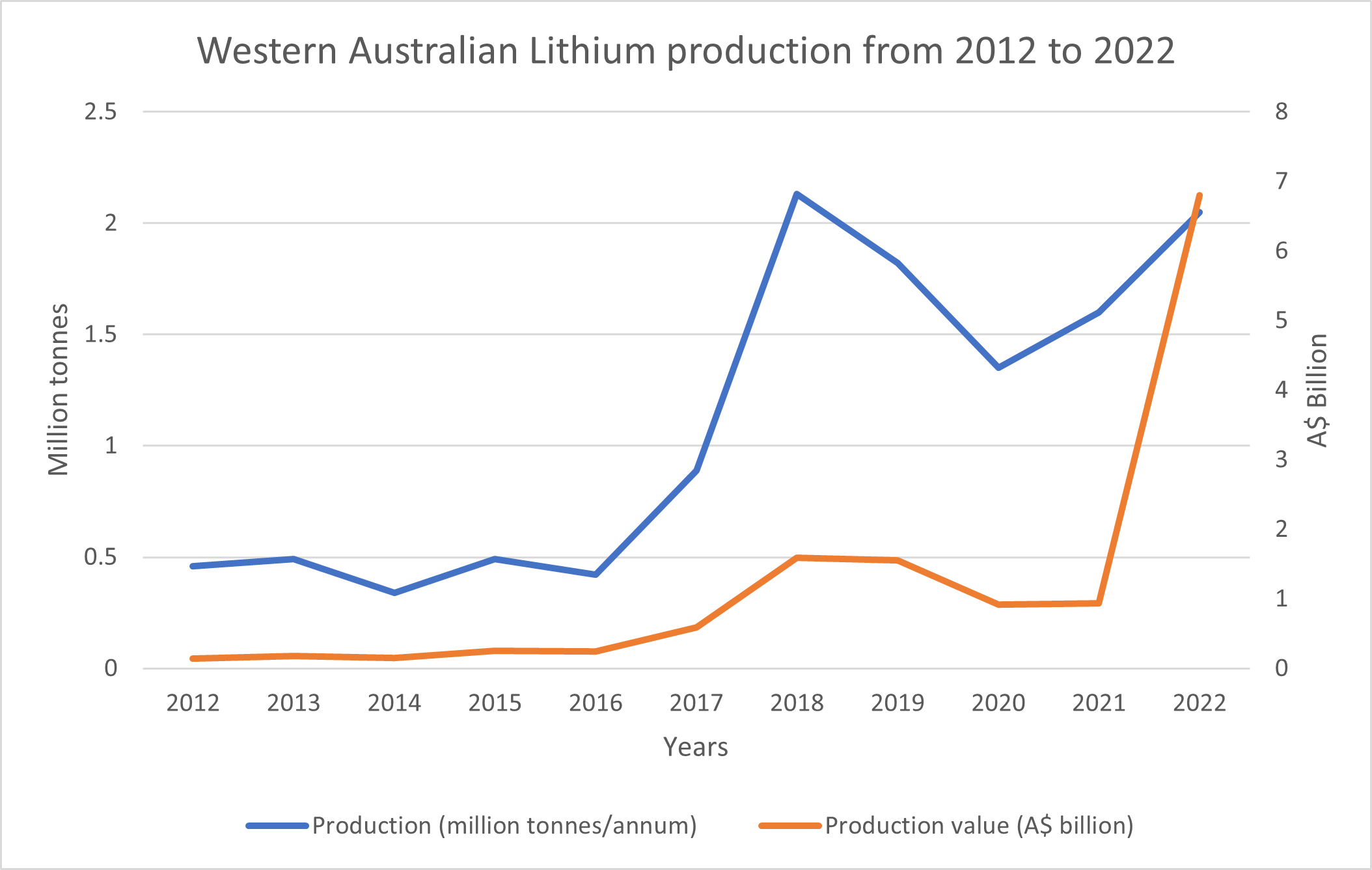
Western Australian Lithium production and value from 2012 to 2022

Historically, Lithium mining in Western Australia accounted for only a very small share of the state's mining revenues, to the point were the production would not be listed individually by the annual relevant mining department's publication but rather be grouped with tin and tantalum. In 2009–10, for example, the combined value of lithium, tin and tantalum production in the state stood at just under A$75 million in comparison to the state's mining industry value of A$71 billion at the time, with the state's lithium production coming from just one operation, the Greenbushes mine. Production values for the three minerals had doubled by 2015, and, in 2016–17, seven lithium mines were active in Western Australia, with a combined production of 2.1 million tonnes of spodumene concentrate at a value of A$1.6 billion.

Western Australia, during 2021–22, was the world's largest producer of Lithium, accounting for 52 percent of the world production. Global Lithium prices rose drastically, with spodumene concentrate reaching A$6,000 per tonne, six times its previous record, while battery-grade lithium hydroxide rose to US$70,000 per tonne. Spodumene concentrate production in the state increased to 2.05 million tonnes, resulting in a record value of A$6.8 billion.

Lithium mining in Western Australia, in 2021–22, took place at the Greenbushes mine (Talison Lithium Australia), Pilgangoora (Pilbara Minerals), Mount Marion and Wodgina (both Mineral Resources), the Bald Hill mine (Lithco No.2) and at the Mt Cattlin mine (Allkem).

=== Alumina ===
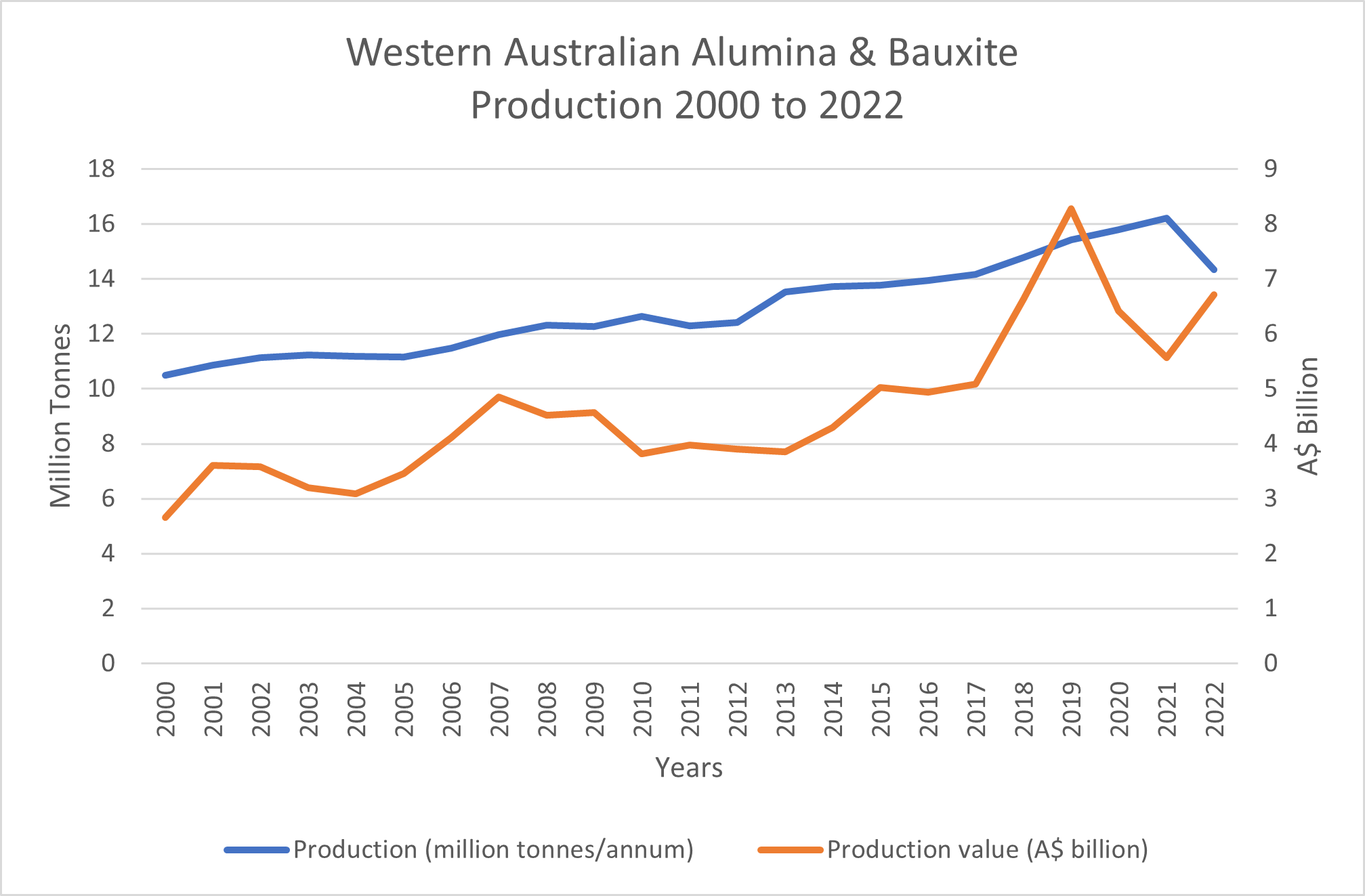
Western Australian Alumina & Bauxite production and value from 2000 to 2022

Western Australia accounts for 67 per cent of Australia's alumina production. The Darling Range in the state's southwest contains considerable deposits of bauxite, which are mined by Alcoa and Worsley Alumina for the production of alumina.

Alcoa's first bauxite mine at Jarrahdale was opened in 1963 to service the Kwinana alumina refinery. 168 million tonnes (370 billion pounds) of bauxite was mined from Jarrahdale until its closure in 1998. The Huntly mine was established in the early 1970s to supply bauxite for both the Kwinana and Pinjarra refineries. Willowdale mine was established in 1984, near Waroona. It supplies bauxite ore to the Wagerup Alumina Refinery.

Worsley Alumina constructed a bauxite mine site and refinery in the early 1980s, with the mine located near Boddington. The bauxite is transported by a 51-kilometre (32 mi) conveyor belt to the refinery at Worsley. Following an A$1 billion expansion in 2000, Worsley now export 4.4 million tonnes (9.7 billion pounds) of alumina.

Production of alumina and bauxite was a record 15.4 million tonnes (34 billion pounds) in 2018–19. The value of the alumina and bauxite sector increased 25 per cent from $6.6 billion in 2017–18 to $8.3 billion in 2018–19. The state's largest export markets for alumina are United Arab Emirates, Bahrain, South Africa and Mozambique.

In 2021–22, Western Australia produced 4.33 million tonnes of Alumina, ten percent of the world production and a decline from the 16.22 million produced in the previous period. Production value of the 4.33 million tonnes was A$6.7 billion, an increase because of the higher overall prices. Production in Western Australia occurred at the Alcoa World Alumina and Chemicals Huntly and Willowdale mines and at the South32 Boddington mine.

=== Nickel ===
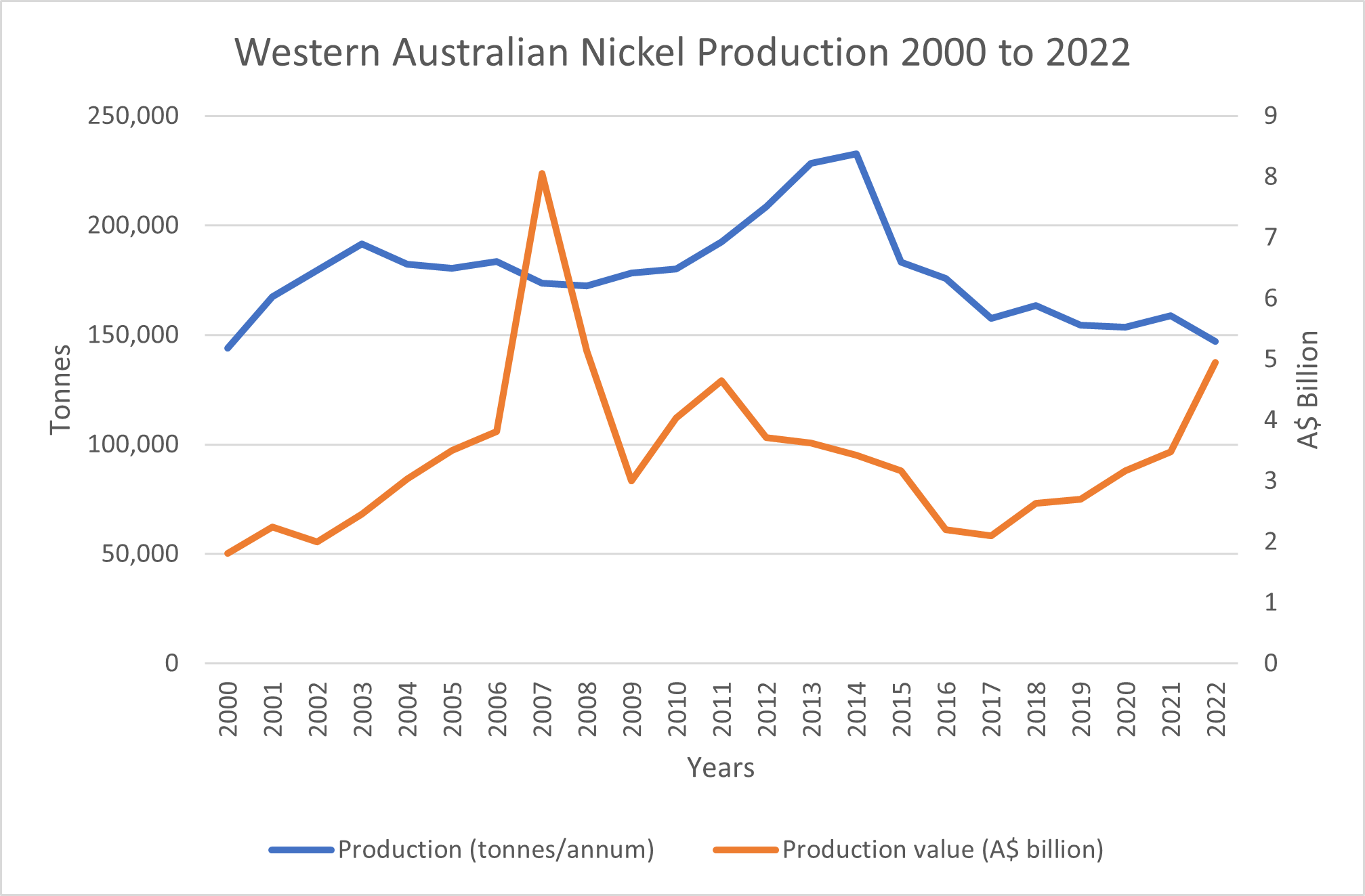
Western Australian Nickel production and value from 2000 to 2022

The discovery in Kambalda, Western Australia in 1966, Mount Windarra in 1969 and Agnew in 1971 coinciding with rising world nickel prices and a prolonged strike at a major nickel in Canada, meant that the discoveries were rapidly developed, bringing about a "nickel boom" between 1967 and 1971.

The Western Australian nickel industry suffered from falling international prices in 2009. Nickel production had been reasonably steady, the value of the industry had decreased from a peak A$6.9 billion in 2007 to under 3.3 billion in 2009. Also, the number of employees fell from a peak 13,307 in 2008 to 7,561 in 2009.

A large number of nickel mines in the state were placed in care and maintenance at the end of 2008 because of falling international prices.

Nickel mining is the sixth largest commodity sector in Western Australia with a value of A$4.946 billion in 2021–22. The 147,190 tonnes sold in that year accounted for 5.5 percent of the world's nickel production and 100 percent of all nickel produced in Australia. The 2021–22 value of nickel sales was the highest in 15 years, while the amount produced was the lowest in 20 years.

From 1997 to 2022, Western Australia was the only state or territory in Australia to produce nickel, until nickel concentrate production restarted at the Avebury nickel project in Tasmania in October 2022.

In 2021–22, nickel mining in Western Australia employed 8,294 people.

=== Base metals ===
The value of base metals production in the state declined by 12 percent in 2009. The largest base metals producing mine in Western Australia is the Golden Grove Mine near Yalgoo. The combined sales value of base metals mined in Western Australia in 2021–22 was A$2.3.

In 2021-22, base metals were mined at three locations in Western Australia, at Golden Grove (29Metals), at the Jaguar mine (Aeris Resources) and at the DeGrussa mine (Sandfire Resources).

==== Copper ====
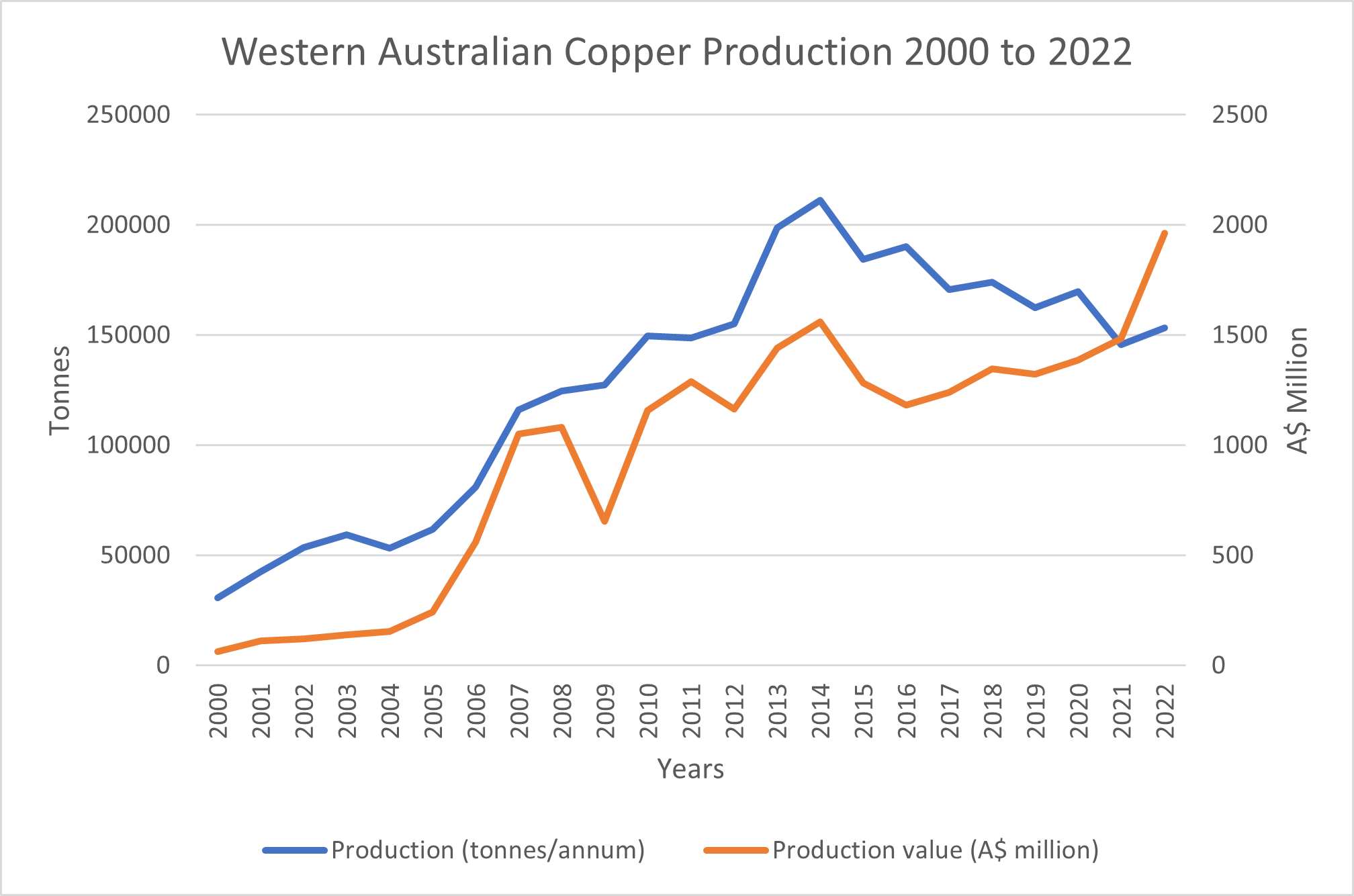
Western Australian Copper production and value from 2000 to 2022

Western Australian output of copper increased by ten percent in 2009, having grown from just over 34,000 tonnes (75 million pounds) per annum in 2000 to 142,490 tonnes (310 million pounds) by 2009, with a brief dip in production in 2004 due to the closure of the Lennard Shelf mine. In 2009 however, world copper prices fell by 26 percent, causing the industry in the state to lose 11 percent of its value. In 2021-22, Western Australian copper production reached a record value of almost A$2 billion. After decade-low production figures in the previous period, production of 153,000 tonnes of copper saw an increase again. Despite this, Western Australia remains a minor producer of the metal on the world stage. Over seventy percent of the state's production goes to South Korea (27 percent), the Philippines (24 percent) and Japan (22 percent).

In its first phase of operation, from 2004 to 2015, the Savannah Mine was the premier source of copper mining in Western Australia, providing up to 50 percent of the annual production in the state and being the largest producer of the commodity in Western Australia. The Savannah Mine restarted production in late 2021, with the main production of copper in the state coming from the Golden Grove mine, the DeGrussa mine and the Jaguar mine as well as, as a by-product, from Nova, a nickel mine, and the Boddington gold mine.

==== Lead ====
Lead mining in Western Australia experienced a boom in 2009, almost doubling its production. This was caused by the reopening of the Magellan mine, near Wiluna. Overall, the state's lead production in the last 20 years has been varied, reaching a peak of 91,380 tonnes (200 million pounds) in 2001, falling to 1,170 tonnes (2.6 million pounds) in 2004 because of the closure of the Lennard Shelf mine, before reaching another peak in 2006 and a low in 2008. In 2021-22, the Western Australian Department of Mines, Industry Regulation and Safety registered no production for lead in the state while, in the previous period, it had been 1,266 tonnes at a value of A$3.787 million.

==== Zinc ====
Zinc experienced a drop in production and prices in 2009, output in Western Australia falling by 33 percent and the value of the industry decreasing by 35 percent. Because of the close association in nature of zinc and lead ores, zinc has experienced the same variations in production as lead in recent decades. In 2021-22, Western Australia produced 74,049 tonnes of Zinc at a value of A$355 million, both increased figures compare to the previous period.

=== Mineral sands ===
In 2021–22, Mineral sands sales in Western Australia reached a record value of A$1.3 billion. Western Australia is the world's largest producer of Garnet and Zircon, having produced 374,476 tonnes of Garnet, 313,998 tonnes of Zircon, 66,596 tonnes of Rutile, 281,991 tonnes of Synthetic rutile, 230,358 tonnes of Ilmenite and 15,458 tonnes of Leucoxene.

=== Rare earths ===
Western Australia, in 2021–22, was the fourth largest producer of rare earths in the world, producing 30,000 tonnes, an increase compared to the previous period. Rare earths sales from the state achieved a value of A$779 million.Rare earths mining in Western Australia takes place at the Mount Weld mine, operated by Lynas.

=== Cobalt ===
In 2021–22, Western Australia produced 5,314 tonnes of cobalt with a value of A$522 million. While production remained steady in comparison to the previous year, the value almost doubled as market prices for the commodity rose from US$44,248 per tonne in 2021 to US$81,539 in April 2022. Cobalt in Western Australia is mined as a by-product in the state's nickel mines.

=== Salt ===
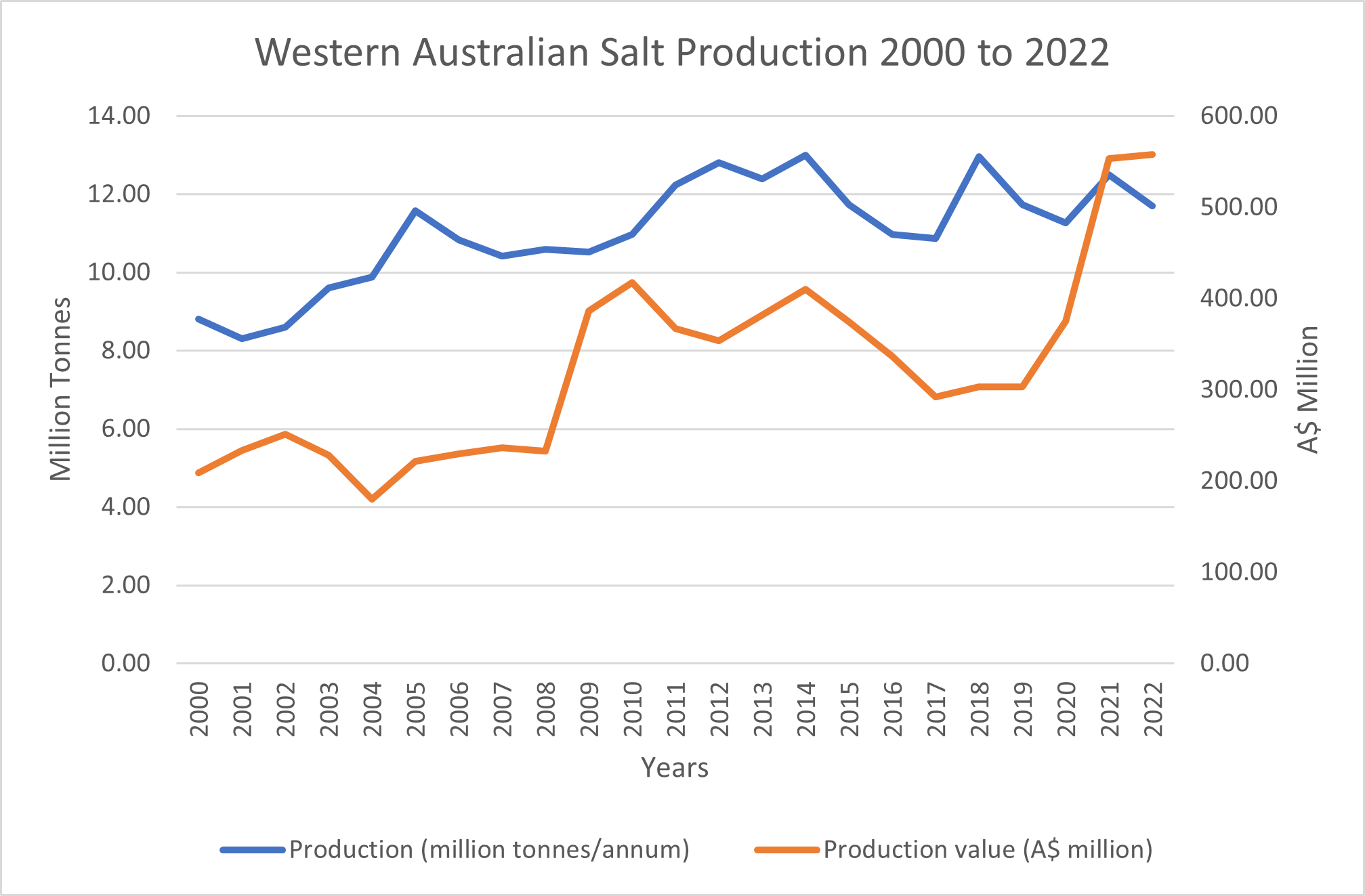
Western Australian Salt production and value from 2000 to 2022

In 20–2020 over 90% of all salt produced in Australia came from Western Australia. Of the state's production, 66 percent originated from Rio Tinto's operations at Dampier, Port Hedland and Lake MacLeod in the Pilbara. Other mining locations in the state include Mitsui & Co.'s Onslow and Useless Loop (Shark Bay) mines (33% of production), with minor production from Lake Deborah near Koolyanobbing.

While the overall salt production in Western Australia dropped by 4 percent in 2019–2020, to 11.2 million tonnes, the value of the industry increased by 24 percent, to A$375 million, due to increased prices. In 2021-22, Western Australia produced 11.6 million tonnes of Salt, a decrease compared to the previous period, at a value of A$558 million.

Salt mining in Western Australia is carried out at Dampier, Lake Macleod and Port Hedland by Dampier Salt, at Onslow by Onslow Salt, at Shark Bay by Shark Bay Salt and at Lake Deborah by WA Salt Koolyanobbing.

=== Coal ===
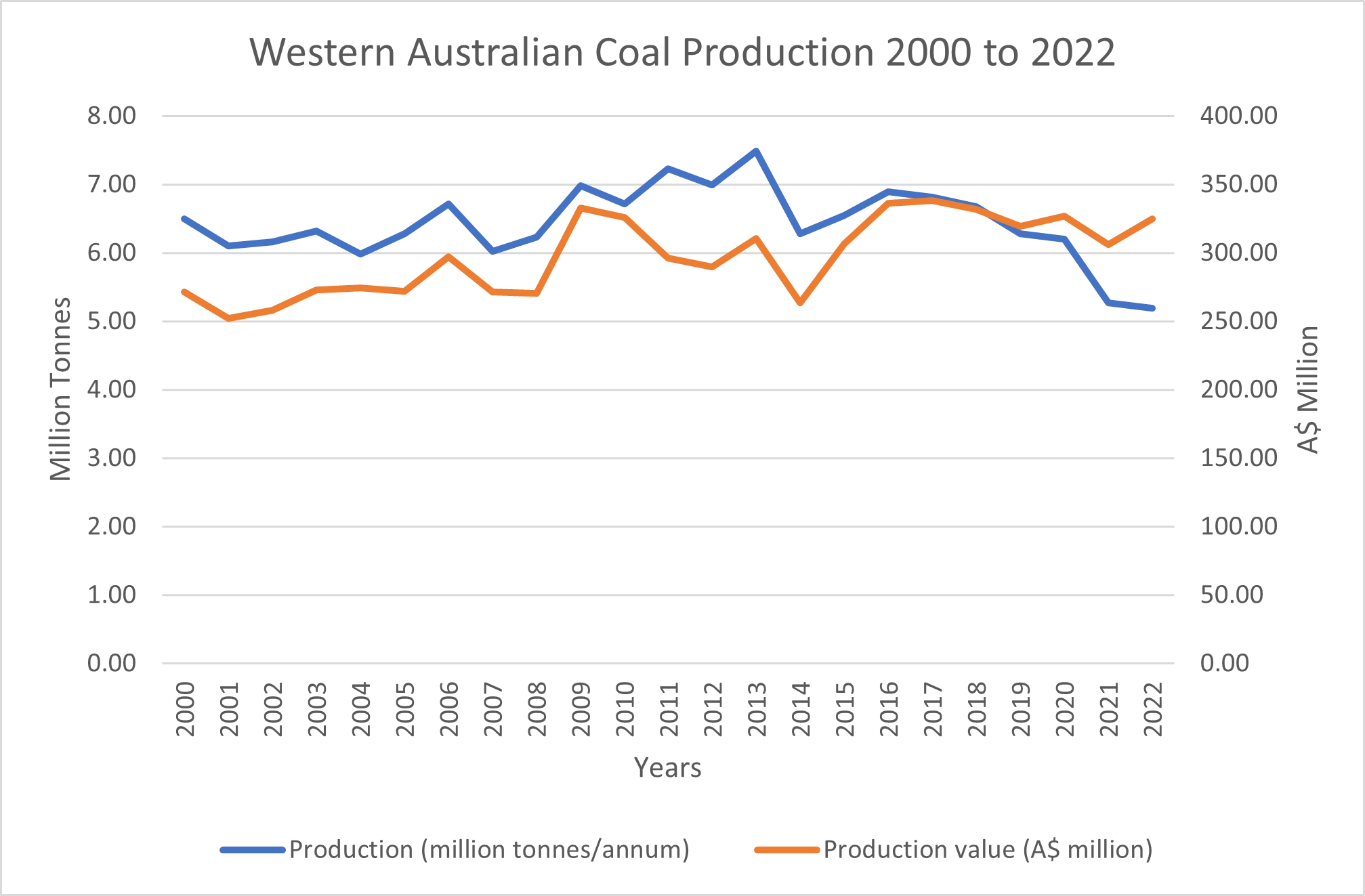
Western Australian Coal production and value from 2000 to 2022

Coal in Western Australia is currently, as of 2019, mined at Collie, where two mines are operating. Ninety percent of all coal mined at Collie is used in power stations, the remainder in the mineral sands production. While a small amount of Western Australian coal has been exported to India and China in recent years, the majority goes to the coal-fired power stations, mainly located in the Collie area.

Coal production in the state has been quite steady in the past decade, with the 2019 production of 6.3 million tonnes: only four percent less than in 2009. Like production, the value of the Western Australian coal industry has remained reasonably constant, too, with a slight increase in sales to A$319 million in 2019. In 2021-22, Western Australia produced 5.19 million tonnes of coal, a record low, at a value of A$325 million, seeing an increase despite the reduced production.Coal mining in Western Australia was carried out at the Premier mine (Yancoal) and the Griffin mine (Griffin Coal Mining Company), but the latter entered into receivership in September 2022.

=== Manganese ===
In 2021–22, Western Australia produced 539,000 tonnes of manganese, an increase from the 469,000 tonnes from the previous period, at a value of A$324 million. Sales values for the previous period are not available as it was achieved by a sole producer, the Woodie Woodie mine.

Manganese mining in Western Australia is carried out at the Woodie Woodie mine, operated by Consolidated Minerals, and the Butcherbird mine, a new mine opened in 2021 and operated by Element 25.

=== Diamonds ===
The bulk of diamonds produced in Western Australia originated from the Argyle diamond mine, located in the far north of the state. The mine produced around 20 percent of the global diamond output and commenced mining in 1985. The mine's most famous product was its pink diamonds, of which it produces around 90 percent of the world's supply, which is, however, only one percent of the mine's overall production. Apart from Argyle, there is only one other operating diamond mine in the state, the Ellendale mine, located 100 kilometres (62 mi) east of Derby, which opened in 2002. Ellendale produces the rare yellow diamonds.

In 2009, sale volumes for diamonds fell by 44 percent while the value of the industry in the state decreased by 53 percent in comparison to 2008.By 2022, diamond mining in Western Australia had ceased after the closure of the Argyle diamond mine.

=== Uranium ===
No uranium mining currently takes place in the state. Five projects are in the approval process but none of these projects are progressing to production in the short term given the low uranium price.

These five projects are as follows, with Lake Maitland, Lake Way and Yeelirrie located within 100 kilometres (62 mi) of Wiluna.

1. The Lake Maitland uranium project,
2. Toro Energy's Lake Way uranium project,
3. Cameco's Yeelirrie uranium project,
4. Cameco's Kintyre uranium project, and
5. Vimy Resources' Mulga Rocks uranium project.

Although no uranium mining is currently taking place, Western Australia is proposed for permanent disposal of nuclear waste from around the world.

== Controversies ==
=== Safety ===
In the past decade, from 2001 to 2010, 42 employees have lost their lives in the state's mining industry. Of those, gold and iron ore have been the most dangerous, with 14 fatalities each, followed by nickel, with nine. Of the 42 fatalities, 29 have occurred at the surface and 13 in underground mining.

From 1943, the year the Department of Mines records started, to 2010, there have been 657 work-related fatalities in the mining industry in the state.

=== Destruction of Juukan Gorge ===
The destruction of Juukan Gorge, consisting of two rock shelters dated over 46,000-years old, by Rio Tinto on 25 May 2020, prompted a national and international outcry and prompted a Parliamentary inquiry.

=== Environment ===
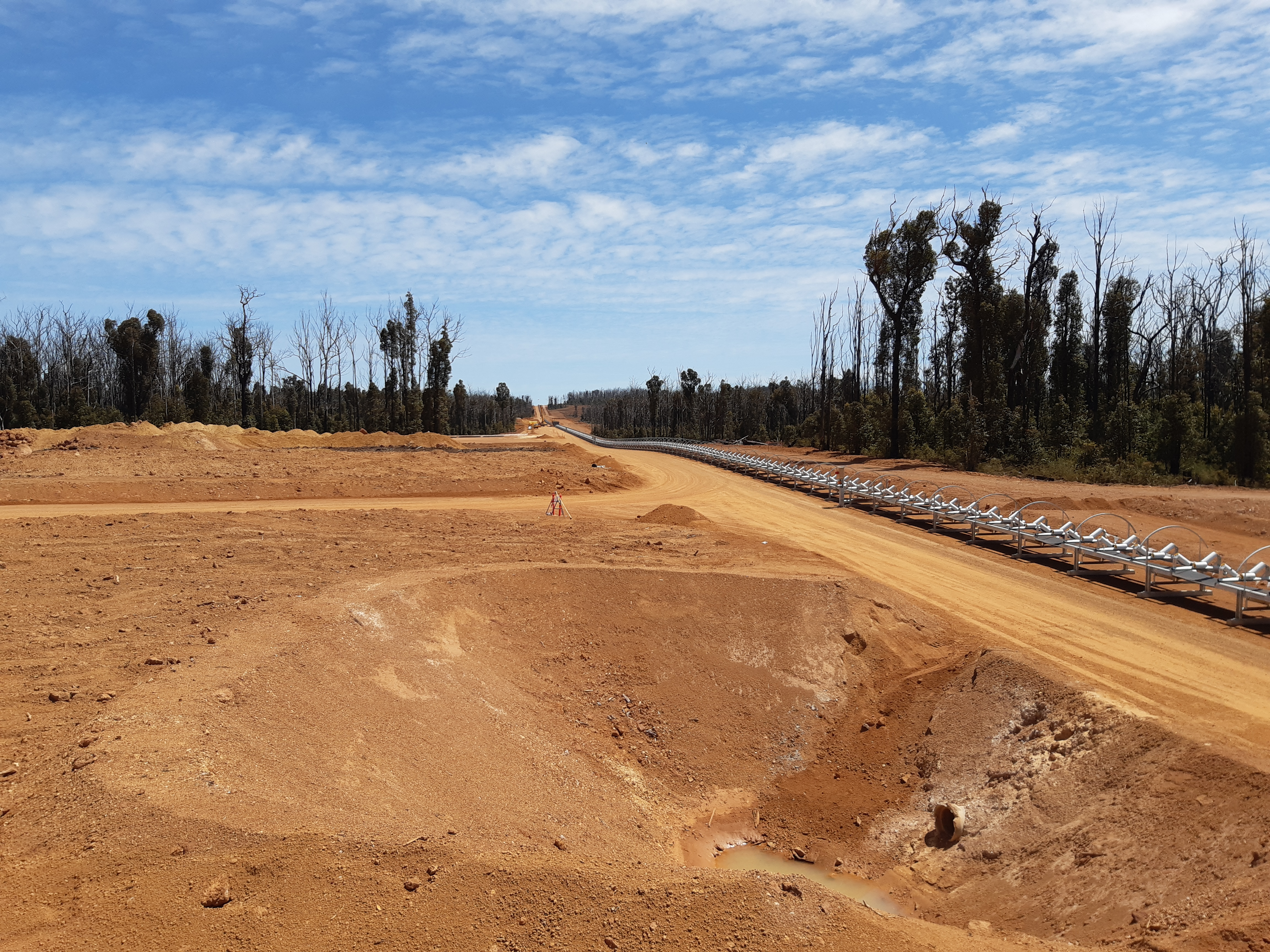
Construction of an overland conveyor in the Darling Scarp east of Wagerup, Western Australia

The majority of Western Australian mining operations are located in remote, thinly populated parts of the state. It was highlighted by the Office of the Auditor General that, despite the growth of the mining sector in Western Australia, inspections by the relevant government departments, the Department of Mines, Industry Regulation and Safety and the Department of Water and Environmental Regulation, had actually fallen in number in 2022. Those inspections that did take place focused on the Goldfields and southern regions, with none conducted in the north of the state in the 2021–22 financial year.

Because of its close proximity to the state's capital Perth, 55km south-west of the city centre, the effects of bauxite mining on the environment and Perth's drinking water have raised concerns. Bauxite mining takes place as close as 300 metres to Serpentine Dam, one of the city's drinking water supplies. In the five years prior to 2023, 227 drainage failures across Alcoa's Western Australian mines were recorded, with sediment flowing into Serpentine Dam 46 times during 2021. Also in 2021, 100,000 litres of diesel and hydraulic oil spillage from heavy mining equipment were recorded.

It has also been highlighted that bauxite mining, in the 2010s, has led to more land clearing than logging carried out by the timber industry, with mining accounting for 62 percent of the deforestation of tall and medium forests in Western Australia during that time. While native forest logging is to be banned from 2024, no such restrictions have been placed on bauxite mining. Bauxite mining takes place in the Northern Jarrah Forest, an ecosystem already under threat because of reduced rainfalls and temperature increase. While rehabilitation of the previously mined land takes place, until 1988 by planting dieback-resistant eucalypts from Eastern Australia, now by planting jarrah and marri trees, native forests take up to 200 years to fully recover as a habitat for native bird life.

== Statistics ==
Annual statistics for the Western Australian mining industry. Figures are for financial years, which, in Australia, run from 1 July to 30 June:

=== Production ===
Commodities measured in million tonnes per annum
Commodity	2000	2001	2002	2003	2004	2005	2006	2007	2008	2009
Iron ore	151.2	161.8	164.6	188.2	202.0	233.2	242.6	257.6	291.0	316.5
Alumina	10.48	10.86	11.13	11.23	11.17	11.16	11.47	11.98	12.31	12.27
Salt	8.81	8.30	8.60	9.61	9.88	11.58	10.83	10.42	10.59	10.52
Coal	6.50	6.10	6.16	6.32	5.98	6.28	6.71	6.02	6.23	6.98
Commodity	2010	2011	2012	2013	2014	2015	2016	2017	2018	2019
Iron ore	385.0	397.6	454.4	512.6	623.5	718.8	748.1	793.0	839.4	790.6
Alumina	12.64	12.28	12.42	13.53	13.72	13.77	13.94	14.17	14.79	15.43
Salt	10.97	12.23	12.81	12.39	12.99	11.73	10.98	10.87	12.96	11.73
Coal	6.71	7.23	6.99	7.49	6.28	6.55	6.89	6.81	6.68	6.28
Lithium	0.25	0.35	0.46	0.49	0.34	0.49	0.42	0.89	2.13	1.82
Commodity	2020	2021	2022	2023						
Iron ore	836.8	838.7	844.4	861.3						
Alumina	15.80	16.21	14.33	13.13						
Salt	11.27	12.5	11.7	13.1						
Coal	6.2	5.27	5.19	4.77						
Lithium	1.35	1.6	2.05	3.19						

Commodities measured in tonnes per annum
Commodity	2000	2001	2002	2003	2004	2005	2006	2007	2008	2009
Nickel	143,930	167,450	179,460	191,680	182,210	180,420	183,560	173,660	172,360	178,390
Copper	30,730	42,620	53,500	59,410	53,290	61,930	81,200	115,980	124,530	127,330
Zinc	232,590	236,010	223,670	206,450	108,040	48,400	110,520	142,180	197,130	142,060
Lead	64,470	82,330	75,080	70,020	29,450	2,320	58,740	70,470	25,710	25,200
Cobalt	2,070	4,190	4,430	5,920	4,550	4,500	5,200	4,700	5,090	4,710
Commodity	2010	2011	2012	2013	2014	2015	2016	2017	2018	2019
Nickel	180,150	192,450	208,540	228,300	232,673	183,320	175,752	157,564	163,374	154,383
Copper	149,810	148,760	155,080	198,610	211,186	184,495	190,275	170,730	174,074	162,483
Zinc	87,560	70,540	63,500	55,760	54,060	77,831	82,676	82,943	93,373	71,405
Lead	26,090	40,720	6,550	22,590	78,651	59,248	5,988	3,507	7,397	4,852
Cobalt	4,360	3,730	4,890	6,380	6,236	6,036	5,479	4,759	5,200	5,228
Commodity	2020	2021	2022	2023						
Nickel	153,516	158,710	147,190	160,371						
Copper	169,888	145,853	153,321	119,128						
Zinc	72,263	64,219	74,049	62,223						
Lead	2,905	851	0	12,776						
Cobalt	5,805	5,446	5,314	5,863						

Commodities measured in million carats per annum
Commodity	2000	2001	2002	2003	2004	2005	2006	2007	2008	2009
Diamonds	50.98	25.42	25.69	38.89	32.50	22.80	29.26	18.22	27.97	9.19
Commodity	2010	2011	2012	2013	2014	2015	2016	2017	2018	2019
Diamonds	16.28	10.12	8.69	9.61	11.61	10.39	13.87	12.61	15.28	11.15
Commodity	2020	2021	2022	2023						
Diamonds	17.49	8.08	0.04	0						

Commodities measured in kilograms per annum
Commodity	2000	2001	2002	2003	2004	2005	2006	2007	2008	2009
Gold	204,960	201,210	185,000	187,240	177,010	167,350	166,170	161,770	141,480	136,610
Commodity	2010	2011	2012	2013	2014	2015	2016	2017	2018	2019
Gold	163,830	183,800	180,390	178,680	196,074	193,162	195,968	203,003	212,060	211,534
Commodity	2020	2021	2022	2023						
Gold	212,142	207,567	213,757	212,465						

=== Value ===
Commodities with annual production values in A$ billions
Commodity	2000	2001	2002	2003	2004	2005	2006	2007	2008	2009
Iron ore	3.72	4.91	5.21	5.19	5.33	8.30	12.7	15.7	22.0	33.6
Gold	2.95	3.25	3.28	3.44	3.11	3.02	3.71	4.22	4.14	5.23
Alumina	2.658	3.601	3.584	3.205	3.085	3.462	4.111	4.847	4.522	4.564
Nickel	1.806	2.239	2.002	2.458	3.031	3.503	3.815	8.059	5.142	2.997
Commodity	2010	2011	2012	2013	2014	2015	2016	2017	2018	2019
Iron ore	35.3	57.6	60.8	56.4	75.2	54.4	48.8	64.3	62.1	81.8
Gold	6.55	8.19	9.40	8.97	8.89	9.11	10.11	10.86	11.42	11.96
Alumina	3.810	3.977	3.907	3.856	4.295	5.023	4.939	5.089	6.644	8.279
Nickel	4.649	3.712	3.625	3.419	3.17	2.203	2.095	2.636	2.700	3.168
Lithium	0.07	0.10	0.14	0.18	0.15	0.25	0.24	0.59	1.59	1.55
Commodity	2020	2021	2022	2023						
Iron ore	104.6	154.7	137.1	125.1						
Gold	15.87	16.57	17.37	18.59						
Alumina	6.417	5.565	6.709	6.682						
Nickel	3.480	4.946	4.041	5.743						
Lithium	0.92	0.94	6.8	20.9						

Commodities with annual production values in A$ millions
Commodity	2000	2001	2002	2003	2004	2005	2006	2007	2008	2009
Copper	64.62	111.12	122.57	138.57	155.82	243.73	559.85	1,052.5	1,080.6	654.34
Mineral sands	862.93	909.22	855.87	760.75	755.10	800.89	865.97	788.06	692.48	728.87
Salt	208.58	233.08	251.04	227.95	179.85	221.25	229.85	236.15	232.93	386.25
Coal	271.53	252.28	258.13	272.89	274.28	271.72	297.37	271.52	270.42	332.57
Diamonds	703.67	614.45	489.34	770.94	519.72	467.80	693.80	435.30	610.67	261.50
Zinc	251.01	280.24	173.82	173.19	79.55	42.42	336.65	675.75	578.31	231.27
Cobalt	82.26	174.38	127.36	124.18	213.14	202.38	183.98	275.28	448.53	220.20
Lead	20.24	37.31	36.72	30.97	10.57	0.31	86.55	146.07	81.39	42.12
Commodity	2010	2011	2012	2013	2014	2015	2016	2017	2018	2019
Copper	1,156.7	1,290.1	1,165.5	1,441.2	1,559.6	1,283.1	1,181.3	1,240.5	1,347.8	1,321.6
Mineral sands	695.87	473.33	898.27	755.90	471.03	470.63	571.55	583.45	550.39	715
Salt	417.46	366.94	353.78	381.66	410.10	374.62	336.25	292.29	302.93	303.29
Coal	325.86	296.26	289.63	310.64	263.70	306.73	336.47	338.44	331.96	319.37
Diamonds	304.33	303.0	343.29	349.50	398.21	342.31	354.05	268.38	249.76	219.22
Zinc	210.12	162.11	120.74	100.26	118.26	197.04	195.5	204.16	323.50	263.16
Cobalt	190.32	145.59	145.16	159.81	175.18	210.55	174.85	239.64	510.25	332.39
Lead	61.59	97.73	12.87	46.99	178.76	136.95	14.81	10.15	22.8	13.34
Commodity	2020	2021	2022	2023						
Copper	1,386.8	1,485.1	1,963.4							
Mineral sands	775.3	824.44	1,305.55	1,401.31						
Salt	375.12	553.48	557.53	714.15						
Coal	326.98	306.06	324.65	375.83						
Diamonds	281.27	112.1	1.19	0						
Zinc	223.32	229.19	355.38	265.19						
Cobalt	295.16	293.8	324.65	367.6						
Lead	7.47	2.17	0	39.77						

=== Employees ===
Employment figures for the major commodities and overall figures for the complete mining industry
Commodity	2000	2001	2002	2003	2004	2005	2006	2007	2008	2009
Iron ore	8,604	9,103	9,289	11,184	12,585	13,727	16,203	18,387	23,185	26,051
Gold	10,879	11,938	12,653	12,801	13,398	12,121	12,314	13,733	14,459	16,686
Alumina	6,706	6,569	6,633	7,015	7,613	9,711	8,967	8,559	8,201	8,212
Nickel	5,038	5,160	4,699	5,714	6,704	9,423	10,583	12,736	13,307	7,561
Mineral sands	2,243	2,338	2,170	2,224	2,435	2,789	2,914	2,840	2,670	1,934
Diamonds	940	1,009	1,101	1,094	1,397	1,479	1,614	1,863	2,218	1,602
Base metals	1,331	1,301	1,295	1,100	888	670	912	2,241	2,242	1,456
Salt	698	699	648	658	679	853	838	865	867	778
Coal	709	677	649	641	651	716	771	808	897	725
Overall	39,028	40,870	41,288	44,392	48,385	53,598	57,053	64,608	71,225	70,063
Commodity	2010	2011	2012	2013	2014	2015	2016	2017	2018	2019
Iron ore	33,345	43,008	55,323	60,844	58,257	58,093	53,229	53,221	53,716	59,525
Gold	16,997	18,859	22,439	20,541	17,337	19,587	23,556	27,075	29,266	31,369
Alumina	8,912	10,908	10,247	7,478	7,490	7,258	7,234	6,645	6,850	7,395
Nickel	7,266	9,168	8,798	7,664	6,447	6,096	5,645	5,900	5,474	6,062
Mineral sands	1,829	1,812	2,231	2,395	2,388	2,241	2,336	2,396	2,311	3,083
Diamonds	1,335	1,687	2,248	2,435	1,572	1,298	1,026	821	824	903
Base metals	1,926	2,317	2,907	2,882	2,649	2,531	2,358	2,239	2,535	2,626
Salt	985	1,295	1,010	1,137	1,071	958	869	845	978	1,039
Coal	969	985	676	418	638	958	1,128	1,098	1,153	1,139
Overall	79,245	92,564	96,876	101,698	108,975	105,922	101,650	106,652	112,036	124,010
Commodity	2020	2021	2022	2023						
Iron ore	65,454	76,150	78,974							
Gold	31,679	34,153	36,087							
Alumina	8,434	10,079	9,936							
Nickel	7,285	7,345	8,294							
Mineral sands	3,086	2,847	3,470							
Diamonds	665	320	50							
Base metals	2,636	2,319	2,471							
Salt	965	878	988							
Coal	1,280	1,002	900							
Overall	132,151	144,058	156,504	^{[1]}						

== Notes ==
- ^[1] Full time employees only. Up until 2022, the Western Australian Mineral and Petroleum Statistics Digest listed a combined figure of both full time employees and on-site personnel but the latter was not included in the 2022–23 edition, which only listed full time employees.
