= Department of State Security =

Department of State Security may refer to:

- Department of State Security (Nigeria)
- Department of State Security (Romania)
- Department of State Security (South Africa)
- Directorate for State Security (Yugoslavia)

== See also ==
- Department of State (disambiguation)
- Department of State Development (disambiguation)
