= Department of State (disambiguation) =

Department of State commonly refers to the United States Department of State. Other uses include:

== United States ==
- Michigan Department of State
- New Hampshire Department of State
- New York State Department of State
- Pennsylvania Department of State
- Puerto Rico Department of State

== Elsewhere ==
- Department of state (Ireland)
- Department of State Affairs, a translation of Shangshu Sheng, an executive institution of imperial China (ca. 206 BC – 1368 AD)

== See also ==
- Department of State Development (disambiguation)
- Department of State Security (disambiguation)
- Secretary of state (U.S. state government)
