= Mineral fields of Western Australia =

Mining administrative areas in Western Australia

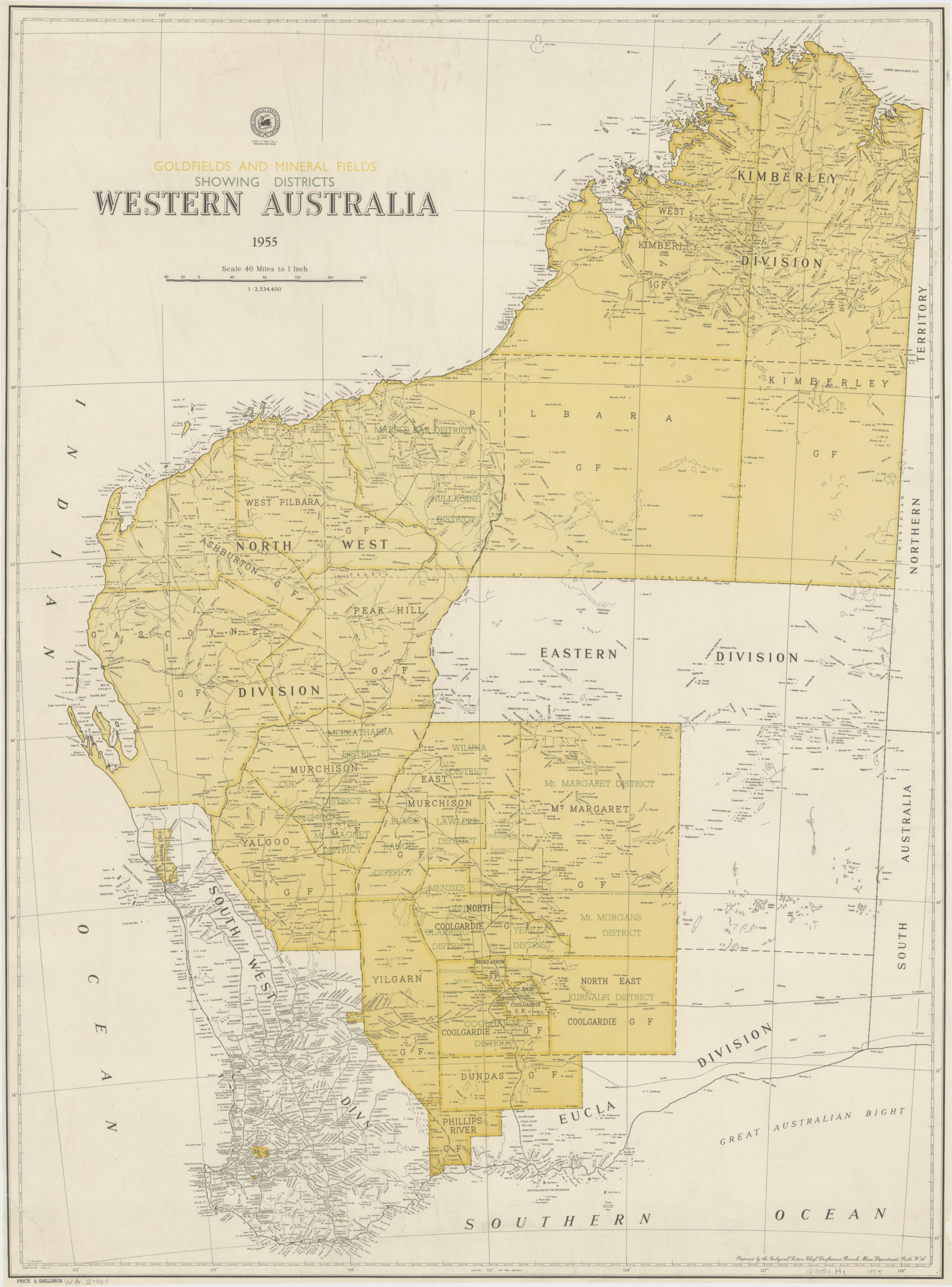
Gold and mineral fields of Western Australia, 1955

Mining in Western Australia is administered in terms of the administrative divisions of the:-

- Gold or Mineral Field
- Goldfield District

There have also been various hierarchies of State Mining Engineer Inspectorate areas, as well as Mining Registrars Offices and areas.

== List of fields ==
The following list is of the current Gold (G.F.) or Mineral (M.F.) Fields in the state The prefix code number is that which is found on maps of the Mineral Fields of the state. Areas are in square kilometres and Gazetted dates are from a 1981 publication. The three areas outside proclaimed Gold Fields are listed below the table: -

Prefix code number	Official Gold/Mineral Field	Current Goldfield District	Current mining registrar	Area in km^{2}	Gazetted date
01	Greenbushes M.F.		Perth	101	7 April 1892
04	West Kimberley G.F.		Karratha	225,373	19 March 1920
08	Ashburton G.F.		Karratha	69,930	25 December 1890
09	Gascoyne G.F.		Karratha	130,535	25 June 1897
12	Collie River M.F.		Perth	640	21 February 1896
15	Coolgardie G.F.	Coolgardie	Coolgardie	24,304	6 April 1894
16	Coolgardie G.F.	Kunanalling	Coolgardie	6004	
20	Murchison G.F.	Cue	Mount Magnet	22,256	24 September 1891
21	Murchison G.F.	Day Dawn	Mount Magnet	2,320	
24	Broad Arrow G.F.		Kalgoorlie	2,668	11 November 1896
25	East Coolgardie G.F.	Bulong	Kalgoorlie	2,564	21 September 1894
26	East Coolgardie G.F.		Kalgoorlie	2,098	
27	North East Coolgardie G.F.	Kanowna	Kalgoorlie	2,833	20 March 1896
28	North East Coolgardie G.F.	Kurnalpi	Kalgoorlie	50,531	
29	North Coolgardie G.F.	Menzies	Kalgoorlie	17,265	28 June 1895
30	North Coolgardie G.F.	Ullaring	Kalgoorlie	8,011	
31	North Coolgardie G.F.	Yerilla	Kalgoorlie	8,184	
36	East Murchison G.F.	Lawlers	Meekatharra	17,330	28 June 1895
37	Margaret G.F.	Mount Malcolm	Leonora	15,587	12 March 1897
38	Margaret G. F.	Mount Margaret	Leonora	103,322	
39	Margaret G.F.	Mount Morgans	Leonora	36,278	
40	North Coolgardie G.F.	Niagara	Leonora	1,782	28 June 1895
45	Pilbara G.F.	Marble Bar	Marble Bar	359,698	1 October 1888
46	Pilbara G.F.	Nullagine	Marble Bar	27,516	
47	West Pilbara G.F.		Karratha	75,711	20 September 1895
51	Murchison G.F.	Meekatharra	Meekatharra	31,727	24 September 1891
52	Peak Hill G.F.		Meekatharra	84,330	19 March 1897
53	East Murchison G.F.	Wiluna	Leonora	27,184	28 June 1895
57	East Murchison G.F.	Black Range	Mount Magnet	22,976	
58	Murchison G.F.	Mount Magnet	Mount Magnet	9,674	24 September 1891
59	Yalgoo G.F.		Mount Magnet	60,165	8 February 1895
63	Dundas G.F.		Norseman	29,604	10 January 1896
66	Northampton M.F.		Perth	3,377	1 January 1897
69	Warburton M.F.		Perth		15 May 1981
70	South West M.F.		Perth	229,561	14 April 1938
74	Phillips River G.F.		Perth	16,835	14 July 1899
77	Yilgarn G.F.		Southern Cross	44,807	1 October 1888
80	Kimberley G.F.		Karratha	224,834	20 May 1886

== Mining districts outside proclaimed Gold fields in 1981 ==
- Eucla 124,500 km^{2} gazetted 6 October 1967
- Nabberu 136,250 km^{2} gazetted 6 October 1967
- Warburton 260,483 km^{2} gazetted 6 October 1967 now number 69 above

== See also ==
- Eastern Goldfields
- Ghost towns of the Goldfields of Western Australia
- Goldfields–Esperance
- Hints to Prospectors and Owners of Treatment Plants
- Mining in Western Australia
- Regions of Western Australia
- State Batteries in Western Australia
- Western Australia Atlas of mineral deposits and petroleum fields
- Western Australian Goldfields
