= Insurance Commission of Western Australia =

The Insurance Commission of Western Australia (Insurance Commission) is a statutory corporation, or Government Trading Enterprise, owned by the State Government of Western Australia. The Insurance Commission reports to the treasurer of Western Australia, as its representative of the sole shareholder of the Insurance Commission.

The Insurance Commission is primarily responsible for:

- Administering, underwriting and managing Western Australia's Compulsory Third Party (CTP) insurance scheme for motor vehicle personal injuries;
- Managing RiskCover, the Government of Western Australia's self-insurance and risk management fund, on behalf of the State Government;
- Investing and managing moneys and other property under its control;
- Providing advice to the Government on matters relating to insurance and risk management.

== See also ==
- List of Western Australian government agencies
- State Government Insurance Office (Western Australia)
