= Western Australia Atlas of mineral deposits and petroleum fields =

Government mining publication for Western Australia

Western Australia atlas of mineral deposits and petroleum fields is a multiple-edition summary of mining and petroleum activity in Western Australia in the twenty-first century.

It was published in earlier forms by the earlier Department of Mines, later the Department of Industry and Resources, and most recently the Department of Mines and Petroleum, and the Geological Survey of Western Australia

The editions of the map, and the specifying the names of the mine and oilfield operators provide an indicative profile of the mineral and petroleum activity in a state that had significant investment fluctuations in the 2000s, and 2010s, with a large amount of investment and government budgetary estimations based on the perceived extended boom of the industries.

== Earlier forms ==
Prior to the Atlas series, there were dated maps without text or indexes.

- 1906 The 1906 map created by Maitland Brown was a major accomplishment to tie in the range of mineral fields and administrative issues regarding mining in the state, when technology had not conquered distances and logistic issues in updating information about discoveries or mines.
- 1983

== Post 1990 ==
Most of the post 1990 editions were considered a periodical (1990–2015) in some library systems.

Earlier editions were attributed to the Geological Survey of WA, however later editions include the main authors, compilers and editors:

- 1995

== Compilers identified ==
- 1999
- 2001
- 2005
- 2007
- 2013
- 2015

== Baseline geology ==
Each edition refers to the specified geological origins of the information (from the 2007 edition):

"Geology generated from Myers, J.S., and Hocking, R.M., 1998, Geological map of Western Australia, 1:250 000 (13th edition): Western Australia Geology Survey"—T.p. verso. Includes 2 maps of Western Australia (scale 1:10 000 000): Main tectonic units of Western Australia -- [Index map] to locate a project. Includes indexes.

== Online ==
Most of the reports are now available online as PDF files.
