= Department of Creative Industries, Tourism and Sport =

Western Australian government department

Department overview
- Formed: 1 July 2025
- Preceding Department: Department of Local Government, Sport & Cultural Industries
- Jurisdiction: Government of Western Australia
- Headquarters: 140 William Street, Perth
- Employees: unknown
- Department executive: Chad Anderson, Director General
- Website: www.cits.wa.gov.au

The Department of Creative Industries, Tourism and Sport (CITS) is a department of the Government of Western Australia. The department was formed on 1 July 2025 when the Department of Local Government, Sport & Cultural Industries was split as part of the Cook government's public sector reform.
