= ChemCentre =

Analytical chemistry facility in Western Australia

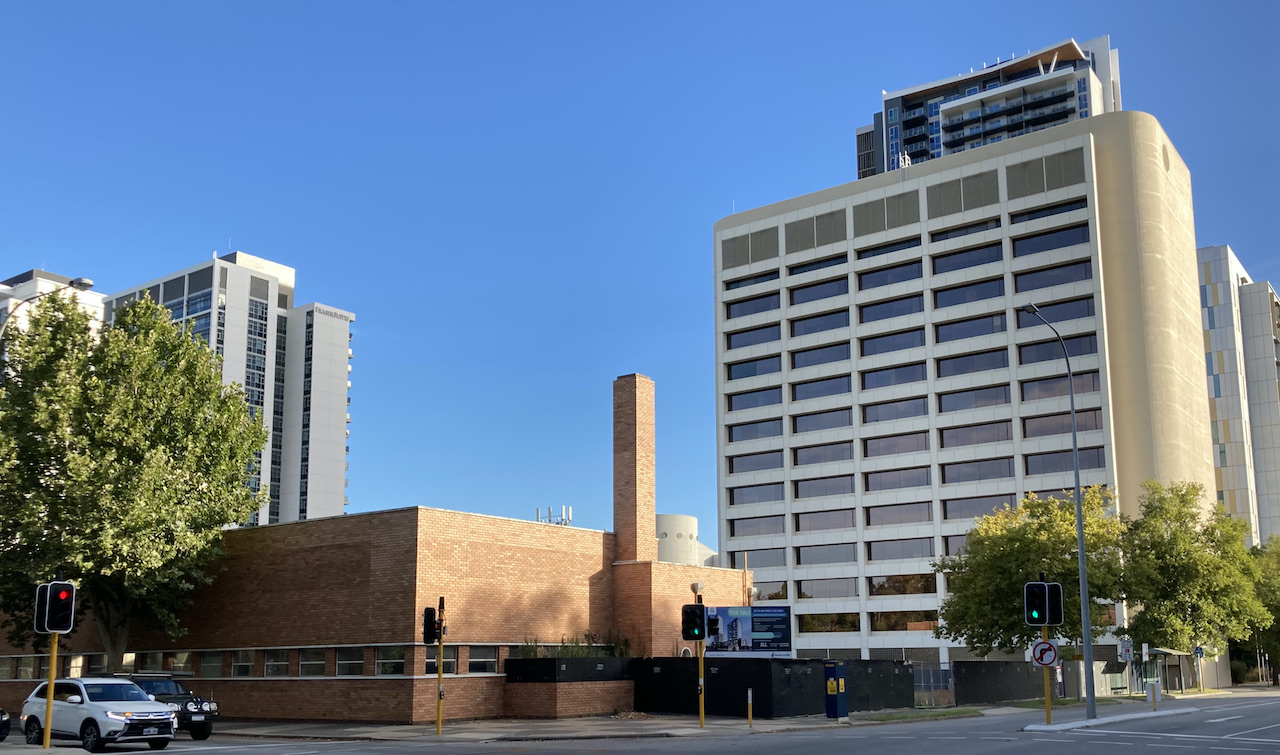
A picture of site of original ChemCentre in Perth

ChemCentre (formerly Chemistry Centre W.A.) is an analytical chemistry facility in Perth, Western Australia. It has an extensive history and delivers analytical, consultative and investigative chemical services to a range of government agency, industry and research clients.

Its role includes the provision of forensic scientific services to the Police Service and the State Coroner, scientific information and advice relating to agriculture, the environment, natural resources and health to government agencies, industry and research groups, and an emergency response facility for incidents such as chemical spills, terrorism, food safety or export incidents and health or environment concerns.

The Resources and Chemistry Precinct at Curtin University, Bentley campus.

The centre is the oldest NATA accredited facility in Australia and were established in the 1890s, originally formed to enforce the then recently declared Explosives Act.

The centre was situated for many years in the inner city suburb of East Perth, but in 2009 it moved into a new building in the Resources and Chemistry Precinct at Curtin University.

== Laboratories ==
- The Scientific Services Division has expertise in analytical chemistry, and supports the State's mining, agricultural, fisheries and food processing industries and assists in environmental protection, through air, water and soil analyses.
- The Forensic Science Laboratory supports law enforcement and the justice system in Western Australia through provision of forensic chemistry services to the Western Australian Police Service, the Office of the State Coroner and other agencies involved in the administration of justice.
