= Animal Resources Authority =

Western Australian government authority

Animal Resources Authority is a Western Australian government authority.

As an authority within the Western Australian Health Department portfolio, it governs and regulates the usage of animals in scientific laboratories.

At a national level, guidelines and codes exist in the same area and organizations that have animal welfare in focus.

== See also ==
- Animal welfare and rights in Australia
