= Department of Training and Workforce Development =

Western Australian government department

Department overview
- Formed: 2009
- Jurisdiction: Government of Western Australia
- Headquarters: Djookanup, 16 Parkland Road, Osborne Park
- Minister responsible: Minister for Training and Workforce Development
- Department executive: Jodie Wallace, Director General
- Website: www.dtwd.wa.gov.au

The Department of Training and Workforce Development is a department of the Government of Western Australia. The department is responsible for the growth of the Western Australian workforce through attraction and retention strategies, career development services and vocational and education training.

The department was one of the few that remained mostly unaffected by the 2017 restructuring of the Western Australian Government departments, which resulted in the number of departments being reduced from 41 to 25.

The department is led by Director General Jodie Wallace.
