= Geological Survey of South Australia =

Agency overview
- Formed: 1882
- Jurisdiction: Government of South Australia
- Website: www.energymining.sa.gov.au/minerals/geoscience/geological_survey

The Geological Survey of South Australia is an authority within the Department of Mining and Energy of the Government of South Australia that is responsible for surveying and exploration of South Australia's geological resources.

The Geological Office was started in December 1882 as under the Commissioner of Crown Lands and Immigration the creation of the survey had been an issue in the local press earlier in the same year.

Historically, the Survey has existed under the various names of the Mines Department has been ascribed by various governments.

The division makes its public geoscientific information available through the South Australia Resources Information Gateway (SARIG) and regularly publishes articles in its own MESA Journal.

== See also ==
- Geological Survey of Western Australia
- Geoscience Australia
