= Department of the Registrar Western Australian Industrial Relations Commission =

Western Australian government department

Department overview
- Formed: 1989
- Jurisdiction: Government of Western Australia
- Headquarters: Level 17, 111 St Georges Terrace, Perth
- Minister responsible: Bill Johnston, Minister for Mines and Petroleum
- Department executive: Susan Bastian, Registrar
- Website: www.wa.gov.au/organisation/department-of-the-registrar-western-australian-industrial-relations-commission

The Department of the Registrar Western Australian Industrial Relations Commission is a department of the Government of Western Australia.

The department is responsible for providing the Western Australian Industrial Relations Commission and the Industrial Magistrates Court of Western Australia with the infrastructure as well as the human, administrative and financial resources to perform their roles.

The origins of the department date back to 1900, when the Industrial Conciliation and Arbitration Act 1900 established the Registrar of Friendly Societies as part of the Crown Law Department, with Edgar Theodore Owen appointed as the first registrar. It remained under the Crown Law Department until 1964, when it was moved to the Department of Labour and Industry before becoming its own department as the Department of the Registrar in 1989. In 1995, it moved to its current location at St Georges Terrace in Perth.

== Registrars ==
The department and its predecessors were headed by a registrar:

Chairman	Term
Edgar Theodore Owen	1900–1909
Samuel Bennett	1909–1922
Francis Edward Walsh	1922–1939
Reginald Arthur Wood	1939–1949
Joseph Hamilton Bogue	1949–1960
Serventus Cyril Bruce	1960–1963
Raymond Bowyer	1963–1971
Roy Ellis	1971–1981
Keith Scapin	1981–1987
John Carrigg	1987–1997
John Spurling	1997–2011
Susan Bastian	2011–present
