= Western Australian Alcohol and Drug Authority =

Australian governmental agency dealing with alcohol and drug abuse

The Western Australian Alcohol and Drug Authority is a Western Australian authority that commenced operation on 1 January 1974.

The authority was established under the Western Australian Alcohol and Drug Authority Act 1974 for the treatment, management, care and rehabilitation of people suffering from alcohol and drug abuse in Western Australia.

The authority has undertaken research and provided educational facilities directed at alcohol and drug abuse. Various members of the authority have at times declared publicly their attitude towards evidence of alcohol abuse in Australia and the authority has had as part of its activity, concern about the criminalization of drunkenness. A range of people worked for the authority as social workers or other professional roles during their careers, including Kay Hallahan.

It has also provided materials assisting people requiring help.

The authority also manages rehabilitation centres.

== Publications ==
- Western Australia. Drug and Alcohol Office; Western Australian Network of Alcohol and Other Drug Agencies (2006), "Drugspeak: a partnership newsletter of the West Australian alcohol and other drug sector", Drugspeak: The Newsletter of the Wa Network of Alcohol and Other Drug Agencies, WANADA [and] Drug and Alcohol Office, ISSN 1833-5357
- Western Australian Alcohol and Drug Authority (1988), Directory of Alcohol and Other Drug Services in Western Australia, Alcohol and Drug Authority, ISSN 1032-3864
- Western Australian Alcohol and Drug Authority; Next Step Specialist Alcohol and Drug Services (1985), Annual report, The Authority
