= Department of Energy, Mines, Industry Regulation and Safety =

Western Australian government department

Department overview
- Formed: 1 July 2017
- Preceding agencies: Department of Mines & Petroleum; Department of Commerce
- Dissolved: 30 June 2025
- Superseding agencies: Department of Local Government, Commerce, Industry Regulation & Safety; Department of Mines, Petroleum & Exploration
- Jurisdiction: Government of Western Australia
- Headquarters: Mineral House, 100 Plain Street, East Perth
- Department executive: Richard Sellers, Director General
- Website: www.dmp.wa.gov.au/index.aspx

The Department of Energy, Mines, Industry Regulation and Safety is a department of the Government of Western Australia. The department was formed on 1 July 2017, out of the former Department of Mines & Petroleum and Department of Commerce.

A restructuring of the Western Australian government departments was part of Mark McGowan's 2021 Western Australian state election campaign and, in the month after taking office, the number of government departments was reduced from 41 to 25.

The department, through the Geological Survey of Western Australia, operates the Minedex website, which contains comprehensive information on mining and exploration sites and projects in Western Australia.

In May 2021, the department was one of eight Western Australian Government departments to receive a new Director General with Richard Sellers being appointed to the role effective from 31 May 2021 after his predecessor, David Smith, had retired.

It will be dissolved on 30 June 2025 with its functions split between the Department of Local Government, Commerce, Industry Regulation & Safety and Department of Mines, Petroleum & Exploration.
