= Department of Consumer and Employment Protection =

Government department of Western Australia

Agency overview
- Preceding agency: Ministry of Fair Trading
- Dissolved: 1 January 2009
- Superseding agency: Department of Commerce
- Jurisdiction: Government of Western Australia
- Employees: 921 (2006)
- Agency executive: Brian Bradley, Director General
- Website: www.docep.wa.gov.au

The Department of Consumer and Employment Protection was a department of the Government of Western Australia. As of 1 January 2009, it became the Department of Commerce.

== Preceding authorities ==
Legislation was not enacted in Western Australia until the 1970s. The names and dates of preceding authorities:

Ministry of Fair Trading (1993-01-01 - 2001-07-01)

Ministry of Consumer Affairs (1988-01-01 - 1993-01-01)
Bureau of Consumer Affairs (1975-01-01 - 1983-01-01)
Consumer Protection Bureau (1972-01-01 - 1975-01-01)
