= Department of Local Government, Sport and Cultural Industries =

Western Australian government department

Department overview
- Formed: 1 July 2017
- Preceding agencies: Department of Culture & the Arts; Department of Local Government and Communities; Department of Racing, Gaming and Liquor; Department of Sport and Recreation
- Dissolved: 30 June 2025
- Superseding Department: Department of Creative Industries, Tourism & Sport
- Jurisdiction: Government of Western Australia
- Headquarters: 140 William Street, Perth
- Employees: 498
- Department executive: Lanie Chopping, Director General
- Website: www.dlgsc.wa.gov.au

The Department of Local Government, Sport and Cultural Industries was a department of the Government of Western Australia. The department was formed on 1 July 2017, out of the former Department of Culture & the Arts, Department of Local Government & Communities, Department of Racing, Gaming & Liquor and the Department of Sport & Recreation.

A restructuring of the Western Australian government departments was part of Mark McGowan's 2021 Western Australian state election campaign and, in the month after his taking office, the number of government departments was reduced from 41 to 25.

The department is responsible for supporting the Western Australian economy through effective regulation and the facilitation of sporting and cultural experiences and opportunities.

In May 2021, the department was one of eight Western Australian Government departments to receive a new Director General, with Lanie Chopping being appointed to the role effective from 31 May 2021 after her predecessor, Duncan Ord, had retired.

On 1 July 2025, it was superseded by the Department of Creative Industries, Tourism & Sport.
