= Department of Commerce (Western Australia) =

Former government department of Western Australia

Agency overview
- Formed: 1 January 2009
- Preceding agency: Department of Consumer and Employment Protection
- Dissolved: 1 July 2017
- Superseding agency: Department of Mines, Industry Regulation and Safety
- Jurisdiction: Government of Western Australia
- Agency executive: David Smith, Director General
- Website: www.dmirs.wa.gov.au

The Department of Commerce was a department of the Government of Western Australia. It was formed on 1 January 2009 from the former Department of Consumer and Employment Protection and the Science and Innovation division of the former Department of Industry and Resources, with the functions of the Resources Safety division being transferred to the newly formed Department of Mines and Petroleum. It was superseded by the Department of Mines, Industry Regulation and Safety on 1 July 2017 when most of it was merged with the Department of Mines and Petroleum.

== Campaigns ==
=== Buy WA First ===
"Buy WA First" mark

Buy WA First is a campaign that was developed by the Department of Industry and Resources, The Western Australian State Government (subsequently by Department of State Development and Department of Commerce) to promote the sale of West Australian grown produce.

Commencing in May 2003, all retailers in the state were invited to join the campaign, with Woolworths, IGA and Coles supporting the initiative.
