= Geological Survey of Western Australia =

Western Australian government agency

Agency overview
- Formed: 1886
- Jurisdiction: Government of Western Australia
- Website: www.wa.gov.au/organisation/department-of-mines-petroleum-and-exploration/geological-survey-of-western-australia

The Geological Survey of Western Australia is an authority within the Department of Mines and Petroleum of the Government of Western Australia that is responsible for surveying and exploration of Western Australia's geological resources. The department provides information to industry, technical support and professional guidance to government on geology, mining and petroleum resources.

Historically the Survey has existed under the various names that the Mines Department has been ascribed by various governments.

== Mapping ==
The mapping by the survey between 1894 and 2015 is documented in Riganti and others with examples of state maps: -

=== Department of Mines: 1 January 1894 - 1 July 1992 ===
- 1894 - Woodward Map
- 1916 - Brockman Map
- 1919 and 1920
- 1933
- 1950
- 1966
- 1973
- 1979
- 1988 -- centenary of GSWA

=== 1992 - 2000 ===
- 1998
- 2015 Map

Also some sections have moved between the survey and other departments. For example, the hydrogeology section was moved to the Waters and Rivers Commission in 1996.

== Publications ==
- Annual Reports
- Western Australia Atlas of mineral deposits and petroleum fields

== See also ==
- Geological Survey of South Australia
