= Ghost towns of the Goldfields of Western Australia =

Abandoned towns of region of Western Australia

The Goldfields region of Western Australia has an extensive array of active and historical mining operations and towns.

Some of the towns listed here were developed and abandoned within a short space of time in the late nineteenth century and early twentieth century. Some mines and towns have been revived with the fate of the nickel and gold mining operations in the region. Other minerals have also seen mines and towns develop.

A number of the towns' names are also names of Goldfields and Goldfield districts in the mineral fields of Western Australia.

Considerable information about the locations has been compiled for the Golden Quest Discovery Trail. and the West Australian Gold Towns and Settlements volumes published by Hesperian Press, which includes localities in other regions.

== Towns ==
- Abbotts
- Agnew
- Austin
- Balagundi
- Balgarri
- Bardoc
- Beria
- Big Bell
- Black Flag
- Bonnie Vale
- Boogardie
- Boorabbin
- Boorara
- Boulder
- Broad Arrow
- Buldania
- Bullfinch
- Bulong
- Burbanks
- Burtville
- Callion
- Canegrass
- Colreavy (Knutsford)
- Comet Vale
- Coolgardie (The Old Camp)
- Cossack
- Cuddingwarra
- Cue
- Darlot (Woodarra)
- Davyhurst
- Day Dawn
- Desmond
- Duketon
- Dundas
- Dunnsville
- Erlistoun
- Eulaminna
- Euro
- Feysville
- Gabanintha
- Gindalbie
- Golden Ridge
- Goongarrie also known as 90 Mile and Roaring Gimlet
- Gordon
- Grants Patch
- Gullewa
- Gwalia
- Higginsville
- Horseshoe
- Jackson
- Kambalda
- Kanowna
- Kathleen
- Kintore
- Kookynie
- Kunanalling
- Kundana
- Kundip
- Kurnalpi
- Karrajong
- Kurrawang
- Lakeside (Lakewood)
- Larkinville
- Laverton
- Lawlers
- Lennonville
- Leonora
- Linden
- Mainland
- Malcolm
- Mallina
- Marvel Loch
- Menzies
- Mertondale
- Mount Ida
- Mount Morgans
- Mulgarrie
- Mulline
- Mulwarrie
- Murrin Murrin
- Niagara
- Noongal
- Norseman
- Ora Banda
- Paddington
- Peak Hill
- Siberia (also known as Waverley)
- Sir Samuel
- Smithfield
- Tampa
- Ularring
- Windanya
- Yarri
- Yerilla
- Yundamindera
- Yunndaga
