= Hampton Land District =

Coordinates: 30°50′S 121°40′E

Hampton Western Australia
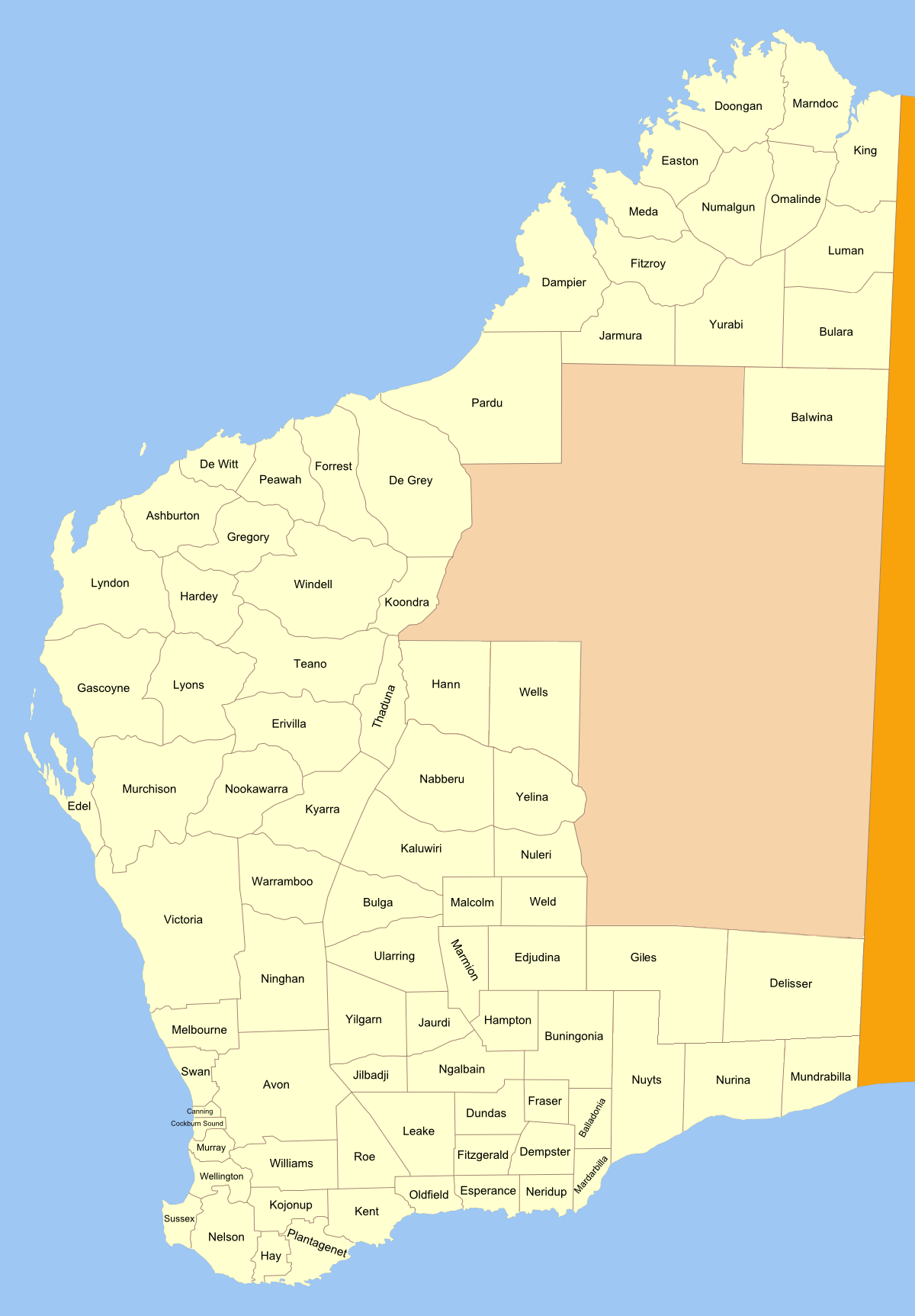
Lands administrative divisions around Hampton:
Marmion	Edjudina	Edjudina
Jaurdi	Hampton	Buningonia
Ngalbain	Ngalbain	Buningonia

Hampton Land District is a land district (cadastral division) of Western Australia, located within the Eastern Land Division in the Goldfields region of the state.

== Location and features ==
The district is located in the central Goldfields region, and contains the following towns or former towns:

- Kalgoorlie–Boulder:
  - Brown Hill †
  - Hannans
  - Ivanhoe †
  - Lakewood †
  - Parkeston
  - Somerville
  - Trafalgar †
- Balagundi †
- Bardoc †
- Black Flag †
- Boorara †
- Broad Arrow †
- Bulong †
- Feysville †
- Gindalbie †
- Golden Ridge †
- Gordon †
- Gudarra †
- Kanowna †
- Kurnalpi †
- Mulgarrie †
- Ora Banda
- Paddington †
- Windanya †

† — former or ghost town.

== History ==
The district was created on 4 October 1899, and was amended on 12 December 1900. It was described in the Government Gazette thus:

Bounded by lines starting from the South-West corner of East Location 48, and extending North along part of its West boundary to the South-East corner of Location 51; thence West and South and West and North along the South and West boundaries of Location 51 and the East boundary of Location 53 to the latter's North-East corner; thence 324° 46' 36 miles 14 chains 81 links, and North 30 miles 47 chains 46 links along surveyed lines to survey mark R 3, thence East to a point situate North from the North-East corner of Location 32; thence South, through the North-East and South-East corners of said Location 32, to a point situate East from the starting point, and thence West to the starting point, partly along the South boundary of aforesaid Location 48.
