= Goldfields–Esperance historical timeline =

List of events in region of Western Australia

This timeline is a selected list of events and locations of the development of the Goldfields–Esperance region of Western Australia.

Date	Event	Location	Notes
1627	Gulden Zeepaert, skippered by François Thijssen sails along the coast of the Great Australian Bight	Great Australian Bight	
1791	George Vancouver sails through the Recherche Archipelago and Esperance Bay aboard HMS Discovery	Recherche Archipelago	
1792	French sailors visit Recherche Archipelago and Esperance Bay aboard Recherche and Espérance captained by Bruni d'Entrecasteaux	Recherche Archipelago	
1801	Nicolas Baudin sails across the Great Australian Bight as part of his expedition to map the coast aboard Le Géographe and Le Naturaliste	Great Australian Bight	
1802	Matthew Flinders sails across the Great Australian Bight as part of his expedition to map the coast aboard Investigator	Great Australian Bight	
1820s	Whalers and sealers operating along the south eastern coastline of Western Australia.	Recherche Archipelago	
1824	Wreck of the sealer Belinda	Middle Island	
1841	Edward John Eyre and Wylie traverse Great Australian Bight and Nullarbor Plain by land as part of their expedition from South Australia to Albany	Nullarbor Plain	
1870	Fraser Range Station established by John and Alexander Forrest on their expedition to Adelaide	Fraser Range Station	
1872	Mundrabilla Station established	Mumndrabilla	
1876	Pastoralists start breeding horses in the area near present-day Madura Station	Madura Station	
1877	The East West Telegraph Line is completed and the first Eyre Telegraph Station is constructed	Nullarbor Plain	
1892	Gold is discovered and the townsite of Coolgardie is established.	Coolgardie	
1892	Gold is discovered near Gudarra	Gudarra	
1892	Gold is discovered near Lawlers by prospectors Anderson, Hall and Heffernan	Lawlers	
1893	A group of Prospectors travelling to Mount Youle; Patrick (Paddy) Hannan, Tom Flanagan, and Dan O'Shea discover gold.	Kalgoorlie	
1893	Gold is discovered by prospector, R.H Henning, near Black Flag	Black Flag	
1893	Gold is discovered prospectors, Hogan, Henry, Holmes, Kennedy and Turnbull near Bulong	Bulong	
1893	The townsite of Kalgoorlie is gazetted.	Kalgoorlie	
1893	The townsite of Esperance is gazetted	Esperance	
1894	Eastern Goldfields Railway completed between Northam and Southern Cross	Southern Cross	
1894	Gold is discovered near Bardoc	Bardoc	
1895	Gold is discovered near Callion	Callion	
1895	Gold is discovered near Kookynie by a group of prospectors including W.A. Miller	Kookynie	
1895	The townsite of Bulong gazetted.	Bulong	
1895	The townsite of Dundas gazetted.	Dundas	
1895	Sturt Meadows cattle station established by Henry Manuel	Sturt Meadows Station	
1895	The townsite of Goongarrie gazetted.	Goongarrie	
1895	The townsite of Menzies is gazetted	Menzies	
1896	Eastern Goldfields Railway completed between Southern Cross and Boorabbin	Boorabbin	
1896	The townsite of Bardoc is gazetted	Bardoc	
1896	The townsite of Broad Arrow is gazetted	Broad Arrow	
1896	The townsite of Lawlers is gazetted	Lawlers	
1896	Gold is discovered and mining commences near Mount Morgans	Mount Morgans Gold Mine	
1896	The townsite of Murrin Murrin is gazetted	Murrin Murrin	
1896	Pinnacles cattle station established by Messrs Routledge, Morris and Willis	Pinnacles Station	
1896	St John of God Sisters establish hospital in Coolgardie	Coolgardie	
1896	St Mary's Catholic Church, Kalgoorlie, opened	Kalgoorlie	
1897	The townsite of Black Flag is gazetted	Black Flag	
1897	The townsite of Gudarra is gazetted	Gudarra	
1897	The townsite of Kambalda gazetted.	Kambalda	
1897	The townsite of Leonora is gazetted	Leonora	
1897	The upgraded stone Eyre Telegraph Station is constructed	near Cocklebiddy	
1897	The townsite of Callion gazetted.	Callion	
1897	Eastern Goldfields Railway completed between Boorabbin and Kalgoorlie, completing the line all the way to Perth	Kalgoorlie	
1897	The townsite of Widgiemooltha gazetted.	Widgiemooltha	
1898	The townsite of Waverley gazetted.	Waverley	
1899	The townsite of Mount Morgans gazetted.	Mount Morgans	
1900	The townsite of Laverton gazetted	Laverton	
1900	The townsite of Kookynie gazetted.	Kookynie	
1901	Crusading editor of Kalgoorlie Sun, Hugh Mahon, elected first member for federal electorate of Coolgardie		
1903	Goldfields Water Supply Scheme commences operations and first water arrives at Mount Charlotte Reservoir	Kalgoorlie	
1903	The townsite of Yarri gazetted.	Yarri	
1903	Banjawarn Station established initially to graze sheep	Banjawarn Station	.
1904	The townsite of Princess Royal gazetted.	Princess Royal	
1904	Erlistoun cattle station established by Butcher and Uhr	Erlistoun	
1904	The townsite of Lakewood gazetted.	Lakewood	
1904	Yundamindera cattle station established by Dr Charles Laver	Yundamindera Station	
1904	The townsite of Yunndaga gazetted.	Yunndaga	
1906	Credo cattle station established by William Henry Halford	Credo Station	
1907	Gold Stealing Detective Squad formed in Kalgoorlie	Gold Stealing Detection Unit	
1908	The Coolgardie to Widgiemooltha section of the Esperance branch railway opened	Widgiemooltha	
1909	The Widgiemooltha to Norseman section of the Esperance branch railway opened	Norseman	
1910	The townsite of Kurrawang is gazetted	Kurrawang	
1912	The townsite of Ora Banda is gazetted	Ora Banda	
1912	Daisy Bates appointed Honorary Protector of Aborigines at Eucla	Eucla	
1916	The townsite of Comet Vale gazetted.	Comet Vale	
1917	Trans-Australian Railway completed	Nullarbor Plain	
1919	Prospector, Pat Ives, discovered gold at his working known as Ives Reward	St Ives Gold Mine	
1922	Albert Green begins 18-year term as federal member for Kalgoorlie		
1923	The townsite of Grass Patch gazetted.	Grass Patch	
1924	Adelong cattle station established	Adelong Station	
1924	The townsite of Scaddan gazetted.	Scaddan	
1925	The Esperance to Salmon Gums section of the Esperance branch railway opened	Salmon Gums	
1925	The townsite of Salmon Gums gazetted.	Salmon Gums	
1926	Walsh and Pitman - two detectives murdered by gold thieves	Gold Stealing Detection Unit	
1927	The East West Telegraph ceases operations	Nullarbor Plain	
1927	The Salmon Gums to Norseman section of the Esperance branch railway opened	Norseman	
1928	Construction of Kalgoorlie Aerodrome commences	Kalgoorlie	
1933	Warburton is established as an Aboriginal Mission	Warburton	
1934	The townsite of Mount Palmer gazetted after gold is found.	Mount Palmer	
1934	Construction of the Esperance Deepwater wharf, known as Tankers Jetty, commences.	Esperance	
1935	Construction of Tankers Jetty is completed.	Esperance	
1936	The townsite of Agnew is gazetted	Agnew	
1941	Construction of Eyre Highway commences		
1942	Construction of Eyre Highway completed		
1942	The Boulder bombings kill 15	Boulder	
1948	Katherine Susannah Prichard's novel Golden Miles portrays Goldfields life of the 1920s		
1952	Mount Morgans gold mine closes after producing 328,000 ounces of gold at 15 g/t.	Mount Morgans Gold Mine	
1952	Kurrawang Native Mission established	Kalgoorlie	
1953	Construction of Anne Beadell Highway commences		
1955	Construction of Gunbarrel Highway commences		
1956	Giles Weather Station established	Warakurna	
1958	Construction of Gunbarrel Highway completed	Carnegie Station	
1960	Fall of Millibillie meteorite	Wiluna	
1961	Arubiddy sheep station is established	Arubiddy Station	
1962	Construction of Anne Beadell Highway completed	Laverton	
1962	The townsite of Caiguna is established	Caiguna	
1962	Rawlinna sheep station, the largest sheep station in the world, is established by Hugh G. MacLachlan	Rawlinna Station	
1962	The townsite of Munglinup gazetted.	Munglinup	
1963	The townsite of Condingup gazetted.	Condingup	
1965	The townsite of Koolyanobbing gazetted.	Koolyanobbing	
1965	First land-backed berth opened at Esperance Port	Esperance	
1966	The townsite of Jerdacuttup gazetted.	Jerdacuttup	
1966	Malcolm Campbell Ross takes up the lease on Mount Elvire Station	Mount Elvire Station	
1967	Mining of Iron Ore commences at Dowd Hill	Koolyanobbing	
1969	A prospector named Ken Shirley discovered a huge nickel deposit at Mount Windarra in the Laverton area	Laverton	
1970	Indian Pacific transcontinental train begins operation, with change of locomotive at Kalgoorlie		
1971	Nullarbor Nymph hoax	Eucla	
1972	Second land-backed berth opened at Esperance Port	Esperance	
1976	The townsite of Leinster is established by Agnew Mining as a dormitory town for workers at its nickel mine	Leinster	
1980	Graeme Campbell begins 18-year term as federal member for Kalgoorlie		
1979	Granny Smith gold deposit discovered near Mount Weld	Granny Smith Gold Mine	
1988	Gold is discovered at Sunrise Dam	Sunrise Dam Gold Mine	
1988	Mount Morgans gold mine reopens after closing in 1952	Mount Morgans Gold Mine	
1989	Super pit created in Kalgoorlie from the consolidation of a number of small underground mines into a single open pit mine by Kalgoorlie Consolidated Gold Mines	Kalgoorlie	
1991	Bulk carrier Sanko Harvest sinks after striking reef	Recherche Archipelago	
1993	Ten mile Lagoon wind farm commences operations near Esperance	Ten Mile Lagoon Wind Farm	
1993	Gold mining commences at Tarmoola mine near Leonora	Tarmoola Gold Mine	
1993	Mining commences at Kanowna Belle near Kalgoorlie	Kanowna Belle Gold Mine	
1997	Mount Morgans gold mine closes again after reopening in 1988	Mount Morgans Gold Mine	
2002	Third land-backed berth opened and A$65 million upgrade at Esperance Port completed	Esperance	
2004	Mining ceases at Tarmoola following a pit wall collapse	Tarmoola Gold Mine	
2006	Mining commences at Wattle Dam gold mine	Wattle Dam Gold Mine	
2008	Death of Mr Ward from overheating in police van	Kalgoorlie	
2009	Mount Morgans gold mine reopens after closing in 1997	Mount Morgans Gold Mine	
2010	Buildings damaged in Kalgoorlie-Boulder earthquake	Kalgoorlie-Boulder	
2012	Mining commences at Tropicana gold mine	Tropicana Gold Mine	

== See also ==
- Kimberley historical timeline
- Pilbara historical timeline
- Regions of Western Australia
