= Electoral district of Kanowna =

Former electoral district of Western Australia

Kanowna Western Australia—Legislative Assembly
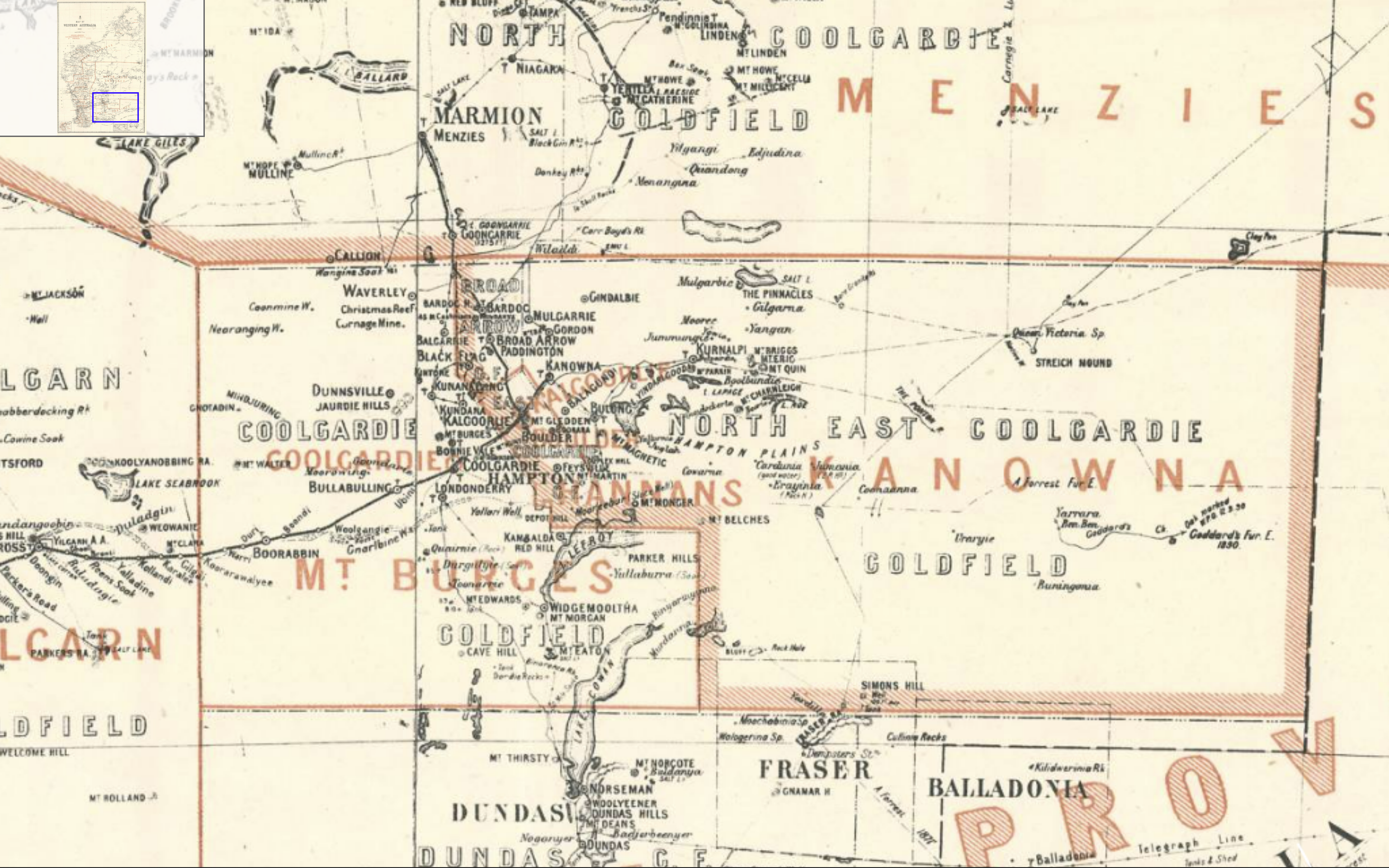
- Kanowna and surrounds, 1900
- State: Western Australia
- Dates current: 1901–1950
- Namesake: Kanowna

Kanowna was an electoral district of the Legislative Assembly in the Australian state of Western Australia from 1901 to 1950.

The district was located in the Goldfields region, and was based in the town of Kanowna. Upon its creation in 1900 it also included the towns of Bardoc, Windanya, Broad Arrow, Paddington, Black Flag, Mulgarrie, Gindalbie, Kurnalpi, and Bulong. It was held by the Labor Party at all times. When the district was abolished at the 1950 state election, sitting member Emil Nulsen transferred to the new seat of Eyre.

== Members ==
Members	Party	Term
Robert Hastie	Labour	1901–1905
Thomas Walker	Labor	1905–1932
Emil Nulsen	Labor	1932–1950
