= Electoral district of North-East Coolgardie =

Former electoral district in Western Australia

North-East Coolgardie Western Australia—Legislative Assembly
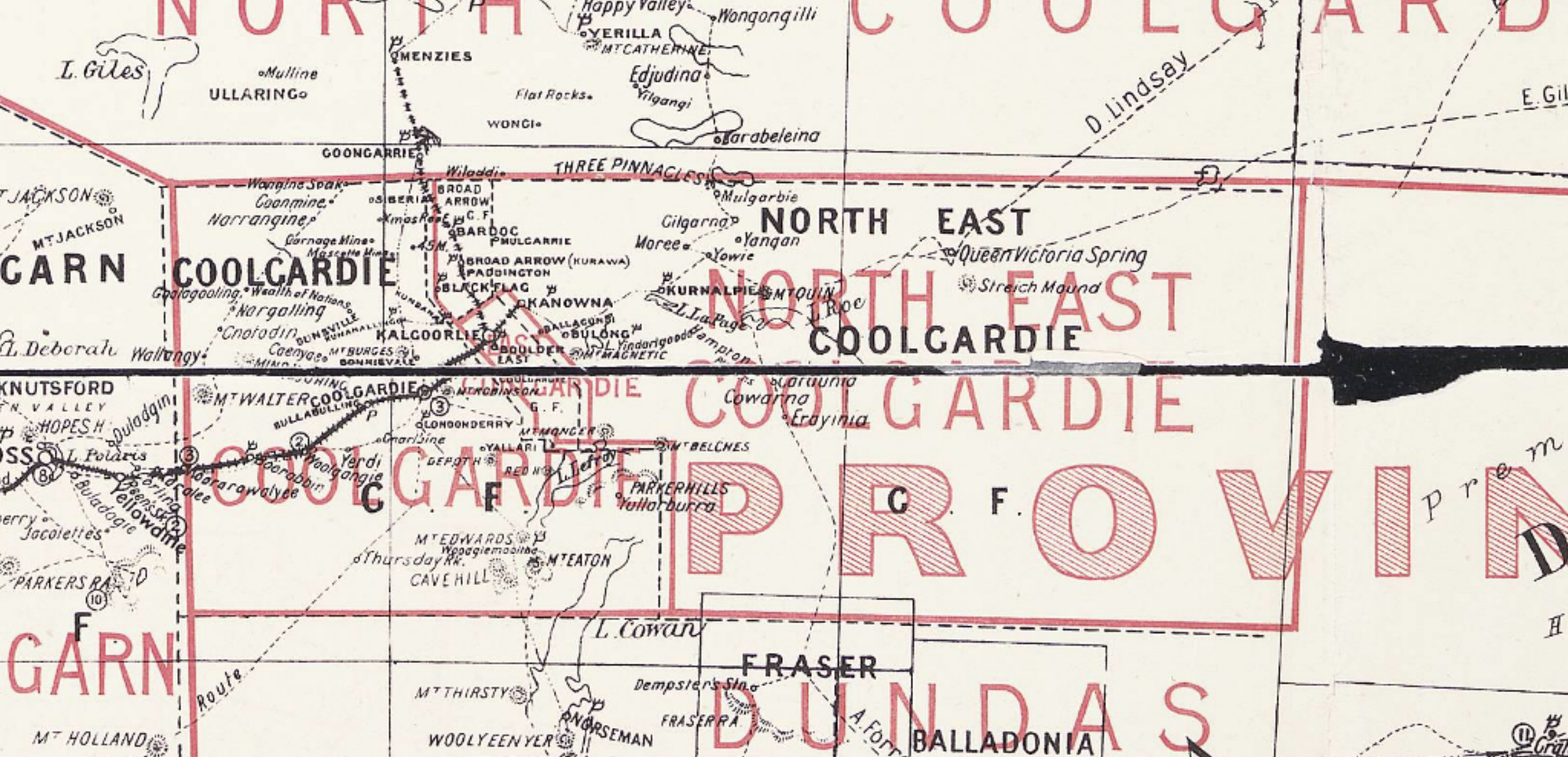
- North-East Coolgardie and surrounds in 1898
- State: Western Australia
- Dates current: 1897–1901
- Namesake: Coolgardie

North-East Coolgardie was an electoral district of the Legislative Assembly in the Australian state of Western Australia from 1897 to 1901.

The district was located in the Eastern Goldfields. Its only member was Frederick Vosper, who died towards the end of the parliamentary term. No by-election was held due to the imminence of the 1901 state election.

At 31 December 1898, the district bordered North Coolgardie to the north, Dundas to the west and south, and Coolgardie and East Coolgardie to the east. It included the settlements of Bulong, Kanowna, Broad Arrow, Black Flag, Paddington, Bardoc, Mulgarrie, and Kurnalpie.

== Members ==
Members	Party	Term
Frederick Vosper	Opposition	1897–1901
