= Localities on the Trans-Australian Railway =

List of localities on the Trans-Australian Railway

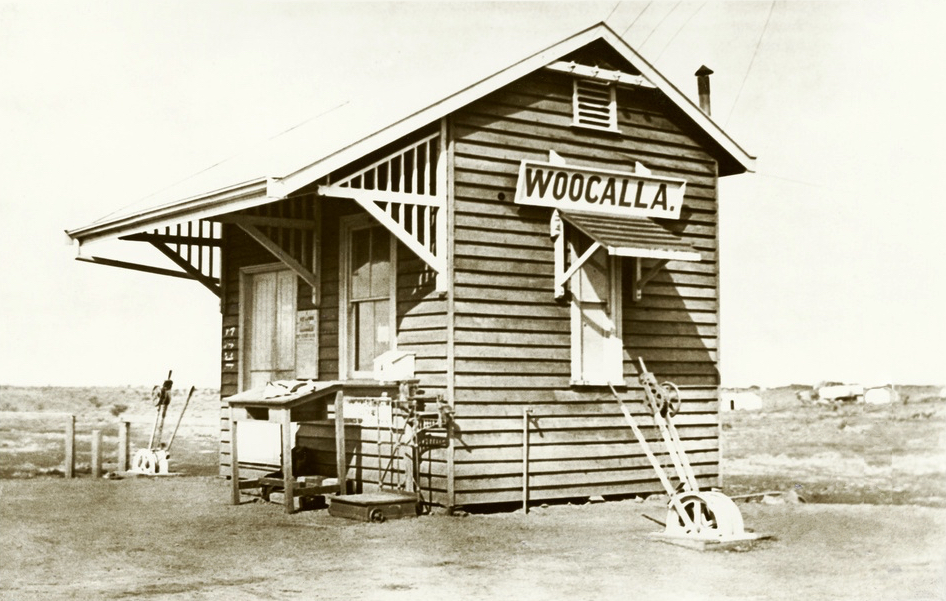
Woocalla station building, its design was common to almost 50 buildings placed at localities along the Trans-Australian Railway

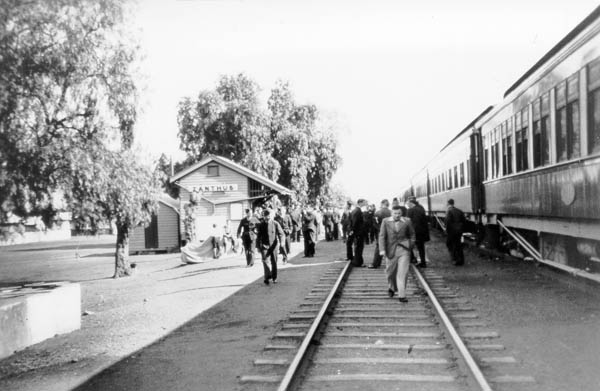
Zanthus circa 1940

When the Trans-Australian Railway was completed in 1917 from Kalgoorlie to Port Augusta, about 50 settlements of various sizes were established along the line, from which maintenance workers kept the track in operational condition. They and their families led an isolated life, although they were supplied with provisions by the Tea & Sugar, a weekly provisions train which also provided banking and postal facilities until it ceased running in 1996.

Passenger trains were hauled by steam locomotives, which required taking on water at various stops along the way. The services from the 1930s to the 1940s required regular stops.

With the introduction of diesel locomotives in the early 1950s, the need for such stops decreased greatly. Subsequently, upgrading to concrete sleepers and continuously welded rail reduced track inspection and maintenance considerably. Since 2001, maintenance work has been undertaken by contractors whose families do not live on the line.

Today most services on the line are freight services operated by Aurizon, Pacific National and SCT Logistics. The only passenger train to traverse the entire line is the Indian Pacific that stops at Cook and Rawlinna. The Ghan travels on part of the Trans-Australian Railway between Port Augusta and Tarcoola but makes no stops before branching north to Darwin.

Nineteen stations on the Trans-Australian Railway were named after people: ten after former prime ministers, two after governors-generals, two after British earls, two after federal ministers, one after a prominent worker in Aboriginal welfare, one after a Premier of Western Australia. and one after a Western Australian doctor. At almost all of the localities, other than Port Augusta and Kalgoorlie, station buildings and most infrastructure was dismantled in the 1990s. Most of these sites are inaccessible by public roads; a few have short airstrips nearby.

Localities on the Trans-Australian Railway and distances from Port Augusta (Note: Values in the table are 92.0 km lower than in the reference since the reference provides distances from Coonamia, the start of the train control district in which the Trans-Australian Railway is located. (92.0 km is the distance between Coonamia and Port Augusta.))
Port Augusta 0 km	Tent Hill 27.5 km	Hesso 54.5 km
Bookaloo 85.0 km	McLeay 118.0 km	Wirrappa 150.0 km
Pimba 181.0 km	Burando 219.0 km	Wirraminna 250.0 km
Coondambo 273.5 km	Kultanaby 302.0 km	Kingoonya 334.5 km
Ferguson 377.0 km	Tarcoola 412.5 km	Malbooma 449.5 km
Lyons (10th PM) 473.0 km	Wynbring 514.5 km	Mount Christie 546.0 km
Mungala 575.0 km	Barton (1st PM) 601.5 km	Bates 633.5 km
Ooldea 684.0 km	Watson (3rd PM) 717.0 km	Fisher (5th PM) 769.5 km
Thomiar 797.0 km	Cook (6th PM) 822.5 km	Denman 864.5 km
Hughes (7th PM) 910.0 km	State border: SA and WA 958.9 km	Deakin (2nd PM) 962.0 km
Reid (4th PM) 1014.5 km	Forrest 1045.5 km	Mundrabilla 1100.0 km
Loongana 1147.5 km	Nurina 1195.0 km	Haig 1239.5 km
Wilban 1277.5 km	Rawlinna 1311.0 km	Naretha 1358.5 km
Boonderoo 1392.0 km	Kitchener 1420.5 km	Goddards 1459.0 km
Zanthus 1480.0 km	Coonana 1519.0 km	Chifley (16th PM)1550.0 km
Karonie 1578.5 km	Blamey 1600.0 km	Curtin (14th PM) 1630.5 km
Golden Ridge 1666.0 km	Parkeston 1684.0 km	Kalgoorlie 1693.5 km
"PM" = Prime Minister of Australia after whom the locality was named.

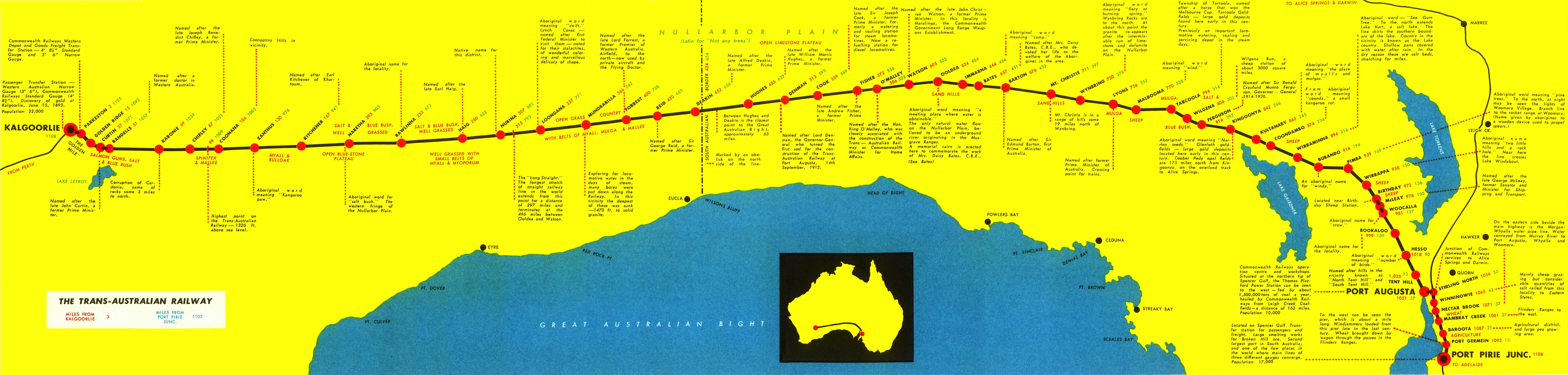
A map given to passengers on the Trans-Australian Railway, circa 1960, showed all localities on the line at that time and the origins of their names
