= City of Kalgoorlie–Boulder =

Coordinates: 30°44′56″S 121°27′58″E

- Local government area
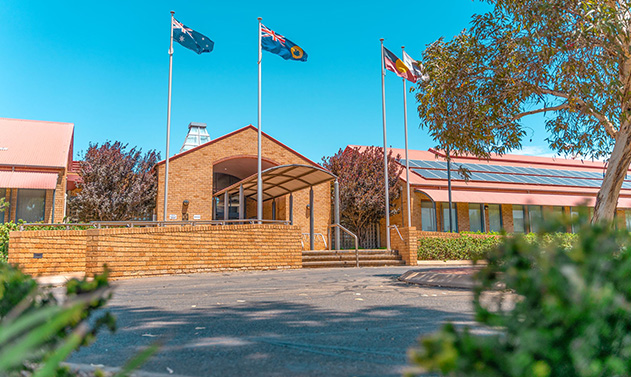
- City office

- Interactive map of City of Kalgoorlie–Boulder
- Country: Australia
- State: Western Australia
- Region: Goldfields–Esperance
- Established: 1989
- Council seat: Kalgoorlie

Government
  - Mayor: Glenn Wilson
  - State electorate: Kalgoorlie
  - Federal division: O'Connor

Area
  - Total: 95,575.1 km^{2} (36,901.8 sq mi)

Population
  - Total: 29,306 (LGA 2021)
- Website: City of Kalgoorlie–Boulder
LGAs around City of Kalgoorlie–Boulder
Menzies	Menzies	Outback Areas (SA)
Coolgardie	City of Kalgoorlie–Boulder	Outback Areas (SA)
Coolgardie	Dundas	Outback Areas (SA)

The City of Kalgoorlie–Boulder is a local government area in the Goldfields–Esperance region of Western Australia, about 550 kilometres (342 mi) east of the state capital, Perth. Its seat of government is the town of Kalgoorlie; all but 244 of the city's population live in either Kalgoorlie or Boulder.

== History ==
This region has a long history of continuous inhabitation and cultivation by Aboriginal Australians.

In the years immediately after discovery of gold in the region, a variety of local government entities sprang up around the often-temporary settlements on the Kalgoorlie goldfields. Only three persisted beyond the early 20th century:

- The Municipality of Kalgoorlie was formed in 1895 and renamed the Town of Kalgoorlie in 1961.
- The Municipality of Boulder was formed in 1897. It became the Town of Boulder in 1961.
- The East Coolgardie Roads Board was formed in 1895. It was renamed the Kalgoorlie Roads Board in 1897 and was made a shire as the Shire of Kalgoorlie in 1961.

The Town of Boulder was merged into the Shire of Kalgoorlie in July 1969, with the combined shire then being renamed the Shire of Boulder in November 1969. The Town of Kalgoorlie and the Shire of Boulder then amalgamated to form the City of Kalgoorlie–Boulder in 1989.

Other early local government areas in the region include:

- Municipality of Broad Arrow (1897–1903)
- Broad Arrow Road District (1899–1922)
- Municipality of Broad Arrow-Paddington (1903–1910)
- Municipality of Bulong (1896–1909)
- Bulong Road District (1899–1911)
- Municipality of Kanowna (1896–1917)
- North East Coolgardie Road District (1896–1922)
- Municipality of Paddington (1901–1903)

== Roads in Kalgoorlie–Boulder ==
- Boulder Road
- Anzac Drive
- Gatacre Drive
- Picadilly Street
- Hannan Street
- Graeme Street
- Maritana Street
- Federal Road
- Croesus St

== Major roads in the region ==
- Goldfields Highway
- Great Eastern Highway

== Origins of the city ==

=== Key dates ===
- 1 July 1961 – Boulder and Kalgoorlie municipalities became towns, and Kalgoorlie Roads Board became a shire, following changes to the Local Government Act
- 1 July 1969 – Town of Boulder was amalgamated into the Shire of Kalgoorlie, which was renamed Shire of Boulder.
- 1 February 1989 – The Shire of Boulder and Town of Kalgoorlie amalgamated to form the City of Kalgoorlie–Boulder.

== Wards ==
The city is not divided into wards and the twelve councillors sit at large. The mayor is elected by popular vote.

== Towns, suburbs and localities ==
The towns, suburbs and localities of the City of Kalgoorlie–Boulder with population and size figures based on the most recent Australian census:

Suburb	Population	Area	Map
Binduli	4 (SAL 2016)	10.4 km^{2} (4.0 sq mi)	
Boorara	0 (SAL 2016)	35.3 km^{2} (13.6 sq mi)	
Boulder	4,872 (SAL 2021)	4.3 km^{2} (1.7 sq mi)	
Broadwood	759 (SAL 2021)	10 km^{2} (3.9 sq mi)	
Brown Hill	0 (SAL 2016)	20.7 km^{2} (8.0 sq mi)	
Bulong	0 (SAL 2016)	1,980 km^{2} (760 sq mi)	
Cundeelee	139 (SAL 2021)	13,241.9 km^{2} (5,112.7 sq mi)	
Emu Flat	8 (SAL 2021)	4,476.5 km^{2} (1,728.4 sq mi)	
Feysville	8 (SAL 2021)	945 km^{2} (365 sq mi)	
Fimiston	0 (SAL 2016)	4.1 km^{2} (1.6 sq mi)	
Forrest	3 (SAL 2021)	31,639.1 km^{2} (12,215.9 sq mi)	
Hannans	2,410 (SAL 2021)	4 km^{2} (1.5 sq mi)	
Kalgoorlie	3,711 (SAL 2021)	4.0 km^{2} (1.5 sq mi)	
Kanowna	12 (SAL 2021)	2,721.1 km^{2} (1,050.6 sq mi)	
Karlkurla	270 (SAL 2021)	40.5 km^{2} (15.6 sq mi)	
Kurnalpi	4 (SAL 2021)	3,571.2 km^{2} (1,378.8 sq mi)	
Lakewood	^{[1]}	17 km^{2} (6.6 sq mi)	
Lamington	2,036 (SAL 2021)	1.2 km^{2} (0.46 sq mi)	
Mullingar	318 (SAL 2021)	57.2 km^{2} (22.1 sq mi)	
Ora Banda	12 (SAL 2021)	1,151.5 km^{2} (444.6 sq mi)	
Parkeston	5 (SAL 2021)	51.6 km^{2} (19.9 sq mi)	
Piccadilly	2,305 (SAL 2021)	1.5 km^{2} (0.58 sq mi)	
Rawlinna	33 (SAL 2021)	22,776.9 km^{2} (8,794.2 sq mi)	
Somerville	4,165 (SAL 2021)	4.7 km^{2} (1.8 sq mi)	
South Boulder	1,506 (SAL 2021)	10.4 km^{2} (4.0 sq mi)	
South Kalgoorlie	4,416 (SAL 2021)	3.1 km^{2} (1.2 sq mi)	
Trafalgar	0 (SAL 2016)	53.8 km^{2} (20.8 sq mi)	
Victory Heights	772 (SAL 2021)	0.9 km^{2} (0.35 sq mi)	
West Kalgoorlie	32 (SAL 2021)	2.1 km^{2} (0.81 sq mi)	
West Lamington	1,373 (SAL 2021)	3 km^{2} (1.2 sq mi)	
Williamstown	124 (SAL 2021)	4.4 km^{2} (1.7 sq mi)	
Yilkari	6 (SAL 2016)	66.8 km^{2} (25.8 sq mi)	
Zanthus	0 (SAL 2016)	12,506.3 km^{2} (4,828.7 sq mi)	

=== Notes ===
- ^[1] For the purpose of the 2021 Australian census, Lakewood was counted as part of Feysville.

== Ghost towns ==
Ghost towns within the City of Kalgoorlie–Boulder:

- Balagundi
- Balgarri
- Bardoc
- Black Flag
- Broad Arrow
- Bulong
- Gindalbie
- Golden Ridge
- Gudarra (formerly Paddington)
- Lakewood
- Loongana
- Mulgarrie
- Waverley
- Windanya

== Heritage-listed places ==
As of 2023, 387 places are heritage-listed in the City of Kalgoorlie–Boulder, of which 62 are on the State Register of Heritage Places, among them the Kalgoorlie railway station, the York and Exchange Hotel and Boulder railway station.
