= Kanowna =

Kanowna is the name of several things

- Kanowna, Western Australia, a ghost town in Western Australia
- TSS Kanowna, an Australian steamer built during 1902 which sank in 1929
- Kanowna Belle Gold Mine, a gold mine in Western Australia
- Electoral district of Kanowna, an electoral district of the Legislative Assembly of Western Australia
