= Electoral results for the district of North-East Coolgardie =

Western Australian district election results

This is a list of electoral results for the Electoral district of North-East Coolgardie in Western Australian state elections.

== Members for North-East Coolgardie ==
Members	Party	Term
Frederick Vosper	Opposition	1897–1901

== Election results ==
=== Elections in the 1890s ===
1897 Western Australian colonial election: North-East Coolgardie
Party	Candidate	Votes	%	±%
Opposition	Frederick Vosper	236	43.0	
Independent	Nathaniel Harper	177	32.2	
Opposition	John Dwyer	69	12.6	
Opposition	Archibald Barclay	67	12.2	
Total formal votes		549	94.8	
Informal votes		30	5.2	
Turnout		579	50.7	
Opposition hold		Swing		
