= Municipality of Bulong =

Former local government area in Western Australia

The Municipality of Bulong was a local government area in Western Australia centred on the mining town of Bulong.

It was established on 13 November 1896, separating the Bulong township from the North-East Coolgardie Road District. The gazetting of a municipality followed lobbying from the Bulong Progress Committee, which passed on a sum of £217 to the new council upon its establishment.

The first election was held on 21 December 1896, with E. H. B. Macartney elected the first Mayor of Bulong. The council consisted of a directly elected mayor and six councillors. It initially met in temporary council chambers in Colin Street, before completing construction of permanent chambers in Reid Street in 1897. The council grappled with the issues of establishing many basic amenities for the town, including establishing a cemetery, fire brigade, and recreation reserve, with the recreation reserve formally vested in the council in 1898.

The municipality was enlarged in 1898 due to growth of the township.

Later mayors of Bulong included James Townsend (1900-1903) and R. C. Jones.

In 1906, amidst declining revenue, it decreased the wages of the town clerk and labourer. In later years, the cessation or removal of public services to the struggling township were a recurring issue for the council.

The municipality ceased to exist on 10 December 1909, when amidst "decreasing population and dying mines", it merged into the surrounding Bulong Road District, with which it had co-existed since 1899. A petition of ratepayers had been sent to the Colonial Secretary requesting the abolition.

In 1948, the old municipality's seal was found in the bush and handed to the Eastern Goldfields branch of the Western Australian Historical Society and then to the State Archives.
