= Parkeston =

Parkeston may refer to:

- Parkeston, Essex
- Parkeston, Western Australia

== See also ==
- Parkston, South Dakota
