= Bardoc =

Bardoc may refer to:

- Bardoc, a small town in Western Australia
- Bardóc, the Hungarian name for Brăduț Commune, Covasna County, Romania
