= Acacia incognita =

False sugar brother

Scientific classification
- Kingdom: Plantae
- Clade: Embryophytes
- Clade: Tracheophytes
- Clade: Spermatophytes
- Clade: Angiosperms
- Clade: Eudicots
- Clade: Rosids
- Order: Fabales
- Family: Fabaceae
- Subfamily: Caesalpinioideae
- Clade: Mimosoid clade
- Genus: Acacia
- Species: A. incognita

Binomial name
- Acacia incognita Maslin & Buscumb
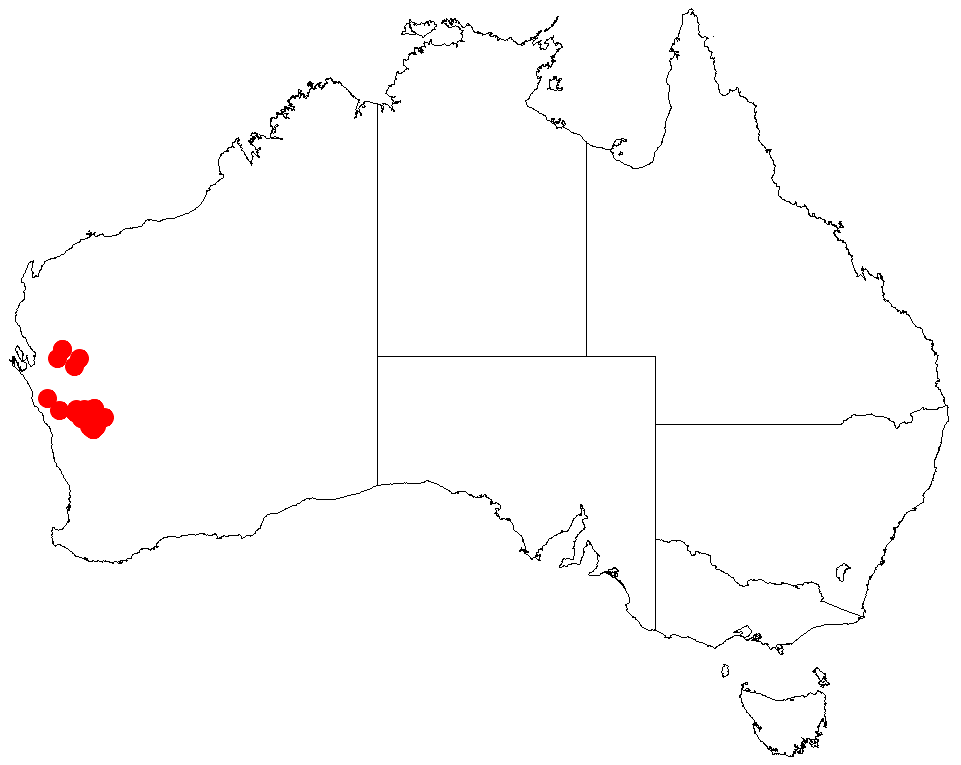
- Occurrence data from AVH

Species of legume

Acacia incognita, also known as false sugar brother, is a species of flowering plant in the family Fabaceae and is endemic to the north-west of Western Australia. It is a inverted cone-shaped shrub or tree with the main stems slightly crooked and with fissured grey bark, often subterete to flat phyllodes, spherical to oblong heads of golden yellow flowers, and terete, thinly papery to crusty pods.

== Description ==
Acacia incognita is an inverted cone-shaped shrub or tree that typically grows to a height of 3–5 m (9.8–16.4 ft), its main stems slightly crooked with grey, fissured bark. Its branchlets often have a thin veneer of resin, and silvery hairs between obscure ribs, or sometimes glabrous. The phyllodes are often subterete to flat or terete, mostly 70–120 mm (2.8–4.7 in) long and 10–12 mm (0.39–0.47 in) wide, ascending to erect with many fine longitudinal veins.

The flowers are golden yellow and borne in one, occasionally two, spherical to short oblong heads 4–6 mm (0.16–0.24 in) long and 4–5 mm (0.16–0.20 in) wide when dry, in axils, on a peduncle usually 4–6 mm (0.16–0.24 in) long. Flowering mostly occurs in September and October, sometimes in other months, and the pods are terete, thinly leathery to crusty, up to 35–100 mm (1.4–3.9 in) long and 1–2 mm (0.039–0.079 in) wide. The seeds are narrowly elliptic to narrowly oblong, about 3–5 mm (0.12–0.20 in) long with a white to creamy white aril on the end.

== Taxonomy ==
Acacia incognita was first formally described in 2008 by Bruce Maslin and Carrie Buscumb in the journal Nuytsia from specimens collected near the Gindalbie mine near-east of Perenjori in 2008. The specific epithet (incognita) means 'unknown', referring to the identity of this species having been unrecognised on account of its superficial resemblance to A. coolgardiensis.

== Distribution and habitat ==
False sugar brother occurs from near Mullewa and Yalgoo and south to Karara Station (about 80 km (50 mi) east of Morawa and is often locally common. It grows in semi-arid areas in loam or loamy clay in open or mallee woodland or shrubland in the Avon Wheatbelt, Carnarvon, Geraldton Sandplains, Murchison and Yalgoo bioregions of north-western Western Australia.

== Conservation status ==
Acacia inaequiloba is listed as 'not threatened' by the Western Australian Government Department of Biodiversity, Conservation and Attractions.

== See also ==
- List of Acacia species
