= Kunanalling, Western Australia =

Abandoned town in Western Australia

Kunanalling Western Australia
- Coordinates: 30.682°S 121.068°E
- Established: 1896
- Postcode(s): 6430
- Elevation: 407 m (1,335 ft)
- Location: 580 km (360 mi) ENE of Perth; 32 km (20 mi) north of Coolgardie
- LGA(s): Shire of Coolgardie
- State electorate(s): Eyre
- Federal division(s): O'Connor

Kunanalling is an abandoned town in Western Australia located between Coolgardie and Balgarri along the Coolgardie North Road in the Goldfields-Esperance region of Western Australia. It is located in the Shire of Coolgardie.

In 1895 gold was discovered in the area by prospectors and it was initially known as 25 mile, its distance from Coolgardie. The goldfields warden recommended that a townsite be declared in the same area. The town was also called Connanalling but the spelling was changed by the Lands Department when the town was gazetted in 1896. By early 1898 the town had a population of 360 people, and later grew to approximately 800 people.

The ruins of a hotel and three chimneys still remain in the old townsite.
