= Kundana, Western Australia =

Abandoned town in Western Australia

Kundana Western Australia
- Coordinates: 30.705°S 121.226°E
- Established: 1897
- Postcode(s): 6430
- Elevation: 347 m (1,138 ft)
- Location: 586 km (364 mi) ENE of Perth; 28 km (17 mi) north of Coolgardie
- LGA(s): Shire of Coolgardie
- State electorate(s): Eyre
- Federal division(s): O'Connor

Kundana is an abandoned town in Western Australia located between Coolgardie and Bardoc in the Goldfields–Esperance region of Western Australia.

After 58 miners petitioned the government to have the townsite declared in 1896 the town was declared the following year. The area was initially known as Barkers Find after the prospector who first found gold in the area, and later was known as 21 mile. When the townsite was surveyed in 1896 the surveyor, he used the name White Flag that was also in common usage. Later still the surveyor general suggested the name Barkerton. The present name of Kundana was suggested by the surveyor, H. S. King, using the Aboriginal word, the meaning of which is not known.
