= Rawlinna, Western Australia =

Remote locality in Western Australia

Rawlinna
- Town
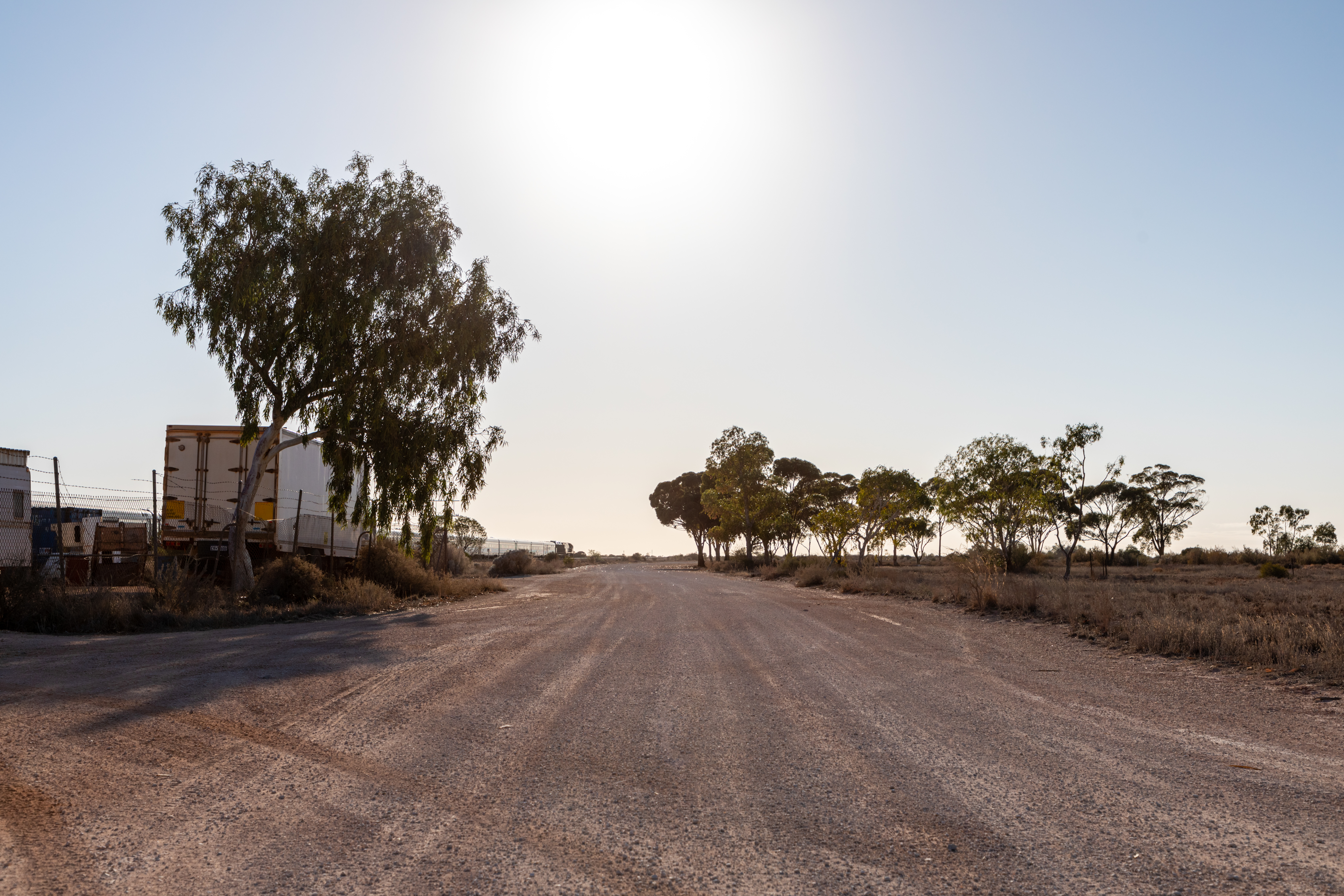

- Interactive map of Rawlinna
- Coordinates: 31°0.538′S 125°19.915′E
- Country: Australia
- State: Western Australia
- LGA: City of Kalgoorlie-Boulder
- Location: 910 km (570 mi) east of Perth; 350 km (220 mi) west of the Western Australia border; 1,190 km (740 mi) west of Port Augusta

Government
  - State electorate: Eyre
  - Federal division: O'Connor

Area
  - Total: 22,776.9 km^{2} (8,794.2 sq mi)
- Elevation: 183 m (600 ft)

Population
  - Total: 33 (SAL 2021)
- Postcode: 6434

Rawlinna is an isolated locality on the Trans-Australian Railway in Western Australia, about 900 kilometres (560 miles) east of Perth, 380 kilometres (240 mi) east of Kalgoorlie and 350 kilometres (220 miles) west of the Western Australia / South Australia border. It is on the Nullarbor Plain, about 50 kilometres (30 miles) from its western fringe; the topography is flat and well grassed, with saltbush and bluebush, with small belts of myall and myoporum trees. Annual rainfall is 288 millimetres (11.3 inches). Maximum daytime temperatures are typically 38 °C (100 °F) through summer and 19 °C (66 °F) during winter. The population in the wider Rawlinna area was recorded as 33 people in the 2021 Australian census; there were 7 private dwellings.

Rawlinna is at the southernmost end of the Connie Sue Highway, a 4-wheel drive track that extends 650 km (400 mi) north to the Aboriginal community of Warburton. Rawlinna comes under the jurisdiction of the City of Kalgoorlie-Boulder, situated 380 km (240 mi) to the west.

Adjoining the railway line is Australia's largest operating sheep station, Rawlinna Station, covering an area slightly more than 1.0 million hectares (2.5 million acres or 3900 square miles): about the area of the Sydney conurbation. It runs up to 65,000 Merino sheep in a good season. Mustering and droving are done on motorbikes and in aircraft to locate them, beginning in January for a 10-week shearing program. A muster can take up to 100 kilometres (62 miles) to get the sheep into the shearing shed at Jumbuck's "Depot" outstation.

A small, open-cut limestone mine is 2 km (1.2 mi) north of the settlement, from which lime is extracted for gold production at Kalgoorlie.

Visitors come from far and wide each year to the popular gymkhana known as the "Nullarbor Muster", which benefits a number of charities.

== Trans-Australian Railway ==
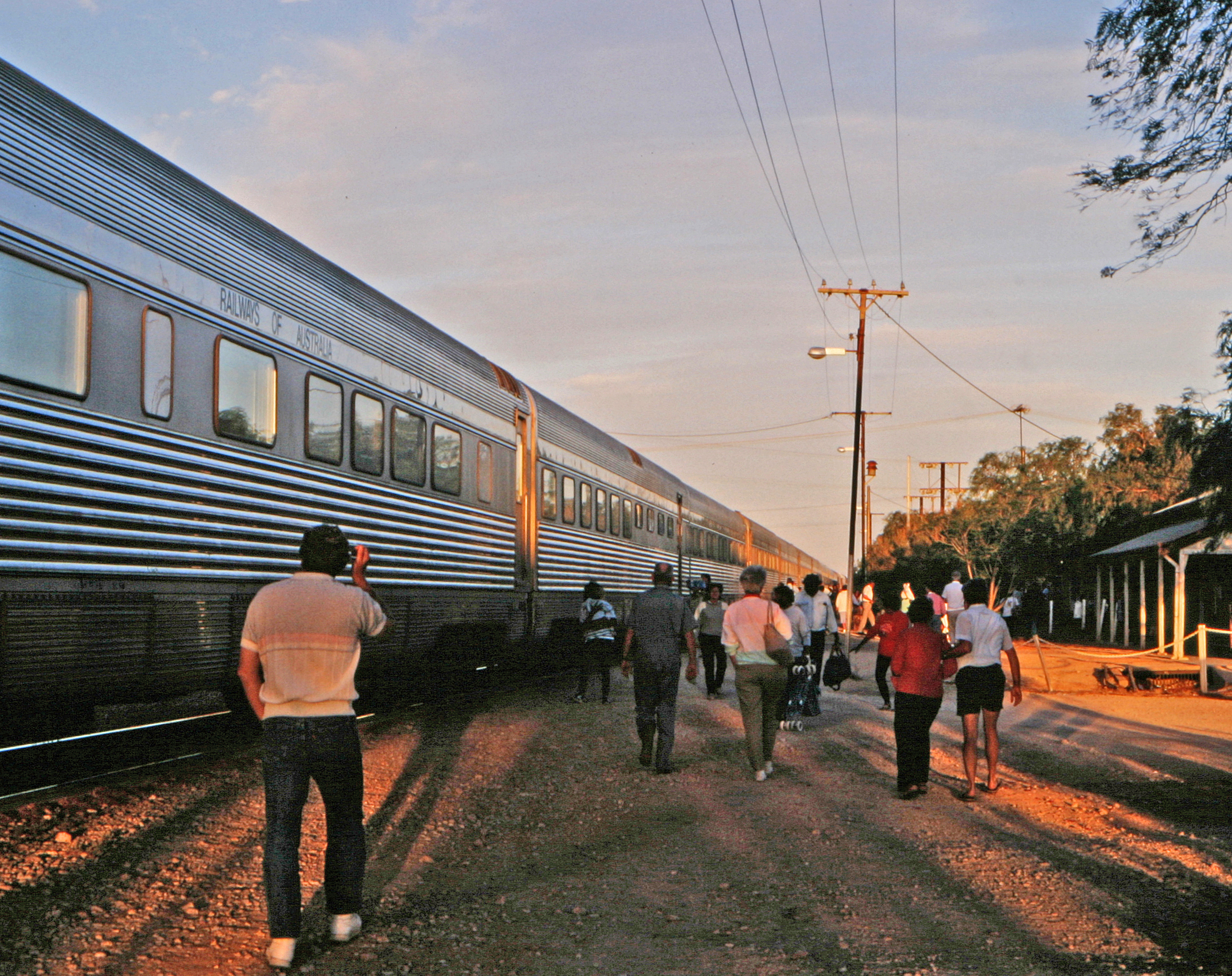
The Indian Pacific at Rawlinna.

Rawlinna was a replenishment stop for freight trains and the Commonwealth Railways passenger train, the Great Western Express, which was inaugurated in 1917 (when the line was opened) and its successor, the Trans-Australian. Before 1951, when diesel locomotives were introduced, steam locomotives needed frequent replenishment with water. On the Trans-Australian Railway, frequent servicing was also required because of poor water quality; Rawlinna was one of four major stations that had workshops and facilities such as a food store and bakery operated by the Commonwealth Railways, and a school which took part in an annual inter-school sports day alongside students from Cook and Tarcoola. Diesel-hauled passenger trains only need to stop to refill water in the passenger cars. That factor, combined with changed technologies – such as concrete sleepers, modern rail fastenings, continuous welded rail and mechanised track maintenance by contractors – eliminated the need for local employees. With trains travelling faster – 125 kilometres per hour (78 miles per hour) passenger, 110 kilometres per hour (68 miles per hour) freight – train crews no longer rested at Rawlinna, staying instead at Parkeston and Cook. About 10 buildings remain.

When the entire Sydney–Perth line was converted to 1435 mm (4 ft 8 1/2 in) standard gauge in 1970, the passenger train service was re-named the Indian Pacific.

Preceding station	Journey Beyond	Following station
Kalgoorlie One-way operation	Indian Pacific	Cook towards Sydney
Perth Terminus	Indian Pacific	Cook One-way operation
