= Boulder bombings =

1942 bombings in Western Australia

- Location: Boulder, Western Australia
- Date: February 2, 1942; 84 years ago
- Attack type: Bombing, murder–suicide
- Deaths: 15 (including the perpetrator)
- Injuries: 15
- Perpetrator: Pero Raecivich

On 2 February 1942, Pero Raecivich committed a series of bombings in the outback mining community of Boulder, Western Australia, killing 15 people, including himself, and injuring 15 others. The bombings are the deadliest act of mass murder in modern Western Australian history.

== Events ==
The first bombing took place at 16 Milton Street, a boarding house where 30 men were gathered in the dining room playing cards and gambling. At roughly 12:10 am, a metal container of gelignite exploded in the room, instantly killing seven people. Portions of the roof and walls were reported to have collapsed as a result of the explosion.

This was followed twenty minutes later by two bombings at another boarding house, which formerly operated as Launceston Hotel before being delicensed, where Raecivich had been living. Witnesses recalled seeing Raecivich coming onto the back verandah with two lit gelignite bombs, throwing one into a kitchen, and another at a water tank in an attempt to explode it. Raecivich then entered into a physical struggle with Dusan "Dick" Boskovich, a bystander in the vicinity, striking him multiple times and dropping a knife before fleeing. The explosions at the former hotel failed to kill anyone, but did injure several.

A final explosion took place at around 2:00 am. Its cause was unknown until Reverend W. R. Forbes went to organise a funeral at Boulder Cemetery and discovered Raecivich's remains "scattered over a 100-yard radius".

Eight additional victims died in hospital of their injuries over several days, raising the death toll to 15.

== Victims ==
Many of the victims were natives of what was then Yugoslavia, and had been living in Australia as mine workers. Kalgoorlie-Boulder historian Tim Moore posited the victims' ethnic background was significant, given the timing of the attacks coinciding with the Nazi occupation of Yugoslavia.

List of victims killed

- Primo Bertelli, 37
- Peter Bokan, 56
- Vido Durasevich, 46
- Stipan Dodig, 46
- Mate Franich, 28
- Mate Grgich, 43
- Mate Krivich, 42
- Juro Masanovich
- Jure Masich, 42
- Mirko Misetich, 30
- Grgo Selak, 45
- Angelidis C. Stefanou, 29
- Joze Vegar, 36
- Ivan Viskovich, 45

— Sources:

== Perpetrator ==
45-year-old mine worker Pero Raecivich (also spelled Raicevich) was identified as the perpetrator by numerous witnesses and through the identification of his remains by a wart on his neck. One witness stated that Raecivich was a quiet man who never threatened anyone. Conversely, another stated that he had heard Raecivich say "it would be better to blow all this up" after losing a game of rummy.

While a motive was not made public, in the investigation that followed the attacks, Coroner T. Ansell stated writings found in Raecivich's room may have indicated one. However, these findings were not revealed.
