= Balgarri, Western Australia =

Abandoned town in Western Australia

Balgarri Western Australia
- Coordinates: 30°29′S 121°07′E
- Established: 1898
- Postcode(s): 6431
- Elevation: 397 m (1,302 ft)
- Location: 640 km (398 mi) ENE of Perth; 45 km (28 mi) NNW of Kalgoorlie
- LGA(s): City of Kalgoorlie-Boulder
- State electorate(s): Electoral district of Kalgoorlie
- Federal division(s): O'Connor

Balgarri is an abandoned town in Western Australia 45 km north-northwest of Kalgoorlie. It is between Black Flag and Ora Banda in the Goldfields-Esperance region of Western Australia.

The town's name is Aboriginal in origin and its meaning is not known. Initially known as Forty Two Mile the town was gazetted as Balgarri in 1898.
