= Balagundi, Western Australia =

Abandoned town in Western Australia

Balagundi Western Australia
- Coordinates: 30.727°S 121.682°E
- Established: 1896
- Postcode(s): 6430
- Elevation: 414 m (1,358 ft)
- Location: 615 km (382 mi) ENE of Perth; 20 km (12 mi) east of Kalgoorlie
- LGA(s): City of Kalgoorlie-Boulder
- State electorate(s): Electoral district of Kalgoorlie
- Federal division(s): O'Connor

Balagundi is an abandoned town in Western Australia, 20 km east of Kalgoorlie. It is between Kalgoorlie and Bulong in the Goldfields-Esperance region of Western Australia within the City of Kalgoorlie-Boulder.

The town derives its name from a nearby well; it is Aboriginal in origin and its meaning is not known. Following a campaign by the local progress association, the town was gazetted on 26 August 1896.

Gold mining is the main industry in the area, with at least one mine still operating close to the town and further exploration being carried out.
