= Shire of Boulder =

Former local government area in Western Australia

The Shire of Boulder was a local government area in Western Australia. It was established as the East Coolgardie Road District on 15 February 1895. It was renamed the Kalgoorlie Road District on 24 September 1897. The board's offices were located at 39 Porter Street, Kalgoorlie; the building survives today and has been classified by the National Trust of Australia.

It expanded significantly over subsequent decades as it absorbed abolished road districts in the region, absorbing the Bulong Road District on 9 June 1911, the Broad Arrow Road District on 7 July 1922 and the Kanowna Road District on 15 September 1922.

It was declared a shire and named the Shire of Kalgoorlie with effect from 1 July 1961 following the passage of the Local Government Act 1960, which reformed all remaining road districts into shires. The membership of the council increased from 9 members to 11 members on 9 December 1966. On 1 July 1969, it absorbed the abolished Town of Boulder, expanding to include an urban area for the first time. It was then renamed the Shire of Boulder on 12 December 1969.

It was divided into wards (three wards of three members and two wards of two members) on 9 December 1977. The Central Ward was increased from three to four members and the Pastoral Ward decreased from two to one member on 22 January 1988.

It amalgamated with the Town of Kalgoorlie to form the City of Kalgoorlie-Boulder on 1 February 1989.

== Chairmen and presidents ==
The following people served as chairman of the Kalgoorlie Roads Board or president of the Shire of Kalgoorlie/Shire of Boulder:

=== Presidents of the Shire of Kalgoorlie ===
- Norman Henry Johns (1961-1965)
- Charles (Digger) Pearson Daws (1965-1969)

=== Presidents of the Shire of Boulder ===
- Vivian (Viv) Edward Watts (1969-1970)
- William Joseph Kenneally (1970-1975)
- Edward (Jack) Usher (1975–1976)
- Douglas (Doug) Charles Daws (1976-1979)
- Charles (Digger) Pearson Daws (1979-1988)
- Edgar (Ted) George Winner (1988-1989)
