= Kanowna Road District =

Former local government area in Western Australia

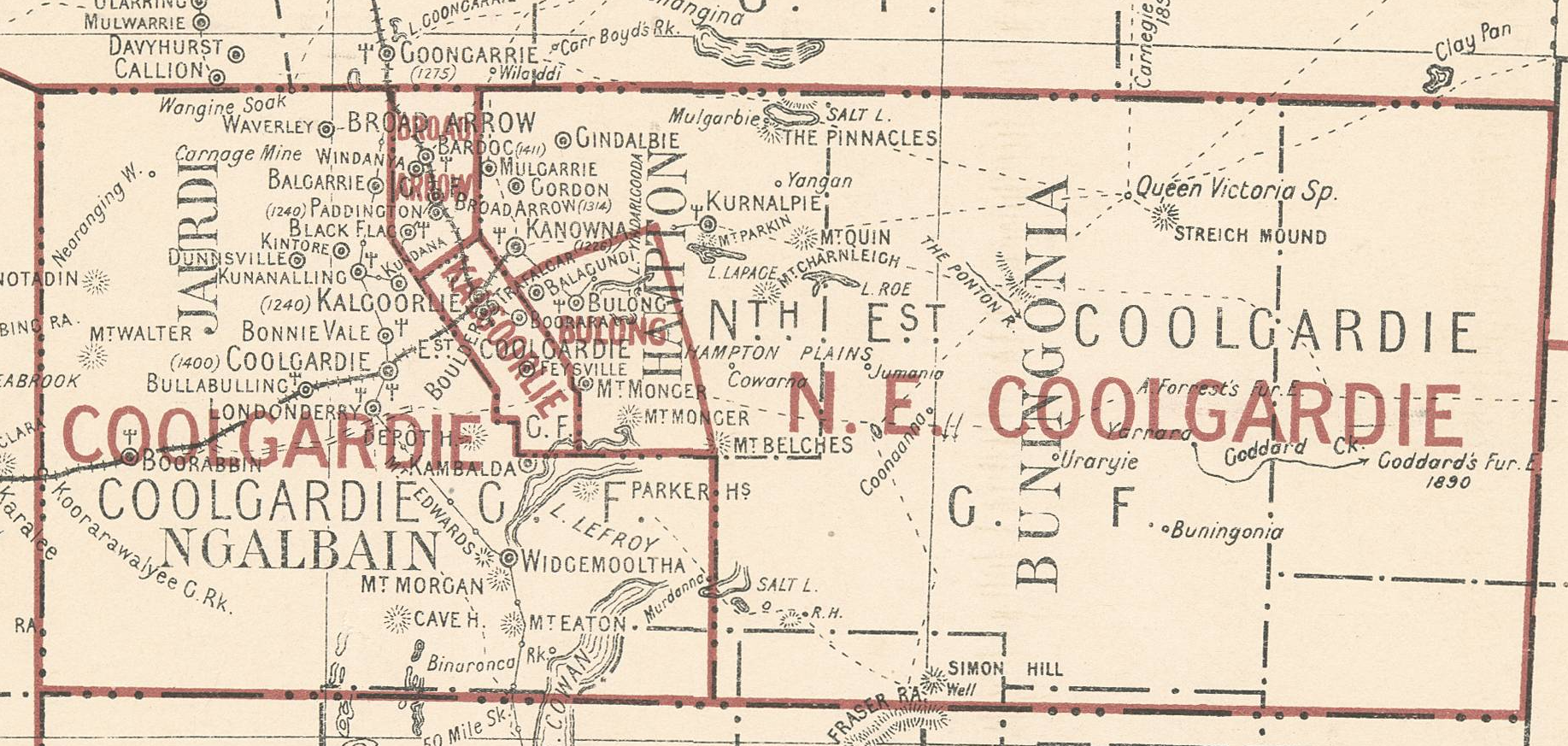
North East Coolgardie and surrounding road districts, 1905

The Kanowna Road District was an early form of local government area on the Western Australian goldfields.

It was established on 19 June 1896 as the North East Coolgardie Road District, providing basic local government to the rural areas around the mining town of Kanowna, which had already been incorporated as the Municipality of Kanowna four months earlier on 28 February. The board's offices were based in Larkin Street in Kanowna township, although that was located outside the road board boundaries.

A section of the district separated as the Menzies Road District on 31 May 1912.

The Municipality of Kanowna merged into the road district on 26 January 1917, as a result of which it was renamed the Kanowna Road District on the same day. The road district was also divided into two wards at that time: one for the township and one for the rural areas. The road board relocated to the former Kanowna council chambers in Golconda Street, Kanowna following the amalgamation.

It ceased to exist on 15 September 1922, when it was merged into the Kalgoorlie Road District.
