= Town of Boulder =

Former local government area in Western Australia

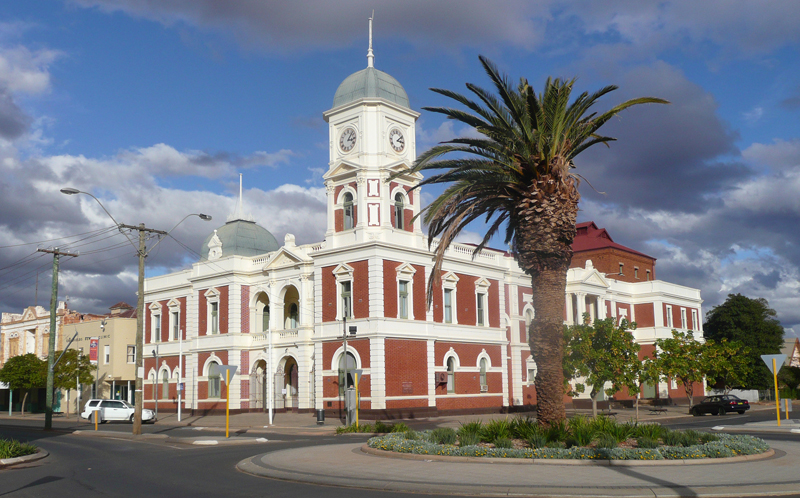
The Boulder Town Hall, the council's former headquarters

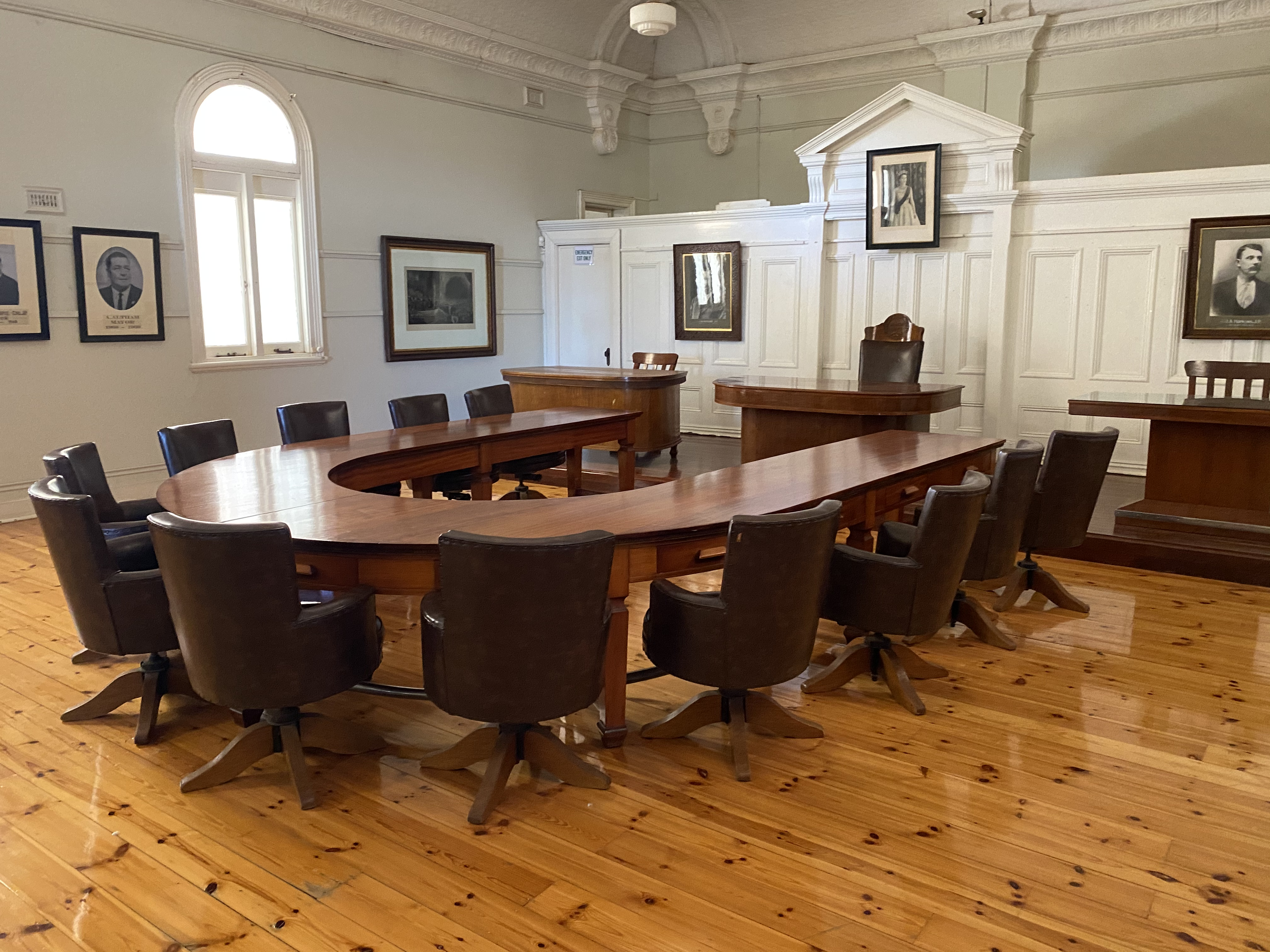
Former Council Chambers

The Town of Boulder was a local government area in Western Australia, centred on the town of Boulder.

It was established as the Municipality of Boulder on 6 August 1897. It was given town status as the Town of Boulder on 1 July 1961.

The municipality was responsible for the construction of the Boulder Town Hall as its new headquarters in 1907-08.

It ceased to exist on 1 July 1969, when it was absorbed into the neighbouring Shire of Kalgoorlie, which was subsequently renamed the Shire of Boulder in November that year.

== Mayors ==
The following people served as mayors of the Boulder council:

- John Marquis Hopkins (1897-1900)
- James Albert Hopkins (1900-1902)
- William Thomas Rabbish (1902-1905)
- James Lyon Johnston (1905-1908)
- John Mills Waddell (1908-1909)
- Charles Robert Davies OBE (1909-1912)
- Henry Glance (1912-1915)
- Stephen Beston (1915-1919)
- James Albert Rogers (1919-1922)
- George Henry Rainsford (1922-1928)
- Walter Forrester Coath (1928-1944)
- John Denis Teahan (1944-1954)
- John Michael Adrenne Cunningham (1954-1955)
- Arthur Alexander James Gillespie (1955-1968)
- Adam Altham (1968-1969)

== See also ==
- Town of Kalgoorlie#Mayors
