= Zanthus, Western Australia =

Zanthus Western Australia
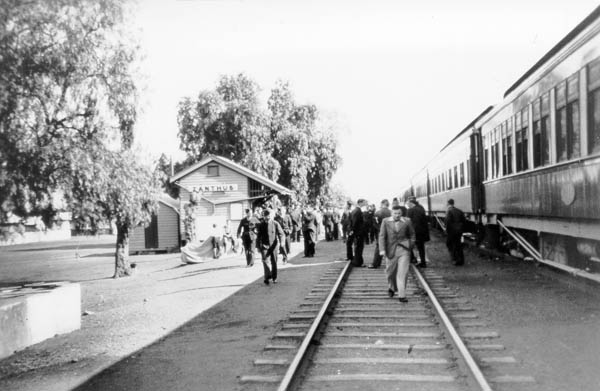
- Zanthus circa 1940

- Coordinates: 31°02′00″S 123°34′00″E
- Population: 0 (2021)
- Postcode(s): 6434
- Location: 799 km (496 mi) E of the Perth; 211 km (131 mi) E of Kalgoorlie
- LGA(s): City of Kalgoorlie–Boulder
- Region: Goldfields–Esperance
- State electorate(s): Eyre
- Federal division(s): O'Connor

Zanthus is a remote and uninhabited outpost on the Trans-Australian Railway approximately 210 kilometres (130 mi) east of Kalgoorlie in Western Australia.

== History ==
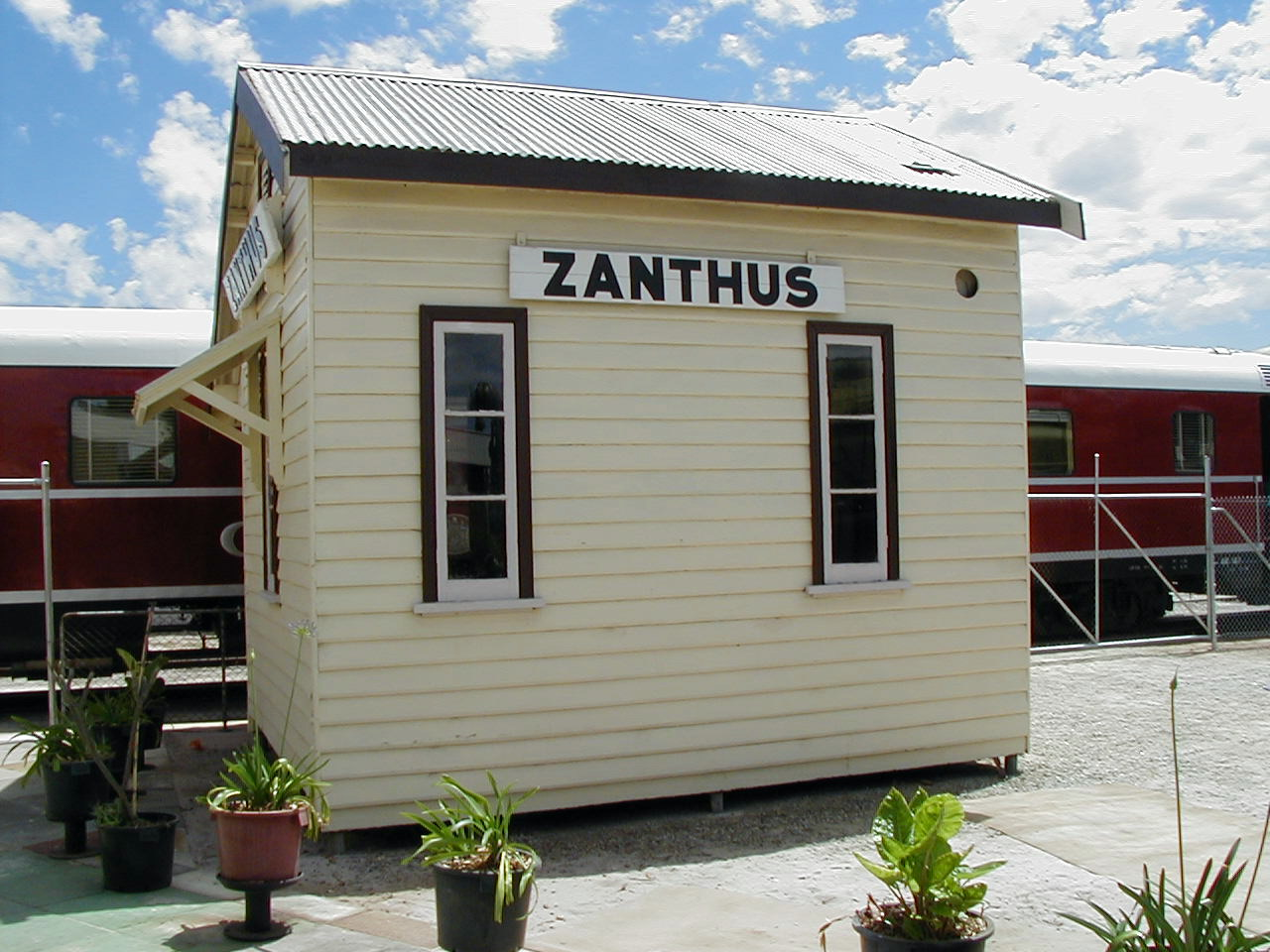
Zanthus station building now at the Railway Museum in Bassendean

Zanthus was established as a railway town during the construction of the Trans-Australian Railway. Trains arrived in 1915 mostly carrying materials to the railhead from Kalgoorlie. The 1933 Australian census recorded Zanthus as having nine dwellings and a population of 47. As at the 2021 Australian census, Zanthus had a population of zero.

In 1996 the timber station building was donated to Rail Heritage WA and relocated to the Railway Museum in Bassendean.

Passengers were stranded at Zanthus in 1948 when a train was delayed resulting from floodwaters causing washaways along the tracks between Zanthus and Kalgoorlie. Several passengers completed the journey to Kalgoorlie via a Goldfield Airways aeroplane while over 50 men worked to fix the two big washaways.

A derailment of a train occurred in 1953 when five carriages of an eastbound transcontinental express left the tracks near the town tearing up a section of the line. Repair crews worked through the night and built a deviation by the following day.

In 1975, large amounts of rain had inundated inland Western Australia from the remnants of Cyclone Trixie. A large washaway close to Zanthus had resulted in the closure of the line. A new bridge was constructed as part of the repairs in just two weeks.

Zanthus has a crossing loop on the line. On 8 August 1999, an Indian Pacific passenger train collided with a stationary freight train.

The locality also has notoriety due to its position in place name lists of Western Australia.
