= Credo Station =

Former pastoral lease in Western Australia

Coordinates: 30°27′55.73″S 120°49′40.91″E

Location in Western Australia

Credo is a former pastoral lease located about 70 kilometres (43 mi) north of Coolgardie in the Goldfields of Western Australia.

The station occupies an area of 212,000 hectares (523,863 acres). The pastoral lease was acquired by the Department of Environment and Conservation in 2007 and is now used as a tourist destination, offering overnight stays in the six dongas on the site.

The explorer Ernest Giles passed through the area in 1875 and had an encounter at nearby Ularring Rock with an Aboriginal tribe.

The station was set up by William Henry Halford, who arrived in the area in 1904 after departing from Mintabying in South Australia in 1903, via Fowlers Bay, Eucla and Balladonia.

The station is divided into two sections; the Halford homestead is on the Black Flag area and is split from the other part by Carbine Station. The second area contains another homestead along with holding yards and shearing sheds. The station contains many native trees, including black oak, salmon gum and gimlet with underbrush such as wattle, blue bush and salt bush.

The Halford family set up the Overland Dairy near Kalgoorlie and started to run cattle from Binyarinyinna near Lake Cowan to Kalgoorlie and acquiring pastoral leases. The family set up a homestead at Black Flag, and Credo was initially an outstation. Credo itself was established in 1906–1907.

The station switched from cattle to sheep in about 1924 to focus on wool production. Properties in the area were dependent on dams rather than wells for watering stock. Well made dams are scattered every few miles over the property with at least one in every paddock. The dams also came in handy for the many prospectors who came to the region to look for gold. Many old mines once operated in the area, including Black Flag, Four in Hand, Bountiful, Crown and Golden Buckle.

Continuing to produce quality wool, the station (W. H. Halford and Sons) sold 16 bales of wool at the Perth wool auction in 1927 for 22¾d per pound for AAE grade combings, followed by another 34 bales at the second sales that sold at an average of 22d.

W. H. Halford died in April 1928 in Dangin, where he had retired to.

The station shore 8,500 sheep in July 1928 with a team of four shearers and a full crew of shed hands. About 8,000 were the current season's lambs, with 120 bales of wool being produced. The wool was sent to Broad Arrow to be railed to Fremantle, with the wool being described as "clean and bright". This followed what was described as a dry season with only 3 inches (76 mm) of rain falling since the beginning of the year.

By August 1929 the station had approximately 10,000 sheep on the property. The Halfords purchased and took delivery of another 40 merino stud rams from the Anama Stud later the same month.

In 1930 the first shearing run of 7,269 sheep produced 199 bales, but stragglers would increase this total. In 1932 the station shore 10,000 sheep for approximately 300 bales, then in 1933 10,000 were sheared for 309 bales.

At the 1935 wool sales Credo sold off about 80 bales of wool for prices between 18d. to 12d. per pound.

A 45-year-old woman living at Credo, Alice Donaldson, collapsed from an apparent heart attack and died en route to Kalgoorlie in 1948. A stockman named Henry Donaldson was thrown from his horse in 1950 when it ran into a fence. Donaldson's legs were badly hurt as a result of the accident.

700 head of sheep were sold off from the property in December 1950.

Rowles Lagoon, a large natural pool, is found within the station boundaries. The pool is approximately 3 miles (5 km) in circumference and used to attract people from the surrounding areas to go swimming. It is also home to a species of native ducks and was once a popular duck-shooting spot.

== See also ==
- List of ranches and stations
