= Bulong Road District =

Former local government area in Australia

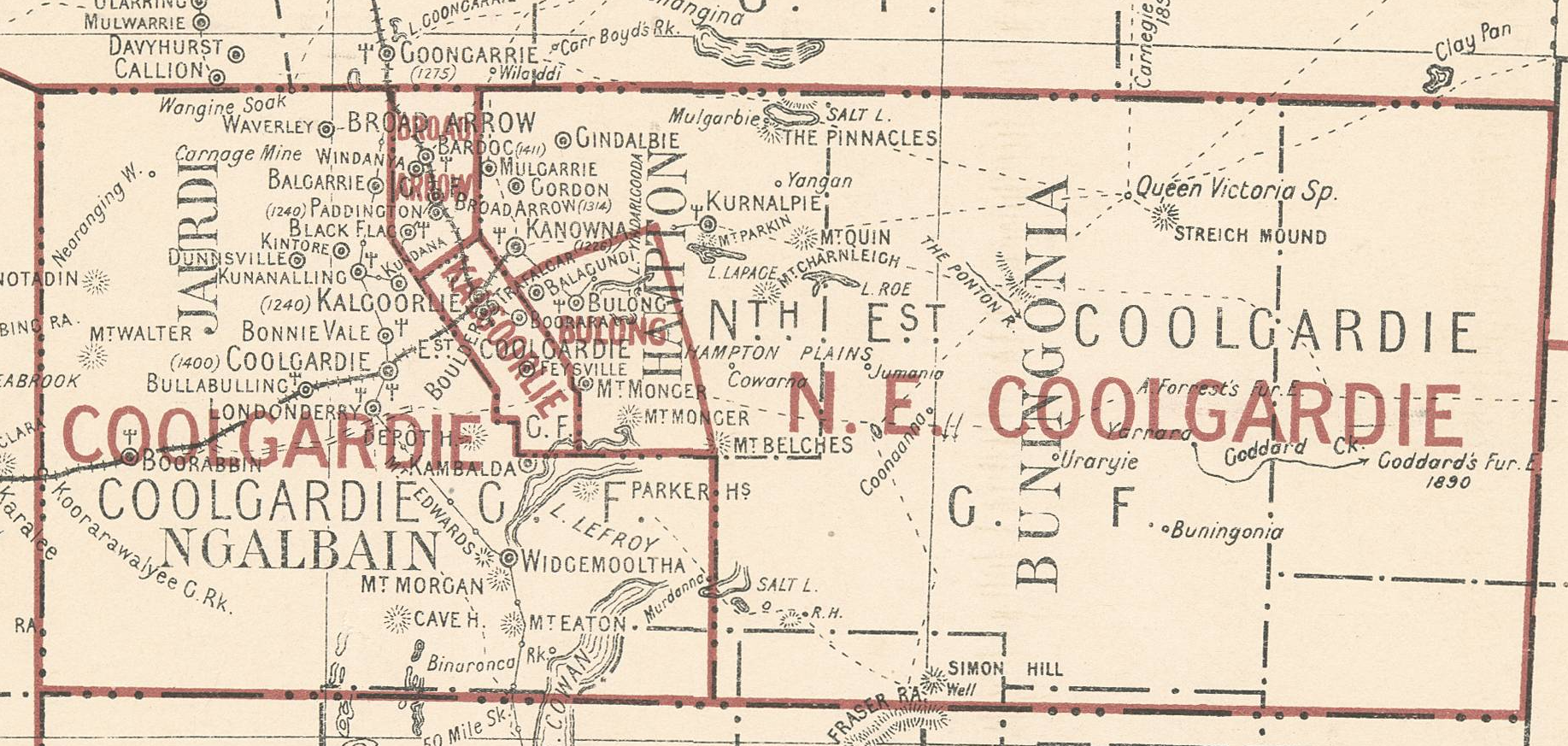
Bulong (centre) and surrounding road districts, 1905

The Bulong Road District was an early local government area on the Eastern Goldfields of Western Australia.

It was formally established on 20 December 1899, providing a basic form of local government to the rural areas around the mining town of Bulong, which had already incorporated as the Municipality of Bulong in 1896. However, it took several months before the road board had practically established itself, and in March 1900 the Kalgoorlie Sun wrote: "...a roads board has been gazetted for Bulong, all on its own. But now they have their roads board, they don't know what to do with it." The first road board election took place on 3 April 1900. The road board met at the municipality's office, the council chambers, in Bulong township.

It absorbed the Municipality of Bulong on 10 December 1909, with the municipality having voluntarily agreed to amalgamate for economic efficiencies, having arguably been spurred on by the passage of legislation allowing the state government to dissolve municipalities whose general rate revenue did not total £750 per annum.

It formally ceased to exist on 9 June 1911, when it was merged into the Kalgoorlie Road District.
