= Gindalbie, Western Australia =

Abandoned town in Western Australia

Gindalbie Western Australia
- Coordinates: 30.33°S 121.746°E
- Established: 1903
- Postcode(s): 6430
- Elevation: 413 m (1,355 ft)
- Location: 650 km (404 mi) ENE of Perth; 55 km (34 mi) NE of Kalgoorlie
- LGA(s): City of Kalgoorlie-Boulder
- State electorate(s): Electoral district of Kalgoorlie
- Federal division(s): O'Connor

Gindalbie is an abandoned town in the Goldfields-Esperance region of Western Australia. It is situated between Kalgoorlie and Laverton along the Donkey Rocks Road.

The town's name is Aboriginal in origin and is the local name for the area. The town was gazetted on 9 September 1903. While in planning, the name of Vosperton was proposed in honour of the editor of the Coolgardie Miner, Frederick Vosper, who became the MLA for North-East Coolgardie in 1897. The planned boundaries and area of the town were changed in 1900.
