= Feysville, Western Australia =

Abandoned town in Western Australia

Feysville
- Town
- Interactive map of Feysville
- Coordinates: 30.955°S 121.604°E
- Country: Australia
- State: Western Australia
- LGA: City of Kalgoorlie-Boulder
- Location: 620 km (390 mi) ENE of Perth; 25 km (16 mi) SE of Kalgoorlie
- Established: 1898

Government
  - State electorate: Electoral district of Kalgoorlie
  - Federal division: O'Connor

Area
  - Total: 945 km^{2} (365 sq mi)
- Elevation: 359 m (1,178 ft)

Population
  - Total: 8 (SAL 2021)
- Postcode: 6431

Feysville is an abandoned town in the Goldfields-Esperance region of Western Australia. It is situated between Kalgoorlie and Kambalda just off the Goldfields Highway.

Alluvial gold was found in the area in 1895 by the prospector Dennis O'Callaghan, which sparked a gold rush on the Hampton Plains Estate lease. Another prospector and field manager, Captain Henry Fey, established the Feysville mine in 1896, and by 1897 the local progress association began to campaign for the town to be declared.

In the same year the town had a debating club and a cricket team and the first hotel was constructed in the town. The town was gazetted on 30 June 1898. The population of the town was 97 (90 males and 7 females) in 1898.

Land was set aside in 1919 for the development of a police station and court house but neither were ever built.

The locality was the terminus of the railway line from Lakeside to White Hope.
