= Lakewood, Western Australia =

Ghost town in Western Australia

Lakewood
- Town
- Coordinates: 30.808°S 121.534°E
- Country: Australia
- State: Western Australia
- LGA(s): City of Kalgoorlie-Boulder
- Location: 605 km (376 mi) ENE of Perth; 10 km (6.2 mi) SE of Kalgoorlie
- Established: 1904

Government
  - State electorate(s): Electoral district of Kalgoorlie
  - Federal division(s): O'Connor

Area
  - Total: 17 km^{2} (6.6 sq mi)
- Elevation: 331 m (1,086 ft)
- Postcode: 6431

Lakewood is a ghost town in Western Australia, located between Kalgoorlie and Kambalda in the Goldfields-Esperance region of Western Australia.

Originally the town was known as Lakeside and in 1903 the local progress association lobbied the government for residential lots to be surveyed. The name Lakeside was not considered, as a town in Queensland with the same name already existed. The name Gnumballa was considered by the Kalgoorlie Road Board but when the town was gazetted in 1904 it was originally named Ngumballa. The name is Aboriginal in origin and is the local name for Hannan Lake. The name of the railway station, on the Kalgoorlie to Gnumballa Lake railway line, remained as Lakeside and by 1909 the name of the town was also changed. Another station near Wiluna was named Lakeside in 1938 so the name of the town was once again changed, this time to Lakewood. The town was not officially renamed until 1947.

Timber railways for firewood in the goldfields, were linked to the locality in the early 20th century.
