= Boorara, Western Australia =

Boorara
- Town
- Coordinates: 30°48′00″S 121°38′00″E
- Country: Australia
- State: Western Australia
- LGA(s): City of Kalgoorlie-Boulder
- Location: 613 km (381 mi) east of Perth; 17 km (11 mi) south east of Kalgoorlie; 44 km (27 mi) north of Kambalda
- Established: 1897

Government
  - State electorate(s): Kalgoorlie
  - Federal division(s): O'Connor

Area
  - Total: 35.3 km^{2} (13.6 sq mi)
- Elevation: 394 m (1,293 ft)

Population
  - Total(s): 0 (SAL 2016)
- Postcode: 6431

Boorara is a small town in the Goldfields region of Western Australia.

The origin of the town's name is Aboriginal but the meaning of the word is unknown.

The townsite was gazetted in 1897.
