= Frederick Vosper =

Australian politician (1869–1901)

Frederick Charles Burleigh Vosper
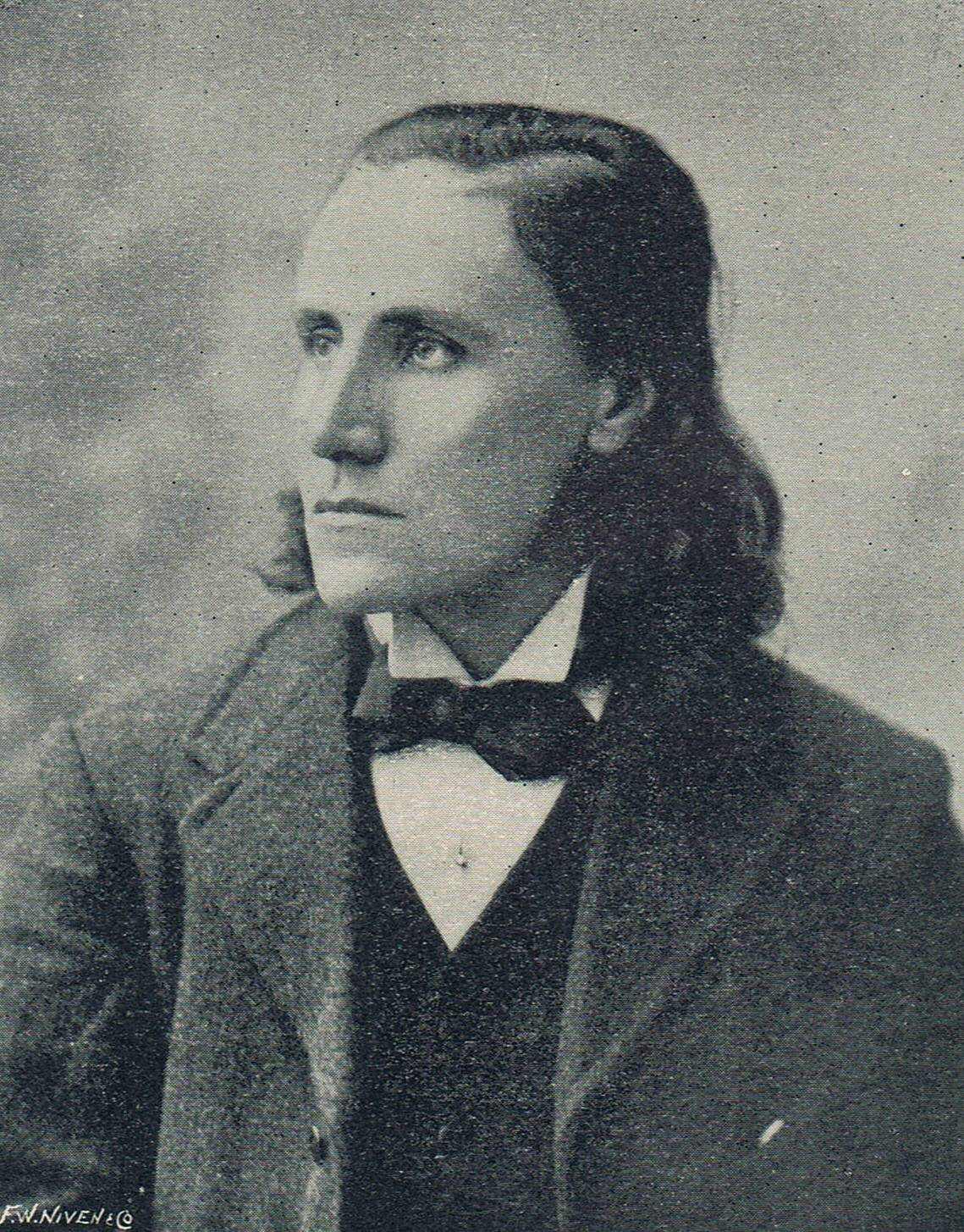

Member of the Western Australian Legislative Assembly
- In office 4 May 1897 – 1900
- Preceded by: New Seat
- Succeeded by: Seat Abolished
- Constituency: North-East Coolgardie

Personal details
- Born: 23 March 1869 St Dominick, Cornwall, England
- Died: 6 January 1901 (aged 31) Perth, Western Australia
- Party: Independent
- Occupation: Journalist and politician

Frederick Charles Burleigh Vosper (23 March 1869 – 6 January 1901) was an Australian newspaper journalist and proprietor, and politician. He was well known for his ardent views and support of Australian republicanism, federalism and trade unionism.

== Early life ==
The son of civil engineer Charles Watson Vosper, Frederic Vosper was born in St Dominick, United Kingdom, and educated at Truro. He emigrated to Bolivia at the age of 15. Few other details of his early life are available, but in 1885 he was at Devonport serving with the Royal Navy on the training ship Lion.

== Journalistic career ==
Early in 1886 Vosper emigrated to Australia, arriving in Maryborough, Queensland in the middle of the year. He worked as a timber miller, drover and miner, before taking a job as a journalist for the Eidsvold Reporter. He later became mining correspondent for Maryborough Chronicle and Colonist, before becoming sub-editor for the Northern Miner in Charters Towers. According to Jaggard (1979), Vosper was heavily influenced by the political opinions and journalistic style of the Northern Miner's owner and editor, Thadeus O'Kane. When O'Kane died in May 1890, Vosper became editor of the Australian Republican, the organ of the Australian Republican Association.

Vosper rapidly developed a reputation as a political firebrand and industrial agitator with a talent for journalism and public speaking. During the 1891 Australian shearers' strike he wrote an editorial entitled Bread or Blood in which he encouraged the strikers to resort to violence if peaceful means proved unsuccessful: "If your oppressors will not listen to reason let them feel cold lead and steel; as they have starved you, so do you shoot them." As a result, Vosper was charged with two counts of seditious libel, but acquitted. The following year he was imprisoned for three months for inciting a riot during a miners' strike. At this time Vosper ceased cutting his hair. According to Victor Courtney, "the legend is that when in gaol he received the usual prison crop and he vowed that he would never have his hair cut again."

A passionate supporter of trade unionism, Vosper became closely associated with the Labour movement, but was never a member of the Labor Party because he refused to take their pledge. On those grounds the Labor Party refused him endorsement for the Queensland elections of 1893, and Vosper then left the colony.

After working on Sydney and Melbourne newspapers for a short time, Vosper emigrated to Western Australia in 1892, just as the gold rushes were beginning. In 1893 he arrived in Cue at the invitation of Alexander Livingstone, editor of the Murchison Miner. He briefly worked for the Murchison Miner as well as several other newspapers including Miner's Right, before establishing himself as editor of the Coolgardie Miner. He used the paper to espouse his views on republicanism, Asian immigration and workers' rights. He also argued for electoral redistribution to give the goldfields a fairer representation in the Western Australian parliament. His successor as editor to the Coolgardie Miner was fellow Cornish Australian Harry Kneebone. During 1895 Vosper edited the Geraldton Express for three months while its regular editor John Drew defended a libel action, and shortly afterwards served briefly as correspondent for the London-based West Australian Review.

While in Perth he also set up a new newspaper, The Sunday Times, becoming editor after his partner Edward Ellis died in 1898. His parliamentary career as well as the newspaper's favourite issues included votes for women, a minimum wage, compulsory arbitration, penal reform, and reform of the Lunacy Act.

== Political career ==
Between 1894 and 1897, Vosper was the organiser and travelling spokesman for a number of political movements. In Coolgardie in December 1894, he established the Anti-Asiatic League, which aimed to maintain living standards by excluding "cheap coloured labour". In November 1895 he was spokesman for the National League, which agitated for increased political representation for the goldfields. He became a leading figure in the Gold Diggers' Union and the Goldfields Protection and Advancement League, and was founder and spokesperson for the Electoral Registration League, which sought to help remotely located miners to register to vote.

On 4 May 1897, Vosper was elected to the Western Australian Legislative Assembly in the seat of North-East Coolgardie as an independent. At the time he was well known throughout the Eastern Goldfields; according to Jaggard (1979), he was the most widely known public figure apart from the premier, John Forrest.

To take his seat in parliament, Vosper moved to Perth. On 11 November 1897 he married a widow named Venetia Ann Nicholson, and shortly afterwards he used her capital to establish The Sunday Times. He became its editor after his partner Edward Ellis died in 1898.

Vosper joined the Parliamentary Goldfields Party almost immediately after his election, agreeing to work for payment of members, restriction of Asian immigration, better electoral representation for the goldfields, reductions in tariffs and amendments of mining laws. In addition to working for these goals, Vosper also pushed for the construction of a railway between Esperance and Coolgardie, votes for women, and compulsory arbitration. From May 1898, Vosper pushed for an inquiry into mental health policy and the treatment of female patients at the Fremantle Lunatic Asylum. He became chairman of the select committee that was established in October 1900, whose findings resulted in the implementation of widespread reforms. In 1900 he was also instrumental in winning the insertion of a minimum wage clause into government contracts.

Vosper was a member of the 1899 select committee appointed to examine the terms under which Western Australia was invited to participate in the Federation of Australia. Although his sympathies were unquestionably in favour of federation, he became convinced of a number of flaws in the terms, and campaigned for a 'No' vote. He argued that Western Australia should federate, but only after securing a guarantee that an intercontinental railway would be built at the cost of transport infrastructure. He also objected to aspects of the Senate's powers, and to the creation of a high court.

Vosper is also implicated in what was in effect personal attacks on C. Y. O'Connor in the last years of his life, with criticisms of O'Connor and the Goldfields Water Supply Scheme. A subsequent government enquiry found no wrongdoing by O'Connor, but rather by an employee. Moreover, Vosper died 14 months before O'Connor's suicide, and O'Connor is recorded as a mourner and wreath contributor at Vosper's funeral.

== Death ==
In 1900, Vosper's seat was abolished in a redistribution, so he decided that he would stand for a seat in the Senate instead. He began an election campaign, but early in January 1901 he became acutely ill with appendicitis.

He died in Perth on 6 January, just five days after the 1 January 1901 Proclamation of the Commonwealth of Australia in Sydney, and was buried in the Roman Catholic section of Perth's Karrakatta Cemetery. He was thirty-one years old. According to Victor Courtney, "undoubtedly leadership of the Labour Party and Premiership of the country would have come his way in the course of political events had he lived."

== See also ==
- Australian republicanism
