= Waverley, Western Australia =

Ghost town in Western Australia

Waverley Western Australia
- Coordinates: 30.243°S 120.954°E
- Established: 1898
- Postcode(s): 6431
- Elevation: 443 m (1,453 ft)
- Location: 670 km (416 mi) ENE of Perth; 75 km (47 mi) NNW of Kalgoorlie
- LGA(s): City of Kalgoorlie-Boulder
- State electorate(s): Electoral district of Kalgoorlie
- Federal division(s): O'Connor

Waverley, or Siberia, is a ghost town located between Kalgoorlie and Leonora. It is on the Davyhurst to Ora Banda Road in the Goldfields-Esperance region of Western Australia and has formed part of Maduwongga territory.

Prospectors Billy Frost and Bob Bonner discovered gold in the area in late 1893, sparking a gold rush. The growing population necessitated the planning of a townsite, and lots were surveyed in 1898, initially intended to be named Siberia. However, the local progress association opted to name the town Waverley after a nearby mine. The town was officially gazetted as Waverley in 1898.

Some of the mines close to town include Siberia, Waverley, Mexico and the Pole leases.

In 1911 the Postmaster General raised concern about the duplication of town names in Australia, including Waverley. Alternative names such as Wongi (the name of a nearby soak) and Siberia. The locals preferred Siberia and the name was officially gazetted in 1914. The name comes from Siberia Tank, a water supply that is close to the town.

In 1924, two miners, Emery and MacLachlan, picked up on the continuation of a deep alluvial lead and obtained satisfactory results.

The last resident left town in 1954.
