= Loongana, Western Australia =

Railway town in Western Australia

Coordinates: 30°56′46″S 127°02′17″E

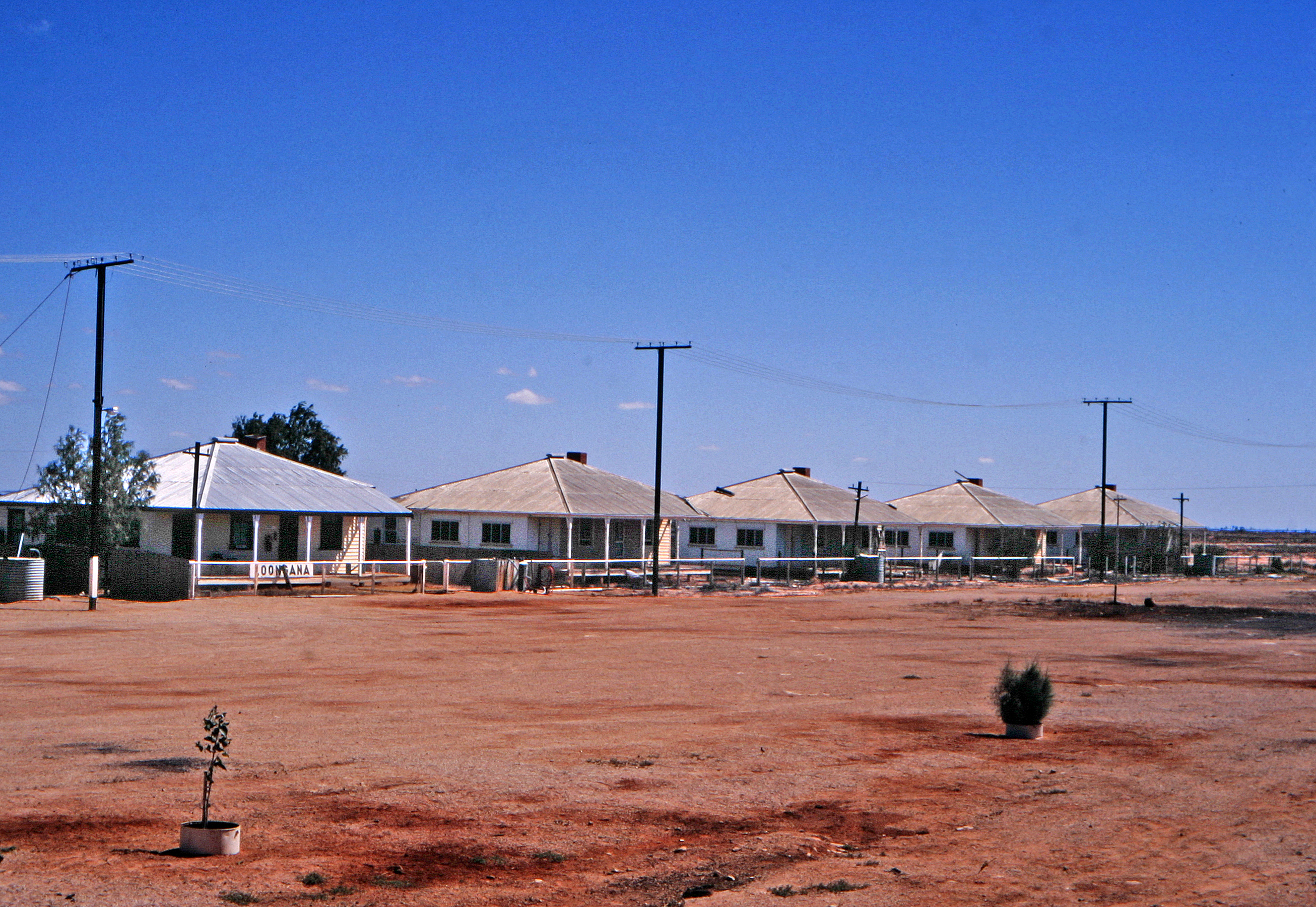
Employee houses in 2006

Loongana is a former railway town on the Nullarbor Plain in Western Australia.

It was built by the Commonwealth Railways to accommodate maintenance staff and their families on the Trans-Australian Railway that opened in 1917. The town was dependent on the Tea & Sugar for the delivery of supplies until 1996 when the train was withdrawn.

The area was formerly the site of a lime mine and processing plant.
