= Golden Ridge, Western Australia =

Abandoned town in Western Australia

Golden Ridge
- Town
- Coordinates: 30.85°S 121.65°E
- Country: Australia
- State: Western Australia
- LGA: City of Kalgoorlie-Boulder
- Location: 615 km (382 mi) east of Perth; 20 km (12 mi) south east of Kalgoorlie
- Established: 1911

Government
  - State electorate: Kalgoorlie
  - Federal division: O'Connor
- Postcode: 6430

Golden Ridge is an abandoned town in Western Australia located 615 kilometres (382 mi) east of Perth just off the Mount Monger Road in the Goldfields-Esperance region.

The town was originally designated as a business area through the mining act and was known as Waterfall. The government gazetted the town-site in 1910 following a request by the local progress committee to make more land available for residential development. It was initially named Waterfall, but the Commonwealth Government disagreed with the choice of name as another town with the same name already existed in New South Wales. The gazettal committee then chose the name Golden Ridge after the gold mine of the same name that lies adjacent to the town and officially the name in 1911.

The Trans-Australian Railway built a station in the town in 1913–1914. Golden Ridge is the second station east of Kalgoorlie between Parkeston and Curtin.
