= Windanya, Western Australia =

Ghost town in Western Australia

Windanya Western Australia
- Coordinates: 30.379°S 121.256°E
- Established: 1897
- Postcode(s): 6431
- Elevation: 431 m (1,414 ft)
- Location: 639 km (397 mi) ENE of Perth; 44 km (27 mi) NW of Kalgoorlie
- LGA(s): City of Kalgoorlie-Boulder
- State electorate(s): Electoral district of Kalgoorlie
- Federal division(s): O'Connor

Windanya is a ghost town located between Kalgoorlie and Leonora in the Goldfields–Esperance region of Western Australia.

During the mid-1890s gold was discovered in the area and the Australasia mine was established by 1897. Following an increase in population the townsite was gazetted in 1897.

The name was suggested by the surveyor H.S. King. It is the Aboriginal name for a place near Broad Arrow.
