= Mulgarrie, Western Australia =

Ghost town in Western Australia

Mulgarrie Western Australia
- Coordinates: 30.381°S 121.497°E
- Established: 1897
- Postcode(s): 6430
- Elevation: 365 m (1,198 ft)
- Location: 635 km (395 mi) ENE of Perth; 40 km (25 mi) north of Kalgoorlie
- LGA(s): City of Kalgoorlie-Boulder
- State electorate(s): Electoral district of Kalgoorlie
- Federal division(s): O'Connor

Mulgarrie is a ghost town, located between Kalgoorlie and Leonora in the Shire of Menzies in the Goldfields-Esperance region of Western Australia.

The locality was originally known as Hayes Find or Hit and Miss, and was reported upon in the 1890s. The area was visited by the surveyor Beasley in 1896, who suggested that a townsite was required. Lots were surveyed later the same year and the townsite was gazetted in 1897.
