= Kurnalpi, Western Australia =

Abandoned town in Western Australia

Kurnalpi
- Town
- Coordinates: 30.539°S 122.229°E
- Country: Australia
- State: Western Australia
- LGA(s): City of Kalgoorlie-Boulder
- Location: 671 km (417 mi) ENE of Perth; 80 km (50 mi) ENE of Kalgoorlie
- Established: 1895

Government
  - State electorate(s): Electoral district of Kalgoorlie
  - Federal division(s): O'Connor

Area
  - Total: 3,571.2 km^{2} (1,378.8 sq mi)
- Elevation: 377 m (1,237 ft)

Population
  - Total(s): 4 (SAL 2021)
- Postcode: 6431

Kurnalpi is an abandoned town in the Goldfields-Esperance region of Western Australia. It lies in what was once Maduwongga territory and is situated about 60 km north-east of Kalgoorlie.

In 1894 alluvial gold was discovered in the area sparking a rush to the area, a townsite being surveyed later the same year and gazetted in 1895. The post office was established in December 1894 and was upgraded to a Post and Telegraph Office in February 1896. In 1912, the postal arrangements were downgraded to an Administrative Office. Potable water was difficult to source in the area so several mobile water condensers were brought to town with three arriving in 1896, two more in 1897 and another in 1898. A police station was built in 1896 and closed in 1910. A coach travelled to Kalgoorlie twice a week from 1897. By 1901 the population of the town was 262 people (with 250 of them being male).

The name of the town is Aboriginal in origin but the meaning is unknown. A feature of the district on the edge of town is known as Kurnalpi Rockholes.
