= Parkeston, Western Australia =

Locality in Western Australia

Parkeston
- Suburb
- Interactive map of Parkeston
- Coordinates: 30.73077°S 121.48996°E
- Country: Australia
- State: Western Australia
- City: Kalgoorlie–Boulder
- LGA: City of Kalgoorlie–Boulder

Government
  - State electorate: Kalgoorlie
  - Federal division: O'Connor

Area
  - Total: 51.6 km^{2} (19.9 sq mi)

Population
  - Total: 5 (SAL 2021)
- Postcode: 6434

Parkeston is a suburb of the city of Kalgoorlie, Western Australia, located 3 kilometres (2 mi) east of the city centre. At the 2016 census, it had a population of 60, down from 69 in 2006. It contains the Ninga Mia Aboriginal community.

Parkeston was gazetted as a townsite in 1904. It was almost certainly named after Sir Henry Parkes, the "father of Australian Federation". (Note: The name was suggested in February 1901, a month after the federation of the Australian states. The Goldfields region was a strong supporter of federation, whereas much of the rest of Western Australia opposed it.)

== Railway ==
Parkeston is located near the western end of the Trans-Australian Railway. From 1917, the town was the interchange between the Western Australian Government Railways narrow gauge railway from Perth and the Commonwealth Railways' standard gauge railway to Port Augusta – a break of gauge that was not eliminated until 1970.

The elevation at the railway sidings is 375 metres.

== Camp ==
In 1919 Parkeston had a quarantine camp, due to passengers on trains from Adelaide being required to be quarantined. The internees produced a newspaper known as the Yellow Rag which had details of passengers and crew.

During and after World War II, Parkeston was the location of a small prisoner-of-war transit and detention camp, also known as the staging camp. It operated between June 1940 and March 1947 as a transit place for prisoners transiting across the country by rail, having a capacity of 20 internees in small cells.

== Aboriginal community ==
The Ninga Mia settlement was established in 1983, constructed by Aboriginal Hostels Limited as the Ninga Mia Fringe-Dweller Village. It was created as an Aboriginal Lands Trust Reserve and leased to the Ninga Mia Village Aboriginal Corporation. It was also used by visitors from remote Aboriginal communities in the Western Desert.

Ninga Mia contained around 30 houses as well as a management office, health clinic, communal kitchen and computer room. In 2004, it was described by Guardian writer David Fickling as a shantytown with many houses lacking basic facilities. A state government audit in 2018 found that no major refurbishments had been carried out since the 1980s and recommended that the community be closed; the Aboriginal corporation holding the village lease had been deregistered several years earlier. A number of homes were subsequently demolished and residents relocated. The Department of Communities described Ninga Mia as "a site of continued social dysfunction with no governance, declining, aged and no longer fit for purpose infrastructure, [and] no system of community governance". It reportedly budgeted for the relocation of 56 residents, although some inhabitants were opposed to the closure of the village.
