= Gudarra, Western Australia =

Abandoned town in Western Australia

Gudarra Western Australia
- Coordinates: 30.487°S 121.341°E
- Established: 1897
- Postcode(s): 6431
- Elevation: 381 m (1,250 ft)
- Location: 625 km (388 mi) ENE of Perth; 33 km (21 mi) NNW of Kalgoorlie; 4 km (2 mi) S of Broad Arrow
- LGA(s): City of Kalgoorlie-Boulder
- State electorate(s): Electoral district of Kalgoorlie
- Federal division(s): O'Connor

Gudarra is an abandoned town in the Goldfields-Esperance region of Western Australia. It is situated between Kalgoorlie and Menzies off the Goldfields Highway. The present-day Paddington Gold Mine is located near the old townsite.

Gold was initially discovered in the area in 1892, with the place first called the Sore Foot Rush, as a result of the limping prospectors who arrived on news of the discovery. The name of the town was later changed to Paddington and gazetted using that name on 4 February 1897. By 1911 the Commonwealth government was attempting to remove duplicated town names so the town was renamed and regazetted in 1912 as Gudarra. The town's name is Aboriginal in origin and its meaning is not known.

Deep leads were found in 1894, 1898 and 1901 and some of the mines that existed in the area were Paddington Consuls, Mt Corlic, Star of WA, and Pakeha. The Paddington Consuls mine was by far the largest and employed over 400 men at its peak until it went into liquidation in 1901. Paddington had its own municipality, the Municipality of Paddington from 1901 to 1903, which amalgamated with Broad Arrow to form the Municipality of Broad Arrow-Paddington until 1910.

A church was built in 1898 and the town boasted six hotels in 1898 with only one remaining by 1910. A police station and court were established in town in 1899 with the lock up possibly having come from Black Flag; the police quarters were delivered from Black Flag in 1900 with the stables being brought from Broad Arrow in 1901. The station was closed in 1910 with the detective office being moved to Boulder in 1911.

Gudarra, under the name of Paddington, was a stop on the Kalgoorlie to Leonora railway line but, while the railway line is still in operation, the town is now longer shown as a stop on contemporary maps.
