= Kanowna, Western Australia =

Ghost town in Western Australia

Kanowna
- Town
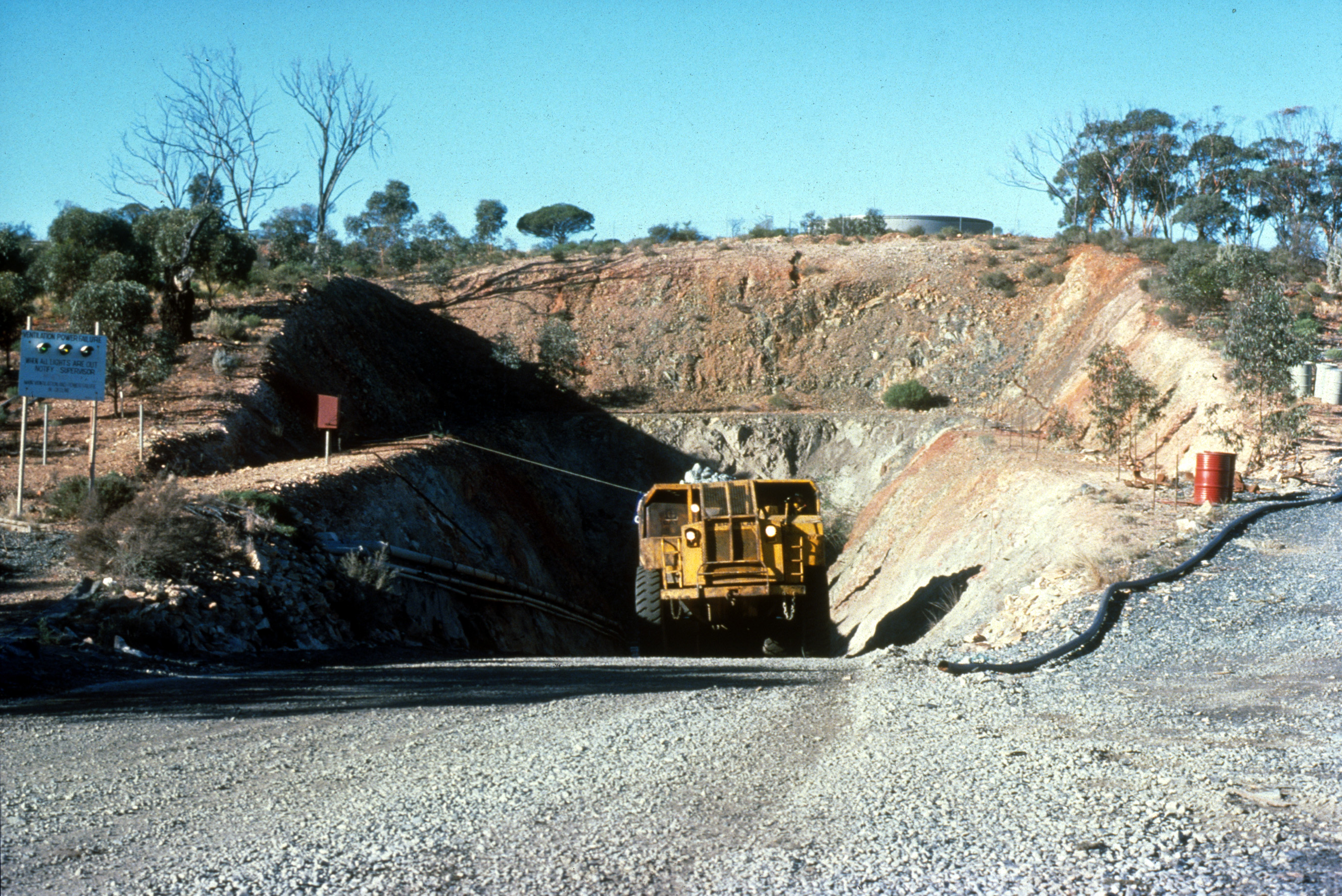
- The Silver Swan Nickel Mine, north-east of Kanowna, in 2003
- Coordinates: 30.61°S 121.60°E
- Country: Australia
- State: Western Australia
- LGA(s): Kalgoorlie-Boulder
- Location: 615 km (382 mi) east of Perth; 20 km (12 mi) NE of Kalgoorlie; 56 km (35 mi) NE of Coolgardie
- Established: 1894

Government
  - State electorate(s): Kalgoorlie
  - Federal division(s): O'Connor

Area
  - Total: 2,721.1 km^{2} (1,050.6 sq mi)
- Elevation: 377 m (1,237 ft)

Population
  - Total(s): 12 (SAL 2021)
- Postcode: 6431

Kanowna is a ghost town in the Goldfields region of Western Australia, about 20 kilometres (12 mi) east of Kalgoorlie. At the 2016 census, Kanowna had a population of 10 people.

After the discovery of gold in the area in 1893, the townsite was gazetted in 1894. and the population grew from 2,500 in 1897 to over 12,500 by 1899.

However, the alluvial gold supply was rapidly exhausted and underground mines following the outcropping vein produced decreasing amounts of gold, resulting in a slow but steady decrease in the population. The railway station, terminus of the Kalgoorlie to Kanowna railway line, was closed during the Great Depression, and by 1953 the town had been abandoned. The railway station platform, two cemeteries and mine workings are all that is left of the original town of Kanowna. Signs erected by the Eastern Goldfields Historical Society mark the sites of significant buildings.

Increasing gold prices in the late 1970s sparked renewed interest in exploring the geology of the area for new sources of gold. The discovery of a large amount of gold, previously undiscovered because the vein did not reach the surface, made gold mining in the region economically viable again. Mining recommenced in 1986, initially as open-cut mining, before moving to underground mines. As of 2002, the Kanowna Belle mine employed more than 300 people.

== See also ==
- Electoral district of Kanowna
