= Bulong, Western Australia =

Abandoned town in Western Australia

Bulong
- Town
- Coordinates: 30.74°S 121.79°E
- Country: Australia
- State: Western Australia
- LGA(s): City of Kalgoorlie-Boulder
- Location: 580 km (360 mi) east of Perth; 34 km (21 mi) east of Kalgoorlie
- Established: 1895

Government
  - State electorate(s): Eyre
  - Federal division(s): O'Connor

Area
  - Total: 1,980 km^{2} (760 sq mi)
- Elevation: 431 m (1,414 ft)

Population
  - Total(s): 0 (SAL 2016)
- Postcode: 6431

Bulong is an abandoned town in Western Australia located 580 kilometres (360 mi) east of Perth in the Goldfields-Esperance region of Western Australia.

In 1893 a group of prospectors, Hogan, Henry, Holmes, Kennedy and Turnbull, discovered gold on a lease they were granted called IOU.

A surveyor named G. Hamilton was given instructions to design the town layout in 1894, which was to be named IOU. Hamilton suggested the name be changed to the Indigenous Australian name of a nearby spring called Bulong.

The townsite was gazetted in 1895.

On the back of gold mining the population of the town grew to 620 by 1900, and it boasted large number of businesses including several hotels, bakeries, accountants, butchers and stores. The town also had a hospital, school, police station, telegraph station and post office. The town's water supply was obtained from Lake Yindarlagooda, condensed on the lake's banks then pumped to the top of Mount Stuart to gravity feed to the town. It had its own newspaper, the Bulong Bulletin, from 1897 to 1898. Hotels included the Bulong Hotel (on the corner of Reid and Colin Streets), the Court Hotel, Globe Hotel and Grand Hotel. Bulong Post Office opened on 2 January 1896, was downgraded to a receiving office on 1 July 1921 and again to a telephone office on 1 October 1924, and closed on 30 August 1956.

A nickel mine and processing plan, the Bulong Nickel Mine, operated near the old town site and was sold to Lionore in 2005. Lionore planned to upgrade the plant to process 10,000 tonnes of ore per year but were also investigating using water based technology to process 40,000 tonnes per year.

Bulong had its own local government at its height: the Municipality of Bulong existed from 1896 to 1909 and the Bulong Road District from 1899 to 1911.
