= Black Flag, Western Australia =

Abandoned town in Western Australia

Black Flag
- Town
- Coordinates: 30°33′S 121°14′E
- Country: Australia
- State: Western Australia
- LGA: City of Kalgoorlie-Boulder
- Location: 625 km (388 mi) ENE of Perth; 30 km (19 mi) NW of Kalgoorlie
- Established: 1897

Government
  - State electorate: Electoral district of Kalgoorlie
  - Federal division: O'Connor
- Elevation: 443 m (1,453 ft)
- Postcode: 6431

Black Flag is an abandoned town in Western Australia, 30 km north west of Kalgoorlie. It is on the Black Flag to Ora Banda Road in the Goldfields-Esperance region of Western Australia.

The town derives its name from the Black Flag gold find that was discovered in 1893 when a prospector, R.H Henning, pegged the lease. The mine was producing and attracting more miners to the area in 1894, and the town was gazetted in 1897. A condenser was built in 1895 to produce drinking water for the towns population. John Forrest visited the town in the same year during his 1,600-kilometre (994 mi) tour through the goldfields.

A police station and a racecourse had been established in the town in 1896 and at the town's peak over eight hotels, a bakery, a bank and numerous other businesses were operating.

The population of the town was 313 (260 males and 53 females) in 1898.

The two biggest mines in town, Black Flag and Ladee Bountiful, closed down between 1906 and 1907 and the town was abandoned shortly afterwards.

The name of the town is thought to originate from a flag that had been hung up to indicate that a store was open for business. However, Norman Sligo, in his book Mates and Gold, suggests that the name was because of the "hills and flats being coated with black ironstone wash".

The remains of the townsite are within the Credo Station leasehold.
