= Bardoc, Western Australia =

Abandoned town in Western Australia

Bardoc Western Australia
- Coordinates: 30.335°S 121.294°E
- Established: 1896
- Postcode(s): 6431
- Elevation: 433 m (1,421 ft)
- Location: 643 km (400 mi) ENE of Perth; 48 km (30 mi) NNW of Kalgoorlie
- LGA(s): City of Kalgoorlie-Boulder
- State electorate(s): Electoral district of Kalgoorlie
- Federal division(s): O'Connor

Bardoc is an abandoned town in the Goldfields-Esperance region of Western Australia. It is situated between Kalgoorlie and Menzies along the Goldfields Highway.

The town's name is Aboriginal in origin and is taken from a hill close to town. The word barduk means near or close in the local dialect. The town was gazetted on 3 June 1896. Alluvial gold was first discovered in the area in 1894, and by 1895 over 400 men were working the area.

Some of the mines that were operating in the area included Zoroastrian, Excelsior and Wycheproof. A telegraph line was established in 1896 and four hotels were known to be open in town. More gold deposits were found in 1896 particularly at the Mount Eva and neighbouring The Australian leases, which were described to have "stone hat exceeds the richness of anything stuck so far in Bardoc". Parcels of ore were being sent to the Mount Burgess battery for treatment.

A police station was constructed by 1897, and in 1898 a coach service to Kalgoorlie was running three times a week.

The population of the town was 206 (170 males and 36 females) in 1898.

The area had received good rainfall and had abundant herbage on the ground in 1900. A 10-head stamp mill was being constructed at the Zoroastrian mine in the same year. A crushing plant at the Nerrin Nerrin mine, which was open for public crushing, and a 20 head mill was in action of the Excelsior lease about 5 miles north of the town.

Bardoc was a stop on the Kalgoorlie to Leonora railway line but, while the railway line is still in operation, the town is now longer shown as a stop on contemporary maps.

By 1908 no mines were in operation and the town was effectively deserted.

A drought hit the area over 1911 causing further hindrance to mining. A petition was submitted to extend the branch pipeline from the Goldfields Water Scheme later the same year. The plan was to extend the line to Ora Banda via Bardoc and Broad Arrow.

The police station was closed the same year and eventually relocated to Westonia in 1914.

The area was flooded following heavy rains with the few remaining residents receiving provision from Broad Arrow and fuel being available a Vetters Station.
