= List of State Register of Heritage Places in the City of Kalgoorlie–Boulder =

The State Register of Heritage Places is maintained by the Heritage Council of Western Australia. As of 2026, 387 places are heritage-listed in the City of Kalgoorlie–Boulder, of which 64 are on the State Register of Heritage Places.

== List ==
The Western Australian State Register of Heritage Places, as of 2026, lists the following 64 state registered places within the City of Kalgoorlie–Boulder:

Place name	Place #	Street number	Street name	Suburb or town	Co-ordinates	Notes & former names	Photo
Masonic Temple	175	134	Burt Street	Boulder	30.782238°S 121.484801°E	Masonic Hall	
Boulder Court House (former)	179	72	Burt Street	Boulder	30.782137°S 121.487961°E	Court House	
Boulder Town Hall & Offices	184	118–120	Burt Street	Boulder	30.78224°S 121.48668°E		
Rosewood House	190	49	Moran Street	Boulder	30.780287°S 121.485326°E	St Joseph's Convent	
District Education Office	196	23–27	Federal Street	South Kalgoorlie	30.761107°S 121.487815°E	Eastern Goldfields Senior High School, Kalgoorlie Secondary School	
Cornwall Hotel	201	25	Hopkins Street	South Boulder	30.788857°S 121.495333°E		
Boulder Primary School	203	200	Lane Street	Boulder	30.780037°S 121.487532°E	Greater Boulder School, Boulder City School, Boulder Central School, Central Primary Sch	
Boulder Police Station (former)	209		Piesse Street	Boulder	30.782850°S 121.488371°E	Transport Centre, East Goldfields Vol Task force, Police Quarters and Lock-Up	
Queen's Methodist Church, Boulder	210	36–38	Piesse Street	Boulder	30.783461°S 121.489951°E	Residences (Units) 36–38 Piesse Street	
Kalgoorlie School of the Air	212	253	Piesse Street	Boulder	30.782736°S 121.486798°E	Boulder Tech School, Boulder High School, Goldfieds Special Educ Centre (Lorna Mitchell Scl)	
Hannan's Club	1266	46	Brookman Street	Kalgoorlie	30.745097°S 121.472381°E		
St Mary's Roman Catholic Church	1267	24	Brookman Street	Kalgoorlie	30.743713°S 121.4739°E	and original church site	
Original Roman Catholic Church site	1268	Corner	Brookman & Porter Streets	Kalgoorlie	30.741485°S 121.475933°E		
Hammond Park Rotunda	1269		Memorial Drive	Kalgoorlie	30.74161°S 121.453216°E	Victoria Park Rotunda	
Offices and Dental Surgery	1270	45–47	Dugan Street	Kalgoorlie	30.74555°S 121.471102°E	Residences, 45 & 47 Dugan Street	
Kalgoorlie Primary School	1272	24	Dugan Street	Kalgoorlie	30.745272°S 121.470186°E		
Chamber of Mines Building	1273	115–145	Egan Street	Kalgoorlie	30.748382°S 121.474645°E	Museum, includes School of Mines and Mines	
Masonic Lodge	1275	26	Egan Street	Kalgoorlie	30.744907°S 121.476962°E		
Railway Institute, Kalgoorlie	1278	81	Forrest Street	Kalgoorlie	30.747822°S 121.466593°E		
Kalgoorlie Railway Station	1279		Forrest Street	Kalgoorlie	30.746°S 121.4669°E		
District Superintendent's House (former)	1280	2	Forrest Street	Kalgoorlie	30.743566°S 121.470018°E	District Engineer's Residence	
Paddy Hannan's Statue, Town Hall	1282	316	Hannan Street	Kalgoorlie	30.748795°S 121.470679°E		
Western Australian Bank (former), Kalgoorlie	1284	106	Hannan Street	Kalgoorlie	30.744959°S 121.474617°E	Ministry of Housing Regional Office, Bank of New South Wales – (NSW)	
Cohn's Buildings & Tattersall's Hotel (former)	1286	63–71	Hannan Street	Kalgoorlie	30.745046°S 121.475825°E	Cohn's Buildings, Savoy Hotel, Great Western Hotel	
Exchange Hotel, Kalgoorlie	1289	135	Hannan Street	Kalgoorlie	30.746051°S 121.474732°E		
Government Buildings, Kalgoorlie	1291	208–222	Hannan Street	Kalgoorlie	30.746547°S 121.472874°E	Registrars Office, Kalgoorlie Post/Telegraph Office, Wardens Court	
Kalgoorlie Miner Building	1292	119–127	Hannan Street	Kalgoorlie	30.745903°S 121.474894°E	Miner & Western Argus Offices	
McKenzie's Buildings	1295	140–144	Hannan Street	Kalgoorlie	30.746133°S 121.473328°E		
Mechanics' Institute (former)	1296	202	Hannan Street	Kalgoorlie	30.745864°S 121.473624°E	Home Building Society, Kalgoorlie Miners' Institute	
City Markets	1297	272–280	Hannan Street	Kalgoorlie	30.747906°S 121.471383°E		
Park Buildings	1299	139–147	Hannan Street	Kalgoorlie	30.746557°S 121.474166°E	Windsor Chambers, Hannans Chambers, Kalgoorlie Diamonds, Hot Spot Burger bar	
Shop	1301	260	Hannan Street	Kalgoorlie	30.747708°S 121.4716°E		
Endowment Block, Kalgoorlie	1302	250-316	Hannan Street	Kalgoorlie	30.748178°S 121.471171°E		
Semaphore Chambers	1303	77–79	Hannan Street	Kalgoorlie	30.745161°S 121.475585°E		
Kalgoorlie Town Hall & Council Chambers	1306	316	Hannan Street	Kalgoorlie	30.748696°S 121.470515°E	HMAS Kalgoorlie Memorial, 16th Battalion Memorial	
York Hotel	1307	259	Hannan Street	Kalgoorlie	30.74828°S 121.47204°E		
Christian Brothers College (former) Kalgoorlie	1310	103	MacDonald Street	Kalgoorlie	30.751383°S 121.472752°E	Curtin University of Technology Williams Hous	
Commonwealth Health Laboratory (former)	1313	31	Maritana Street	Kalgoorlie	30.74204°S 121.470176°E	Eastern Goldfields Medical Division of Genera, WA Centre for Remote & Rural Medicine	
North Kalgoorlie Primary School	1320	80–84	Campbell Street	Lamington	30.738513°S 121.460011°E		
British Arms Hotel (former)	1321	13–19	Hannan Street, 22 Outridge Terrace	Kalgoorlie	30.74389°S 121.477776°E	Golden Mile Museum	
Trades Hall	1325	30	Porter Street	Kalgoorlie	30.746219°S 121.477418°E		
Kalgoorlie Racecourse and Buildings	1326		Meldrum Avenue	Kalgoorlie	30.76214°S 121.468002°E		
King Battery	3311	47 km SSE of	Kalgoorlie, White Hope Mine access road via Wollubar Station	Kambalda	31.076483°S 121.641594°E		
The Palms	3427	68	Piccadilly Street	Kalgoorlie	30.740532°S 121.468355°E		
Cremorne Theatre (former)	3468	46	Hannan Street	Kalgoorlie	30.743527°S 121.476192°E		
Lord Forrest Olympic Pool	3511		MacDonald Street	Kalgoorlie	30.750192°S 121.474479°E	Lord Forrest Youth Facility	
Station Masters House (former), Kalgoorlie	3791	14	Forrest Street	Kalgoorlie	30.747031°S 121.466182°E	12–14 Forrest Street, Forrest Houses	
Railway Worker's Cottage	3792	22	Forrest Street	Kalgoorlie	30.747625°S 121.465426°E	22 Forrest Street: Plate Layer's Cottage, Per Way Cottage	
Boulder Railway Station, Subway & Loopline	4639		Hamilton Street	Boulder	30.7827°S 121.4923°E		
North Kalgoorlie Fire Station	7508	1	Hare Street	Kalgoorlie	30.736224°S 121.465904°E	Lamington Fire Station	
Railway House	15718	3	Wittenoom Street	Kalgoorlie	30.743063°S 121.469358°E	Part of Wittenoom Street Railway Houses (15865)	
Rawlinna Townsite	15722		378 km West of Kalgoorlie on Trans Australian Railway	Rawlinna	31.008931°S 125.330729°E		
Mount Charlotte Reservoir	15727		Sutherland Street	Kalgoorlie	30.733333°S 121.483333°E		
Railway Water Tower, Broad Arrow	15828		Railway Street	Broad Arrow	30.448856°S 121.328904°E		
The Kalgoorlie Club	15840	108–110	Egan Street	Kalgoorlie	30.747125°S 121.474325°E	The Kalgoorlie Country Club	
Wittenoom Street Railway Houses	15865	1–5	Wittenoom Street	Piccadilly	30.743063°S 121.469358°E		
Kalgoorlie Railway Housing Group	15867	44–46	Wittenoom Street	Piccadilly	30.747702°S 121.462619°E	Piccadilly House, Trainmen's Barracks	
Goldfields Water Supply Scheme	16610			Listed under the Coolgardie, Cunderdin, Kellerberrin, Kalgoorlie–Boulder, Merredin, Mundaring, Northam, Tammin and Yilgarn State Heritage lists		Stretches from Mundaring Weir in Perth to the Eastern Goldfields, particularly Coolgardie and Kalgoorlie	
Boulder CWA Hall	16652		Hamilton Street	Boulder	30.78171°S 121.49245°E		
Curtin University of Technology (School of Mines)	24919	117–145	Egan Street	Kalgoorlie	30.748382°S 121.474645°E		
Curtin University of Technology (School of Mines Museum)	24920	117–145	Egan Street	Kalgoorlie	30.748382°S 121.474645°E		
Boulder Subway Bridge	24921	Lot 3603	Burt Street	Boulder	30.78146°S 121.491508°E	Subway Bridge	
Chamber of Mines Building	24924	115	Egan Street	Kalgoorlie	30.748382°S 121.474645°E		
Red Post Boxes Group	25501			Kalgoorlie, Busselton, Bassendean			
