= List of State Register of Heritage Places in the Shire of Northam =

The State Register of Heritage Places is maintained by the Heritage Council of Western Australia. As of 2026, 166 places are heritage-listed in the Shire of Northam,^{[N1]} of which 40 are on the State Register of Heritage Places.^{[N2]}

== List ==
The Western Australian State Register of Heritage Places, as of 2026, lists the following 40 state registered places within the Shire of Northam:

Place name	Place #	Street number	Street name	Suburb or town	Co-ordinates	Notes & former names	Photo
Morby Farm Cottage, Northam	1837	70	Katrine Road	Northam	31.638058°S 116.676008°E		
Buckland Homestead and Farm Buildings	1843		Buckland Road	Irishtown, Northam	31.565005°S 116.618522°E		
Northam Fire Station No 2 & Quarters (former)	1852	87	Duke Street	Northam	31.656136°S 116.673246°E	Northam's Avon Descent Assoc. Headquarters	
Colonial Tavern & Stables, Northam	1855	197	Duke Street West	Northam	31.66303°S 116.665715°E	McCarthey's Hotel, Club Tavern, Club Hotel, Duke's Inn	
Old Methodist Church & Hall (former)	1856	103	Duke Street East	Northam	31.657178°S 116.672325°E	Uniting Church, Methodist Church	
Northam Railway Station (former)	1859	401	Fitzgerald Street	Northam	31.660893°S 116.662742°E	Northam Railway Museum	
ANZ Bank, Northam	1861	133	Fitzgerald Street	Northam	31.652589°S 116.673144°E	Union Bank	
Shamrock Hotel, Northam	1865	110	Fitzgerald Street	Northam	31.651924°S 116.672995°E	Riley's Bar, The Farmer's Home Hotel	
Northam Post Office & Quarters	1867	239-243	Fitzgerald Street	Northam	31.6551°S 116.6703°E		
Northam Municipal Chambers site	1869		Fitzgerald Street	Northam	^{[?]}	Demolished in 1981	
Commonwealth Bank, Northam	1871	181	Fitzgerald Street	Northam	31.653967°S 116.671656°E		
Bank of New South Wales (NSW) (former), Northam	1872	161	Fitzgerald Street	Northam	31.653593°S 116.67205°E	Westpac Bank, Challenge Bank, Western Australian Bank (former)	
Fermoy House (former), Northam	1874	1	Lance Street	Northam	31.657749°S 116.678331°E	Throssell Homestead, St Joseph's Marist Brothers School	
Uralia	1876	59	Gordon Street	Northam	31.657872°S 116.67357°E	St John of God Hospital, Rosalyn	
Northam Town Hall/Lesser Hall	1877		Wellington Street	Northam	31.656213°S 116.671634°E		
Byfield House	1878	30	Gordon Street	Northam	31.659233°S 116.677005°E		
The Residency	1880	60	Habgood Street	Northam	31.66682°S 116.665349°E	The Magistrate's Residence (former), The Old Resident Magistrate's Home	
Northam State School (former)	1881	33	Wellington Street	Northam	31.651925°S 116.675101°E	Avon Valley Arts Centre Workshop, Northam Primary School, Old Girls School (former)	
Mitchell House	1882	15-17	Hawes Street	Northam	31.652257°S 116.676692°E	Bona Vista	
Northam Senior High School	1883	30	Kennedy Street	Northam	31.647025°S 116.668159°E		
John Morrell's Grave	1885		Goomalling Road	Northam	31.639867°S 116.679629°E		
Northam Police Station and Court House	1890	114	Wellington Street East	Northam	31.656951°S 116.669191°E		
St John's Anglican Church & Parish Hall, Northam	1891	11	Wellington Street	Northam	31.6507°S 116.675585°E		
Northam Post Office (former)	1892	33	Wellington Street	Northam	31.652413°S 116.674760°E	Avon Valley Arts Centre, Old Post Office	
Northam Police Station	1896	297	Fitzgerald Street East	Northam	31.656951°S 116.669191°E		
Railway Institute, Northam	1898	182	Wellington Street West	Northam	31.660693°S 116.665076°E	WA Govt Railways & Tramways Institute	
Bardeen	3414	866	Dumbarton Road	Irishtown	31.58699°S 116.604011°E		
Poole Street Footbridge	3549		Poole Street	Northam	31.659984°S 116.658577°E	West Northam Footbridge	
Northam Cemetery	3976		Katrine Road	Northam	31.636405°S 116.657887°E	Hubert Bartlett-Day's Tree, Pioneer Cemetery, Little Pansy's Tree Northam Cemetery	
Northam Army Camp	6126		Great Eastern Highway	Burlong	31.672807°S 116.62075°E	Department of Immigration AccommodationCentre	
Chauncy's Cairn	8565	North of	Cobb Road	Woottating	31.896422°S 116.370776°E		
Curdnatta	10881	22	Newcastle Road	Northam	31.652913°S 116.664496°E		
Town Council Offices (former) & Library, Northam	10907	298	Fitzgerald Street East	Northam	31.65587°S 116.668193°E	Northam Library	
Clackline Bridge	10910		Lockyer Road	Clackline	31.7206°S 116.522°E	Viaduct	
Hoopers Winery & Surroundings	10917	9	Yates Street	Bakers Hill	31.746202°S 116.455451°E	Mount Baker Estate, Keanes Vineyards	
National Australia Bank, Northam	14788	141	Fitzgerald Street	Northam	31.652988°S 116.672715°E		
Uniting Church & Hall, Northam	16300	103	Duke Street East	Northam	31.657178°S 116.672325°E	Methodist Church & Hall	
Goldfields Water Supply Scheme	16610			Listed under the Coolgardie, Cunderdin, Kellerberrin, Kalgoorlie–Boulder, Merredin, Mundaring, Northam, Tammin and Yilgarn State Heritage lists		Stretches from Mundaring Weir in Perth to the Eastern Goldfields, particularly Coolgardie and Kalgoorlie	
Police Station (former)	24983	128	Wellington Street	Northam	31.65744°S 116.669107°E	Community Centre Old Police Station Police	
Northam Courthouse	25062	114	Wellington Street	Northam	31.657066°S 116.669457°E		

== Notes ==
- ^[N1] A search for Northam LGA returns 392 hits, of which 223 are for the Northampton LGA, 166 are for Northam LGA while five are multi-region entries
- ^[N2] A search for Northam LGA returns 70 hits, of which 30 are for the Northampton LGA and 40 for Northam LGA
- ^[?] No coordinates specified by Inherit database
