= Lamington (disambiguation) =

A Lamington is a type of sponge or butter cake.

Lamington may also refer to:

== Places ==
In Australia:

- Lamington, Queensland, a locality in the Scenic Rim Region
- Lamington National Park, in Queensland
- Lamington Bridge, in Queensland
- Lamington, Western Australia and West Lamington, Western Australia, two settlements in Kalgoorlie, Western Australia

In New Jersey:

- Lamington, New Jersey, an unincorporated area within Bedminster Township
- Lamington River, a tributary of the North Branch Raritan River

In Scotland:

- Lamington, Aberdeenshire
- Lamington, Highland
- Lamington, South Lanarkshire
- Lamington Hill, South Lanarkshire

Elsewhere:

- Lamington Road, an electronic goods market in Mumbai, India
- Mount Lamington, a volcano in the Oro Province of Papua New Guinea

== Other ==
- Baron Lamington, a British peerage title
