= List of State Register of Heritage Places in the Shire of Coolgardie =

The State Register of Heritage Places is maintained by the Heritage Council of Western Australia. As of 2026, 161 places are heritage-listed in the Shire of Coolgardie, of which 27 are on the State Register of Heritage Places.

== List ==
The Western Australian State Register of Heritage Places, as of 2026, lists the following 27 state registered places within the Shire of Coolgardie:

Place name	Place #	Street number	Street name	Suburb or town	Co-ordinates	Notes & former names	Photo
Gnarlbine Soaks (Well No.22)	556		Victoria Rock Road 30 km south-west of Coolgardie	Coolgardie	31.147241°S 120.959678°E	Gnarlbine Well (Well No.22)	
State Battery, Coolgardie	557		Battery Road	Coolgardie	30.959992°S 121.179207°E		
Original Pioneer Cemetery	558		Forrest Street	Coolgardie	30.949736°S 121.15474°E		
New Coolgardie Pioneer Cemetery	559		Great Eastern Highway	Coolgardie	30.950792°S 121.144592°E		
Marvel Bar Hotel (former), Coolgardie	562	33 & 33A	Bayley Street	Coolgardie	30.954999°S 121.168756°E	Marvel Loch Hotel, RSL Building	
Row of 3 Shops & Lodge	566	77	Bayley Street	Coolgardie	30.955107°S 121.162837°E		
Warden's Court (former)	568	61	Sylvester Street	Coolgardie	30.953998°S 121.164552°E	Government Building	
Coolgardie Post Office & Associated Buildings	569	56-60	Bayley Street	Coolgardie	30.95428°S 121.165394°E	Gaol, Police Station and Warden's Court, Post Office	
Railway Hotel (former), Coolgardie	570	75-77	Bayley Street	Coolgardie	30.955077°S 121.162942°E	Gold Rush Lodge, Railway Lodge, Ghost Inn Hotel, Michelle Lodge	
St Anthony's Convent of Mercy (former)	573	85-93	Lindsay Street	Coolgardie	30.952483°S 121.161571°E	Convent School	
Convent School (former)	574	87	Lindsay Street	Coolgardie	30.952483°S 121.161781°E	Theatre Royal (former)	
House & Trees (former Warden Finnerty's House)	577	2	McKenzie Street	Coolgardie	30.958616°S 121.16704°E		
Coolgardie Primary School	579	Corner	Hunt & Shaw Streets	Coolgardie	30.950146°S 121.166593°E		
Coolgardie Railway Station and Goods Shed	581	75	Woodward Street	Coolgardie	30.956437°S 121.162434°E	Railway Station (former), Museum	
Old Pumping Station	583		Great Eastern Highway	Wallaroo	31.092729°S 120.693253°E	No 8 Pumping Station, Dedari (Benari)	
Coolgardie Fire Station	1340		Sylvester Street	Coolgardie	30.952962°S 121.164519°E		
Peter Pan	1737	69-71	Forrest Street	Coolgardie	30.949941°S 121.163989°E	Leighton House	
Toorak Hill, Goldfields Water Supply Reservoir	3660		Moran Street	Coolgardie	30.939130°S 121.164493°E	Toorak Tank, Part of Goldfields Water Supply Scheme precinct (16610)	
Mines Office	3661		Bayley Street	Coolgardie	30.953998°S 121.164552°E	Part of Warden's Court precinct (568)	
Bank	3662		Bayley Street	Coolgardie	30.953998°S 121.164552°E	Part of Warden's Court precinct (568)	
Museum - Ben Prior's	3663	55-59	Bayley Street	Coolgardie	30.955076°S 121.165332°E	Part of Warden's Court precinct (568)	
Coolgardie Bowling Pavilion	3664	Corner	Sylvester & Lefroy Streets	Coolgardie	30.953684°S 121.162915°E	Exhibition stand	
Coolgardie Drill Hall	3665		Bayley Street	Coolgardie	30.953998°S 121.164552°E	Part of Warden's Court precinct (568)	
Bullabulling Rock Water Catchment and Dams	3933		Reserve 2919	Bullabulling	31.01147°S 120.876655°E		
Woolgangie Catchment, Reservoirs and Railway Settlement (ruin)	3934		Great Eastern Highway	Woolgangie	31.163409°S 120.551856°E	Woolgangie Catchment and Dam	
Coolgardie Sub-Branch RSL Memorial, RSL Hall	15696		Bayley Street	Coolgardie	30.954999°S 121.168756°E	Part of Marvel Bar Hotel precinct (562)	
Goldfields Water Supply Scheme	16610			Listed under the Coolgardie, Cunderdin, Kellerberrin, Kalgoorlie–Boulder, Merredin, Mundaring, Northam, Tammin and Yilgarn State Heritage lists		Stretches from Mundaring Weir in Perth to the Eastern Goldfields, particularly Coolgardie and Kalgoorlie	
