= List of State Register of Heritage Places in the Shire of Kellerberrin =

List of heritage sites in Western Australia

The State Register of Heritage Places is maintained by the Heritage Council of Western Australia. As of 2026, 57 places are heritage-listed in the Shire of Kellerberrin, of which six are on the State Register of Heritage Places.

== List ==
The Western Australian State Register of Heritage Places, as of 2026, lists the following six state registered places within the Shire of Kellerberrin:

Place name	Place #	Street number	Street name	Suburb or town	Co-ordinates	Notes & former names	Photo
Agricultural Hall (former), Kellerberrin	1369	Corner	Leake & Bedford Street	Kellerberrin	31.632163°S 117.720883°E	District Museum, Kellerberrin Folk Museum	
Kellerberrin Post Office & Residence	1372	58	Massingham Street	Kellerberrin	31.634064°S 117.718689°E		
Kellerberrin Fire Station	1379	4	Ripper Street	Kellerberrin	31.6342°S 117.72198°E		
Hillview House Group	4045	124	Massingham Street	Kellerberrin	31.635071°S 117.709834°E		
Djuringe Mooranoppin, Kellerberrin	11888	Corner	Goldfields & Mission Roads	Kellerberrin	31.5941°S 117.7725°E	Djuringe Aboriginal Mission and Reserve (former), Old Jiriny Mission, Woolundra Aboriginal Mission	
Goldfields Water Supply Scheme	16610			Listed under the Coolgardie, Cunderdin, Kellerberrin, Kalgoorlie–Boulder, Merredin, Mundaring, Northam, Tammin and Yilgarn State Heritage lists		Stretches from Mundaring Weir in Perth to the Eastern Goldfields, particularly Coolgardie and Kalgoorlie	
