= List of State Register of Heritage Places in the Shire of Cunderdin =

List of heritage sites in Western Australia

The State Register of Heritage Places is maintained by the Heritage Council of Western Australia. As of 2026, 29 places are heritage-listed in the Shire of Cunderdin, of which five are on the State Register of Heritage Places.

== List ==
The Western Australian State Register of Heritage Places, as of 2026, lists the following five state registered places within the Shire of Cunderdin:

Place name	Place #	Street number	Street name	Suburb or town	Co-ordinates	Notes & former names	Photo
Railway Water Tower, Cunderdin	647	Lot 2	Forrest Street	Cunderdin	31.6516°S 117.241458°E		
No 3 Pumping Station	649		Forrest Street	Cunderdin	31.652167°S 117.241848°E	Cunderdin Museum Part of the Goldfields Water Supply Scheme precinct (16610)	
Cunderdin Hall	654		Main Street	Cunderdin	31.650938°S 117.240161°E		
Cunderdin Airfield	4570	82	Aerodrome Road	Cunderdin	31.620183°S 117.220757°E	Bellman Hangar and associated Buildings, RAAF Station (former)	
Goldfields Water Supply Scheme	16610			Listed under the Coolgardie, Cunderdin, Kellerberrin, Kalgoorlie–Boulder, Merredin, Mundaring, Northam, Tammin and Yilgarn State Heritage lists		Stretches from Mundaring Weir in Perth to the Eastern Goldfields, particularly Coolgardie and Kalgoorlie	
