= Hannans, Western Australia =

Hannans
- Suburb
- Coordinates: 30.71934°S 121.45402°E
- Country: Australia
- State: Western Australia
- City: Kalgoorlie–Boulder
- LGA(s): City of Kalgoorlie–Boulder

Government
  - State electorate(s): Kalgoorlie
  - Federal division(s): O'Connor

Area
  - Total: 4 km^{2} (1.5 sq mi)

Population
  - Total(s): 2,410 (SAL 2021)
- Postcode: 6430
Suburbs around Hannans
Karlkurla	Karlkurla / Mullingar	Mullingar
Karlkurla	Hannans	Mullingar
Karlkurla	West Lamington	Lamington

Hannans is a residential suburb of Kalgoorlie–Boulder, a city in the Eastern Goldfields region of Western Australia. At the 2016 census it had a population of 2,546 people, up from 2,483 in 2011. Hannans is named after Paddy Hannan, the prospector whose discovery of gold in 1893 led to the initial rush. The name Hannans (shortened from Hannan's Camp) originally referred to the Kalgoorlie townsite, and it was only much later in the city's history that it was applied to the current suburb.

== Geography ==
Hannans contains Kalgoorlie–Boulder's northernmost dwellings, which are located around 4 kilometres (2.5 mi) from the Kalgoorlie town centre. The suburb is roughly diamond-shaped, with large areas of uncleared bushland in the north and east. Hannans is bounded by the Leonora branch line of Eastern Goldfields Railway to the north-east; by Killarney Street to the south-east; by a series of minor roads to the south-west; and to the north-west by a line running parallel to a track leading back to the railway.

== Features ==
Hannans contains a government-run K-6 school, Hannans Primary School, which was established in 1992. Most of the suburb's north is occupied by the Karlkurla Bushland Park, which was created in 2000 and contains 200 hectares (490 acres) of native fauna designed to mimic the pre-mining environment.
