= Kalgoorlie (suburb) =

Coordinates: 30°44′56″S 121°27′58″E

- Suburb
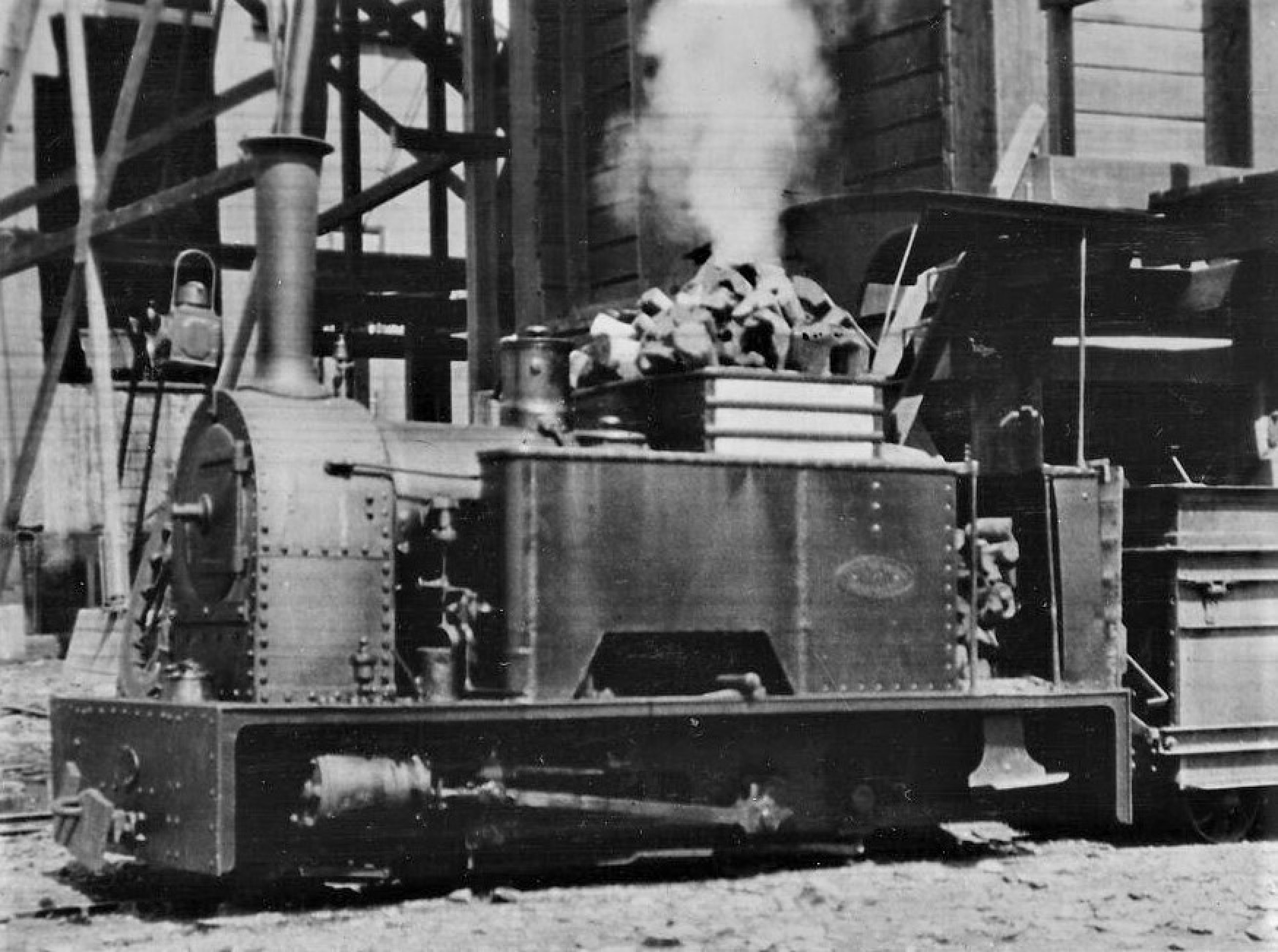
- Great Boulder Co.'s 2 ft (610 mm) gauge Kerr, Stuart 0-4-0T loco N° 839 of 1903 at Kalgoorlie
- Interactive map of Kalgoorlie
- Country: Australia
- State: Western Australia
- City: Kalgoorlie
- LGA: City of Kalgoorlie–Boulder
- Established: 1893

Government
  - State electorate: Kalgoorlie
  - Federal division: O'Connor

Area
  - Total: 4.0 km^{2} (1.5 sq mi)

Population
  - Total: 3,711 (SAL 2021)
- Postcode: 6430
Suburbs around Kalgoorlie
Piccadilly	Mullingar	Williamstown
West Lamington	Kalgoorlie	Williamstown
Somerville	South Kalgoorlie	South Kalgoorlie

Kalgoorlie is the central suburb of the Kalgoorlie–Boulder metropolitan area in the Goldfields–Esperance region of Western Australia.
