= List of State Register of Heritage Places in the Shire of Yilgarn =

List of heritage sites in Western Australia

The State Register of Heritage Places is maintained by the Heritage Council of Western Australia. As of 2026, 116 places are heritage-listed in the Shire of Yilgarn, of which 15 are on the State Register of Heritage Places.

== List ==
The Western Australian State Register of Heritage Places, as of 2026, lists the following 15 state registered places within the Shire of Yilgarn:

Place name	Place #	Street number	Street name	Suburb or town	Co-ordinates	Notes & former names	Photo
No. 6 Steam Pumping Station (former), Ghooli	2789		Great Eastern Highway	Ghooli	31.254388°S 119.456621°E		
Our Lady of Montserrat, Southern Cross	2801	50	Altair Street	Southern Cross	31.229922°S 119.324169°E	Domus Di, St Joseph's Catholic Church	
Court House & Registrar's Office (former)	2804	26	Antares Street	Southern Cross	31.23158°S 119.327688°E	Yilgarn History Museum	
Police Lock-up (former)	2806		Antares Street	Southern Cross	31.231524°S 119.326793°E		
Southern Cross Post Office	2808	24	Antares Street	Southern Cross	31.231789°S 119.327838°E		
Palace Hotel, Southern Cross	2812	6	Orion Street	Southern Cross	31.233851°S 119.329637°E	Anniversary Hostel	
Masonic Hall (former), Southern Cross	2815	14	Spica Street	Southern Cross	31.231983°S 119.330023°E	Masonic Temple	
Koorarawalyee Tank	5977		Great Eastern Highway	Mount Palmer	31.269942°S 120.004981°E	Part of the Goldfields Water Supply Scheme precinct (16610)	
Old Primary School, Southern Cross	10022	28	Antares Street	Southern Cross	31.230552°S 119.326758°E	Forrester Resource Centre, Old State School	
Bodallin Railway Dam	10055		4 km West of Bodallin	Bodallin	31.39426°S 118.795881°E	Part of the Railway Rock Catchment Dam Group, Yilgarn Precinct (25378)	
Karalee Reservoir, Rock Catchment & Aqueduct	10062		about 50 km East of Southern Cross	Southern Cross	31.261647°S 119.832322°E		
Yellowdine Catchment & Dams	10069		Reserve 3229	Yellowdine	31.287162°S 119.639137°E	Part of the Railway Rock Catchment Dam Group, Yilgarn Precinct (25378)	
Goldfields Water Supply Scheme	16610			Listed under the Coolgardie, Cunderdin, Kellerberrin, Kalgoorlie–Boulder, Merredin, Mundaring, Northam, Tammin and Yilgarn State Heritage lists		Stretches from Mundaring Weir in Perth to the Eastern Goldfields, particularly Coolgardie and Kalgoorlie	
Stone Bread Oven	16795			Yerbillon	31.393927°S 118.802895°E	Part of the Railway Rock Catchment Dam Group, Yilgarn Precinct (25378)	
Railway Rock Catchment Dam Group, Yilgarn	25378		Stephens Road	Bodallin	31.287162°S 119.639137°E		
