= List of State Register of Heritage Places in the Shire of Merredin =

List of heritage sites in Western Australia

The State Register of Heritage Places is maintained by the Heritage Council of Western Australia. As of 2026, 99 places are heritage-listed in the Shire of Merredin, of which 15 are on the State Register of Heritage Places.

== List ==
The Western Australian State Register of Heritage Places, as of 2026, lists the following 15 state registered places within the Shire of Merredin:

Place name	Place #	Street number	Street name	Suburb or town	Co-ordinates	Notes & former names	Photo
No. 4 Steam Pumping Station	1564		Great Eastern Highway	Merredin	31.491410°S 118.242473°E	Part of the Goldfields Water Supply Scheme precinct (16610)	
Merredin Post Office Residence	1566		Bates Street	Merredin	31.481699°S 118.278462°E		
Merredin Fire Station Complex	1567	28	Bates Street	Merredin	31.480508°S 118.278261°E		
Cummins Theatre	1574	31	Bates Street	Merredin	31.480088°S 118.279412°E		
Road Board Office (former)	1576		Mitchell Street	Merredin	31.480501°S 118.279631°E	Merredin Town Hall, Merredin Clock Tower Building	
Merredin Railway Station Group	1577	Lot 1503	Todd Street	Merredin	31.483011°S 118.27802°E	Merredin Railway Station Museum, Old Railway Station	
Merredin Post Office	1578	Corner	Barrack & Bates Street	Merredin	31.481919°S 118.278385°E		
Merredin Railway Water Tank	3641		Great Eastern Highway	Merredin	31.483347°S 118.279513°E	Water Tower	
Merredin Post Office Group	4035	Corner	Barrack & Bates Street	Merredin	31.481919°S 118.278385°E	Post Office, Post Office Residence (former), Telephone Line Equipment (Land Line Ex) Building	
Merredin State Farm Manager's House (former)	9080		Great Eastern Highway	Merredin	31.502185°S 118.214487°E	Merredin Research Station, Manager's House, Nangeenan Research Station	
Agricultural Bank (former), Merredin	13491	33	Bates Street	Merredin	31.479950°S 118.278926°E	Homeswest Office	
2/1 Australian General Hospital (ruins), Merredin	13516	Lot 1450	Mackenzie Crescent	Merredin	31.474997°S 118.296596°E	2/1 AGH; Army Hospital, Merredin, First Australian General Hospital Site	
Railway Dam, Merredin	13523		Gravel Track, continuation of Benson Street	Merredin	31.470293°S 118.292756°E	Durdgutling, Durdgutting, Merredin Peak Dam (Well No.8), Quarries, Wall	
Railway Housing Precinct, Merredin	15750		Kitchener Road	Merredin	31.483876°S 118.274203°E		
Goldfields Water Supply Scheme	16610			Listed under the Coolgardie, Cunderdin, Kellerberrin, Kalgoorlie–Boulder, Merredin, Mundaring, Northam, Tammin and Yilgarn State Heritage lists		Stretches from Mundaring Weir in Perth to the Eastern Goldfields, particularly Coolgardie and Kalgoorlie	
