= List of State Register of Heritage Places in the Shire of Mundaring =

List of heritage places in Western Australia

The State Register of Heritage Places is maintained by the Heritage Council of Western Australia. As of 2026, 197 places are heritage-listed in the Shire of Mundaring, of which 26 are on the State Register of Heritage Places.

== List ==
The Western Australian State Register of Heritage Places, as of 2026, lists the following 26 state registered places within the Shire of Mundaring:

Place name	Place #	Location	Suburb or town	Co-ordinates	Built	State registered	Notes	Photo
Belle View	3836	1100 Katharine Street	Bellevue	31°54′14″S 116°01′31″E	1887	2 June 1998	Also referred to as Belle View Farm and Helena Farm; A large Victorian Regency style residence	
Government Quarries (former)	16788	Hudman Road	Boya	31°55′24″S 116°04′03″E	1901	7 September 2006	Also referred to as Boya Quarry/ies, Darlington Quarry and Hudman Road Quarry; A granite and diorite quarry with six quarry faces	
Lake Leschenaultia	8568	2135 Rosedale Road	Chidlow	31°51′15″S 116°15′02″E	1898	3 June 2005	Also referred to as Chidlow Dam or Chidlow Water Supply and Chidlow's Well Reservoir; Constructed as the largest railway reservoir for the Eastern Railway	
Holmesdale	1688	Darlington Road	Darlington	31°54′49″S 116°04′21″E	1890	22 November 2005	Also referred to as Saw Estate; A small residence in the Federation Queen Anne style	
St Cuthbert's Anglican Church	1685	Corner Hillsden & Darlington Road	Darlington	31°54′57″S 116°04′31″E	1925	3 June 2005	Built in the Inter-War Gothic style	
Leithdale	8554	5–7 Lukin Avenue	Darlington	31°55′27″S 116°05′05″E	1898	17 February 2006	Also referred to as Leithdale Hostel; A single storey residence in the Federation Queen Anne style; Home of Western Australian author Mollie Skinner	
Glen Forrest Hall	1691	52 McGlew Road	Glen Forrest	31°54′35″S 116°05′59″E	1897	14 December 2001	Also referred to as Agriculture Hall, CWA Hall, Smiths Hall, Forrest Hall and Octagonal Hall; A unique example of an octagonal Flemish bond brick community hall in the West Australia	
John Forrest National Park	8561	Great Eastern Highway	Greenmount	31°52′55″S 116°04′26″E	1900	17 December 2004	Also referred to as Greenmount National Park, National Park and Darling Range; Oldest National Park in Western Australia and fourth-oldest in Australia; Contains the Eastern Railway Deviation, including the Swan View Tunnel constructed under the guidance of C. Y. O'Connor	
Blackboy Hill Memorial	4479	Innamincka Road	Greenmount	31°53′49″S 116°02′44″E	1914	31 March 2006	Also referred to as Blackboy Hill Camp; A series of sculpted arches commemorating the birthplace of the Australian Imperial Force in Western Australia and the largest military training camp in the state during World War I	
Katharine Susannah Prichard's House	1681	11 Old York Road	Greenmount	31°53′58″S 116°03′15″E	1896	28 February 1995	Also referred to as Katharine's Place and Megalong; Associated with Katharine Susannah Prichard, an Australian author and co-founding member of the Communist Party of Australia	
Clayton Farm	3839	Clayton Road	Helena Valley	31°55′05″S 116°02′29″E	1861	14 March 2008	Farm house in the Victoria Georgian style	
Eastern Railway – Three Bridges	2663	Lot 10159 Great Eastern Highway	Hovea	31°52′48″S 116°06′02″E	1882	24 July 1992	Also referred to as Bridle/Walk Trail; Three railway bridges, with the tracks having been removed after the closure of the railway in 1966	
Eastern Railway Deviation	2660	Lot 10159 Great Eastern Highway	Hovea	31°52′56″S 116°04′16″E	1894	14 February 2002	Includes Swan View Tunnel, four bridges and Mahogany Creek Deviation; Swan View Tunnel, for over 100 years, was the only railway tunnel constructed in Western Australia	
Mahogany Inn	1693	4260 Great Eastern Highway	Mahogany Creek	31°54′03″S 116°08′06″E	1854	9 September 2003	Also referred to as Mahogany Inn Hotel, Prince of Wales and Oxford Inn; Built in the Victorian Georgian style	
Mundaring Sculpture Park	8577	Jacoby Street	Mundaring	31°54′16″S 116°09′57″E	1898	28 November 2003	Also referred to as Mundaring Community Park and Mundaring Railway Station & Railway Reserve; The only Western Australian community sculpture park designed to include interactive artwork	
Mundaring Station Master's House	8531	Jacoby Street	Mundaring	31°54′14″S 116°09′55″E	1902		Also referred to as Mundaring Station-master's House; Part of the Mundaring Sculpture Park Precinct (8577)	
Faversham	4546	2075 Jacoby Street	Mundaring	31°54′18″S 116°09′17″E	1911	7 September 2007	Also referred to as Ballindown; Built in the Federation Queen Anne style	
Goldfields Water Supply Scheme	16610		Listed under the Coolgardie, Cunderdin, Kellerberrin, Kalgoorlie–Boulder, Merredin, Mundaring, Northam, Tammin and Yilgarn State Heritage lists		1898	8 December 2022		
Mundaring Weir Hotel	1675	Lot 502 Hall Road	Mundaring Weir	31°57′08″S 116°10′01″E	1898	20 April 2004	Also referred to as Goldfields Reservoir Hotel and Weir Lodge Hotel; Hotel built in the Federation Filigree style	
No 1 Pumping Station Museum	1677	Mundaring Weir Road	Mundaring Weir	31°57′21″S 116°09′47″E	1902	4 May 2001	Also referred to as CY O'Connor Museum; Part of the Goldfields Water Supply Scheme (16610)	
No 2 Pumping Station - Site of	8539	1240 Mundaring Weir Road	Mundaring	31.9434°S 116.1801°E	1902		Part of the Goldfields Water Supply Scheme (16610)	
Mundaring Weir Hall	1676	Weir Village Road	Mundaring Weir	31°57′07″S 116°10′04″E	1908	22 January 2002	Also referred to as Mechanics' Institute; Built in the Federation Arts and Crafts style	
Parkerville Children's Home & Cemetery	8546	Corner Roland & Beacon Roads, nearr corner Wilson Road	Parkerville	31°51′57″S 116°07′12″E	1903	24 November 2000	Also referred to as Babies/The Waifs Home and League of Charity Home for Waifs & Stray	
Hillston Boys Farm (former)	4038	900 Woodlands Road	Stoneville	31°51′20″S 116°09′40″E	1955	1 October 1999	Also referred to as Padbury Boys' Farm; A collection of buildings of various construction types and functions	
Wooroloo Sanatorium (former)	8566	Linley Valley Road	Wooroloo	31°48′33″S 116°19′40″E	1915	30 August 2002	Also referred to as Wooroloo Hospital, Wooroloo Training Centrand Wooroloo Prison Farm; The earliest and only large scale sanatorium established in Western Australia	
Wooroloo Cemetery	8571	Off Linley Valley Road	Wooroloo	31°48′33″S 116°19′40″E	1906	30 August 2002	Also referred to as Wooroloo Sanatorium Cemetery; The only Western Australian cemetery that was established to initially serve a hospital	
