= Tammin =

Tammin may refer to

- Tammin, Western Australia, a town
- Shire of Tammin, a local government area in Western Australia
- Tammin Sursok (born 1983), South African-born Australian actress and singer-songwriter
