= WAGR AO class =

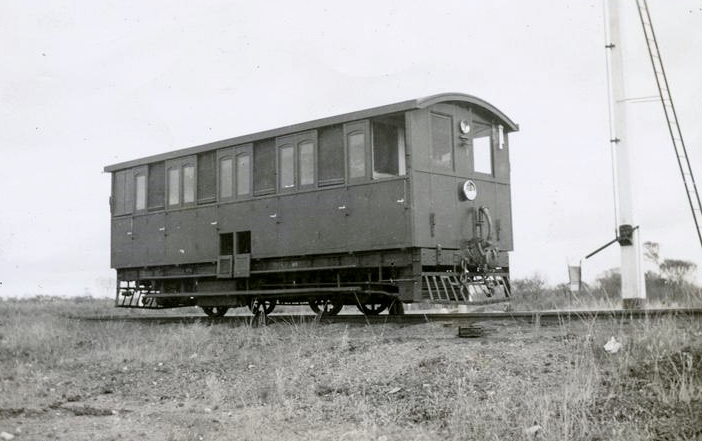
- AO 431 in Kalgoorlie-Boulder
- Manufacturer: Motor Rail & Tram Car Co Ltd
- Constructed: 1922
- Entered service: 1922
- Number built: 3
- Fleet numbers: 430–432
- Capacity: 36-40
- Operators: WAGR

Specifications
- Car length: 24 ft 4 in
- Width: 8 ft
- Wheelbase: 9 ft
- Maximum speed: 30 mph
- Prime mover(s): Dorman 4JO
- Power output: 40 hp
- Transmission: Dixon-Abbott Patent Gearbox
- Track gauge: 1,067 mm (3 ft 6 in)

The WAGR AO class was a three member class of petrol-driven railmotors or railcars operated between 1922 and 1950 by the Western Australian Government Railways (WAGR). The motorised chassis were supplied by the Motor Rail and Tram Car Co Ltd, of Bedford, England in 1922. The Agent General for Western Australia ordered them through agents Flower & Davies and they were delivered to Midland Railway Workshops for bodies to be fitted.

Initially, the cars were based at Albany, Narrogin, and Merredin.

One was destroyed by fire at Narrogin in October 1926 when petrol ignited during refuelling.

Two were at Albany in 1936 when one was destroyed by fire in the loco shed, shortly after the other had been transferred to Kalgoorlie.

The Kalgoorlie unit, 431, is the only one to have survived long enough officially to be classified as an AO class vehicle, in 1937. It was involved in a fatal level crossing accident at Coolgardie in 1938.
