= John Paul College, Kalgoorlie =

School in Kalgoorlie, Western Australia

John Paul College

Location
- South Kalgoorlie, Western Australia; Australia; 30°45′52″S 121°28′47″E

Information
- Type: Independent co-educational secondary day school
- Motto: Justice, Peace, Charity
- Denomination: Roman Catholic
- Established: 1906 (as Christian Brothers' College); 1971 (as Prendiville Catholic Girls College); 1984; 42 years ago (as John Paul College)
- Principal: Bradley Hall
- Employees: c. 90
- Years offered: 7 to 12
- Colours: Blue and maroon
- Website: jpc.wa.edu.au

John Paul College is an independent Roman Catholic co-educational high school located in South Kalgoorlie, Western Australia that caters to students from Years 7 to 12. It commenced in 1984, as a result of an amalgamation of Christian Brothers' College and Prendiville College.

== History ==
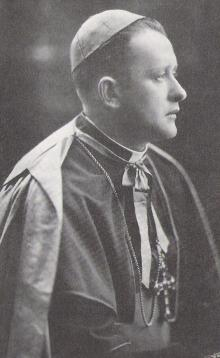
Archbishop Redmond Prendiville

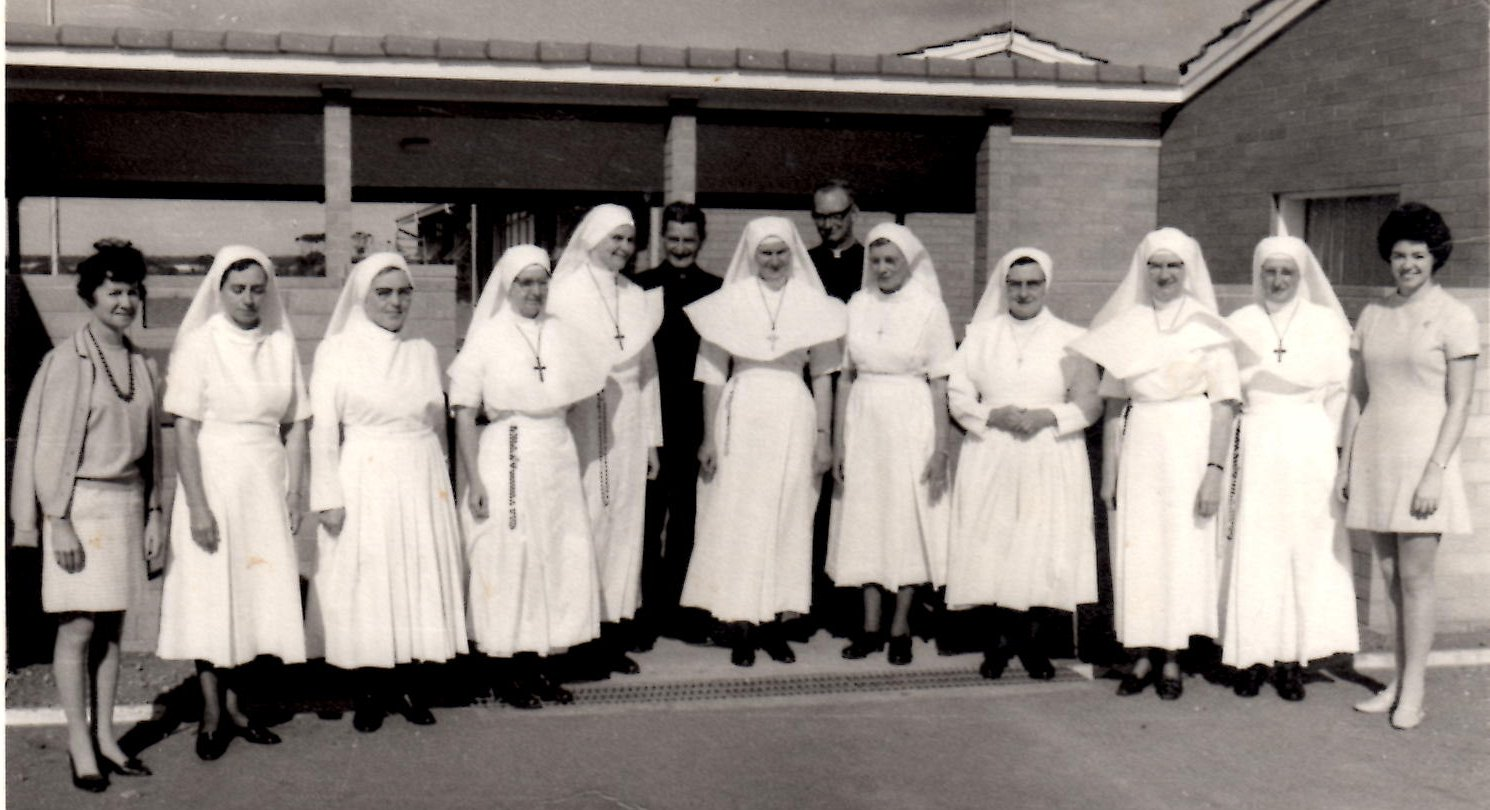
Sr Concepta with a group of Sisters of St. Joseph of the Sacred Heart

=== Christian Brothers' College ===
Christian Brothers' College was founded in 1906 in Wilson Street, by B Duggan, who served as Principal for ten years. Throughout its seventy-seven years, the College served the people of the Eastern Goldfields who supported the school, especially in time of financial hardship. In 1976 the college was relocated at Lionel Street by Bernard T Murphy. Hence, it continued its service to education with more modern facilities and more spacious grounds.

=== Prendiville College ===
Prendiville College was founded in 1971, replacing the four small existing secondary sections of the Parish schools. The college was founded as the Prendiville Catholic Girls College, named in honour of the late Archbishop Redmond Prendiville (Bishop of Perth, between 1933 and 1968). The first Principal was Sr. Concepta (Sisters of St. Joseph). The uniform was green and orange.

=== Merger ===
In 1984 Christian Brothers College amalgamated with Prendiville College. The new school was aptly named John Paul College after Pope John Paul II, elected as Pope in 1978. For the first time a co-educational Catholic secondary school functioned in Kalgoorlie. The Christian Brothers and the Sisters of St. Joseph of the Sacred Heart have been on the Eastern Goldfields since the turn of the century.

== Overview ==
Currently, John Paul College has approximately 700 students under the guidance of Principal, Bradley Hall. The college is divided into 5 houses; each with their respective name and colour. The houses are Rice, Mackillop, Clancy, Prendiville and McAuley. These houses are coloured yellow, green, red, orange and blue respectively.

At the end of the 2015 school year the school farewelled long-standing principal Joseph Hoyne. Whilst in charge he oversaw the construction of the multi-purpose room, R. P. McManus centre (gymnasium), uniform shop and the senior learning centre.
