= Shire of Tammin =

Coordinates: 31°38′28″S 117°29′28″E

- Local government area
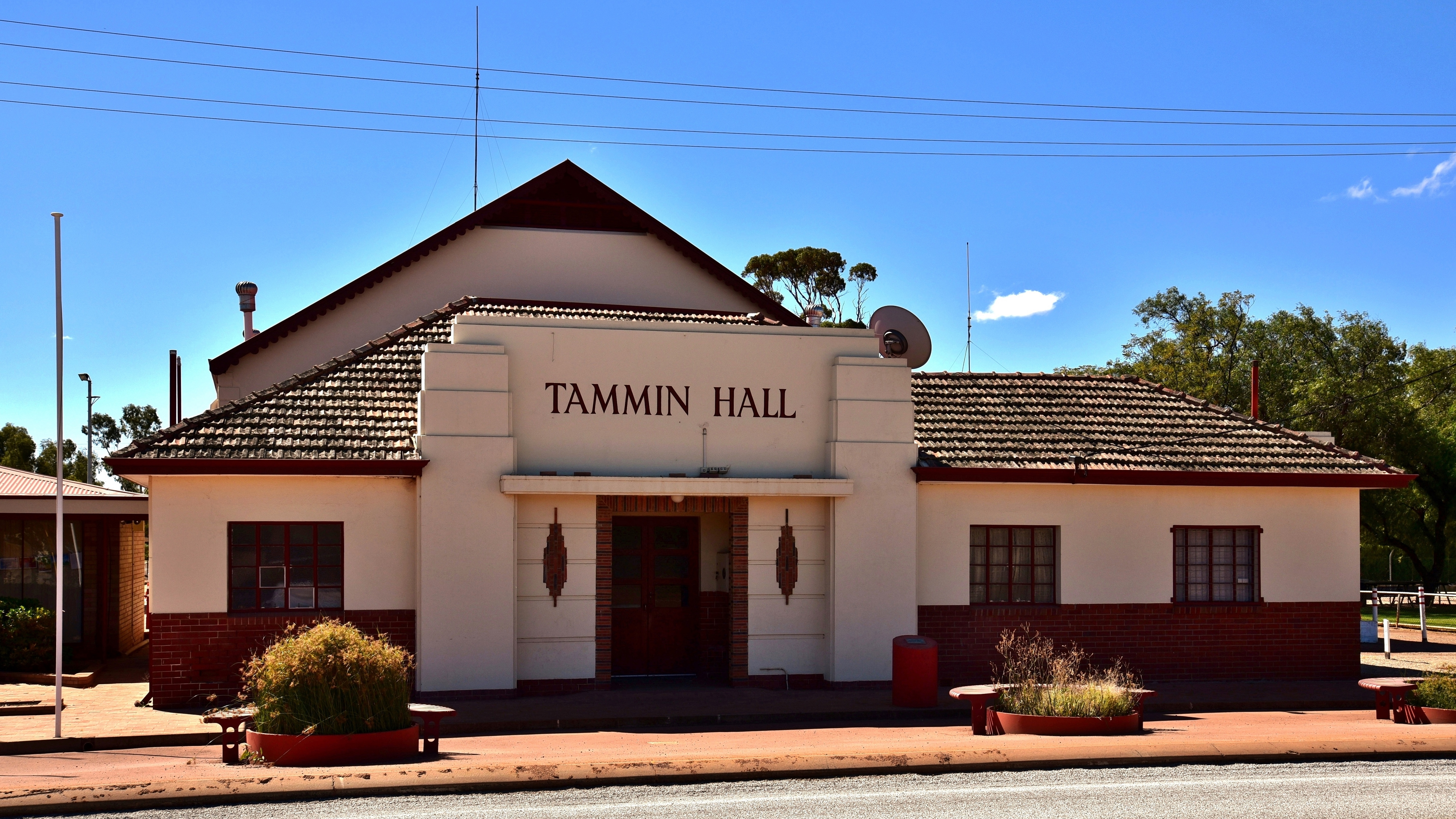
- Tammin Town Hall, 2018

- Interactive map of Shire of Tammin
- Country: Australia
- State: Western Australia
- Region: Wheatbelt
- Established: 1948
- Council seat: Tammin

Government
  - Shire President: Glenice Batchelor
  - State electorate: Central Wheatbelt
  - Federal division: Durack

Area
  - Total: 1,103.2 km^{2} (425.9 sq mi)

Population
  - Total: 386 (LGA 2021)
- Website: Shire of Tammin
LGAs around Shire of Tammin
Dowerin	Wyalkatchem	Trayning
Cunderdin	Shire of Tammin	Kellerberrin
	Quairading

The Shire of Tammin is a local government area in the Wheatbelt region of Western Australia. Its seat of government is the town of Tammin, about 80 kilometres (50 mi) west of Merredin and about 180 kilometres (112 mi) east of Perth, the state capital.

== History ==
Originally the area was governed by the Meckering Road Board (now the neighbouring Shire of Cunderdin).

The Tammin Road District was gazetted on 18 June 1948. On 1 July 1961, it became a shire under the Local Government Act 1960, which reformed all remaining road districts into shires.

=== Merger proposals ===
Tammin is one of the least populous local government areas in Western Australia. A number of proposals have been made to merge the shire with adjoining local government areas. A poll of Tammin residents in 2006 found a majority opposed to a merger. Subsequently, the shire council committed to a proposal to amalgamate with the shires of York, Cunderdin and Quairading. Planning for the merger reached an advanced stage via the South East Avon Group but was rejected by the state government's Local Government Advisory Board in 2014.

== Wards ==
The Shire has never had wards, and all six councillors sit at large. The Shire President is elected from amongst the councillors.

== Towns and localities ==
The towns and localities of the Shire of Tammin with population and size figures based on the most recent Australian census:

Locality	Population	Area	Map
North Tammin (formerly Yorkrakine)	138 (SAL 2021)	625.8 km^{2} (241.6 sq mi)	
South Tammin (formerly Bungulla)	126 (SAL 2021)	474.2 km^{2} (183.1 sq mi)	
Tammin	129 (SAL 2021)	0.8 km^{2} (0.31 sq mi)	

== Population ==
Historical population

Year	Pop.	±% p.a.
1954	895	—
1966	828	−0.65%
1971	777	−1.26%
1976	631	−4.08%
1981	555	−2.53%
1986	543	−0.44%

Year	Pop.	±% p.a.
1991	489	−2.07%
2001	423	−1.44%
2006	391	−1.56%
2011	404	+0.66%
2016	402	−0.10%
2021	386	−0.81%

== Heritage-listed places ==
As of 2023, 18 places are heritage-listed in the Shire of Tammin, of which one is on the State Register of Heritage Places.

Place name	Place #	Street number	Street name	Suburb or town	Co-ordinates	Notes & former names	Photo
Goldfields Water Supply Scheme	16610			Listed under the Coolgardie, Cunderdin, Kellerberrin, Kalgoorlie–Boulder, Merredin, Mundaring, Northam, Tammin and Yilgarn State Heritage lists		Stretches from Mundaring Weir in Perth to the Eastern Goldfields, particularly Coolgardie and Kalgoorlie	
