= South Boulder, Western Australia =

South Boulder
- Suburb
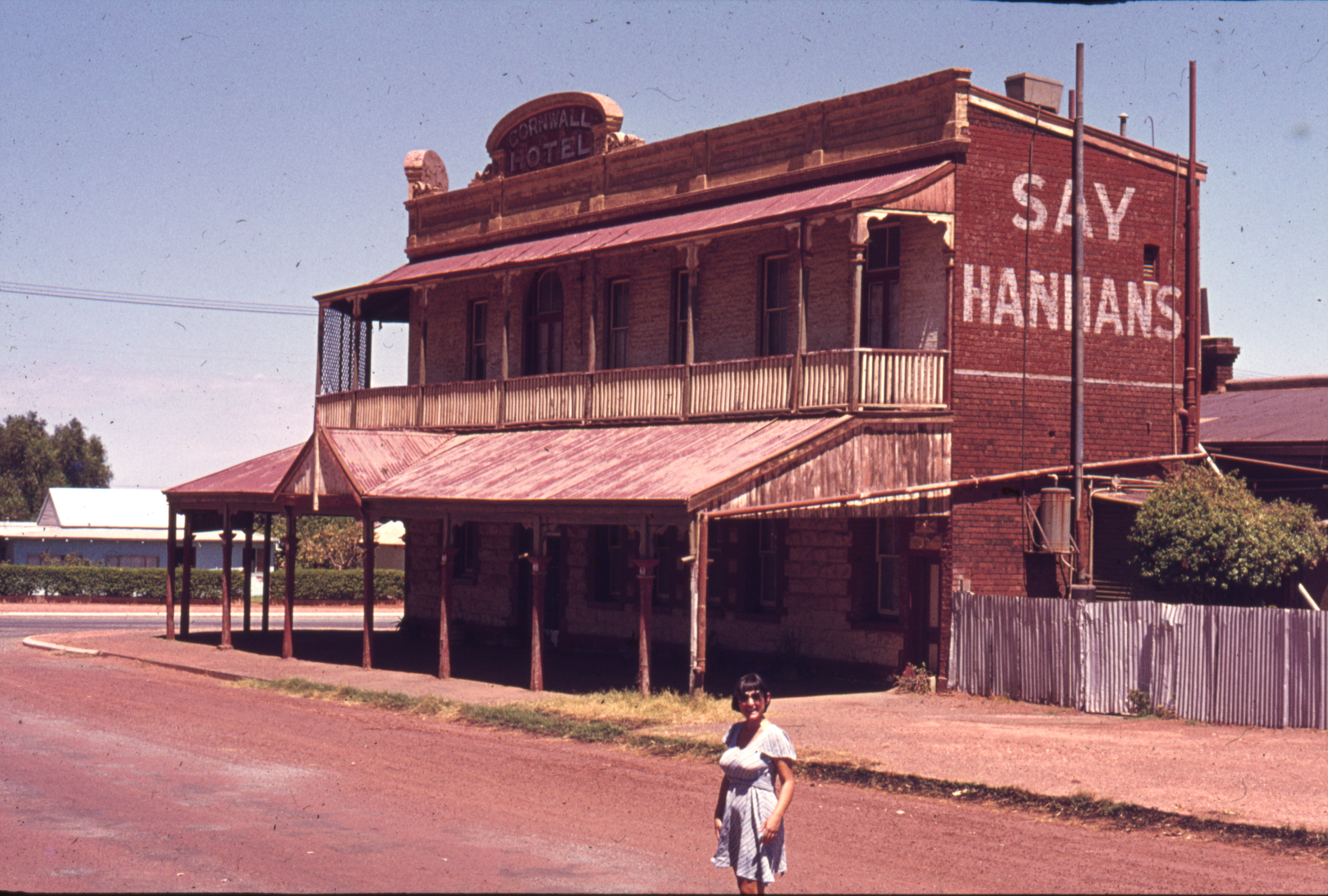
- The heritage-listed Cornwall Hotel on Hopkins St, South Boulder
- Coordinates: 30.79019°S 121.49466°E
- Country: Australia
- State: Western Australia
- City: Kalgoorlie–Boulder
- LGA(s): City of Kalgoorlie–Boulder

Government
  - State electorate(s): Kalgoorlie
  - Federal division(s): O'Connor

Area
  - Total: 10.4 km^{2} (4.0 sq mi)

Population
  - Total(s): 1,506 (SAL 2021)
- Postcode: 6432
Suburbs around South Boulder
Victory Heights	Boulder	Fimiston
Broadwood	South Boulder	Trafalgar
Yilkari	Lakewood	Lakewood

South Boulder is a mixed-use suburb of Kalgoorlie–Boulder, a city in the Eastern Goldfields region of Western Australia.

It contains the Old Boulder Cemetery. It has a large residential area immediately south of the Boulder townsite and also contains Eastern Goldfields Regional Prison on its outskirts.
