= Bungulla =

Bungulla may refer to:

- Bungulla, Western Australia
- Bungulla, a genus of Australian spiders
