= West Kalgoorlie, Western Australia =

West Kalgoorlie
- Suburb
- Interactive map of West Kalgoorlie
- Coordinates: 30.77953°S 121.43332°E
- Country: Australia
- State: Western Australia
- City: Kalgoorlie–Boulder
- LGA: City of Kalgoorlie–Boulder

Government
  - State electorate: Kalgoorlie
  - Federal division: O'Connor

Area
  - Total: 2.1 km^{2} (0.81 sq mi)

Population
  - Total: 32 (SAL 2021)
- Postcode: 6430
Suburbs around West Kalgoorlie
Karlkurla	Karlkurla; Somerville	Somerville
Yilkari	West Kalgoorlie	Broadwood
Yilkari	Yilkari	Broadwood

West Kalgoorlie is an industrial suburb of Kalgoorlie–Boulder, a city in the Eastern Goldfields region of Western Australia.
