= Mullingar (disambiguation) =

Mullingar is the county town of County Westmeath, Ireland.

Mullingar may also refer to:

- Mullingar (civil parish), civil parish of County Westmeath
- Mullingar (Parliament of Ireland constituency), defunct constituency
- Mullingar, Saskatchewan, hamlet
- Mullingar, Western Australia, suburb of Kalgoorlie
