= Kalgoorlie (disambiguation) =

Kalgoorlie is a city in the Goldfields–Esperance region of Western Australia.

Kalgoorlie may also refer to:

- City of Kalgoorlie-Boulder, the local government area that includes Kalgoorlie
- Division of Kalgoorlie, a federal division of the Australian House of Representatives
- Electoral district of Kalgoorlie, an electoral district of the Western Australian Legislative Assembly
- Kalgoorlie (suburb), a suburb of the Kalgoorlie–Boulder metropolitan area
- The Kalgoorlie, a train service operated by the Western Australian Government Railways 1962–1971
