= Somerville, Western Australia =

Somerville
- Suburb
- Interactive map of Somerville
- Coordinates: 30.76942°S 121.45323°E
- Country: Australia
- State: Western Australia
- City: Kalgoorlie–Boulder
- LGA: City of Kalgoorlie–Boulder

Government
  - State electorate: Kalgoorlie
  - Federal division: O'Connor

Area
  - Total: 4.7 km^{2} (1.8 sq mi)

Population
  - Total: 4,165 (SAL 2021)
- Postcode: 6430
Suburbs around Somerville
Karlkurla	West Lamington	Kalgoorlie
Karlkurla	Somerville	South Kalgoorlie
West Kalgoorlie	Broadwood	Victory Heights

Somerville is a residential suburb of Kalgoorlie–Boulder, a city in the Eastern Goldfields region of Western Australia.
