= Australian Prospectors & Miners' Hall of Fame =

Museum in Mullingar, Western Australia

Coordinates: 30.726849°S 121.471742°E

The Australian Prospectors & Miners' Hall of Fame is a hall of fame that recognises significant figures in the history of Australia's mining industry. It was established in 2001 at a site on the Goldfields Highway at Mullingar, on the outskirts of Kalgoorlie, Western Australia. It closed due to financial difficulties in 2011, and now exists primarily as a web-based resource.

== Overview ==
The Inductees to the Mining Hall of Fame number over 100. The institution was, after various proposals, started in Kalgoorlie in 1995. In 1997 there was an architectural competition for the design. In 1999 it was combined with the Hannans North Tourist Mine. With fundraising committees established in every state of Australia and sponsorship from the government and the mining industry, $25 million were raised for the project. The Hall of Fame was officially opened in October 2001.

Inductees are added over time, as well as historic and unique items of mining history.

In November 2011 the Hall of Fame had to close because of financial difficulties. The institution, founded by the mining industry rather than the Government of Western Australia, had been in a difficult financial situation in 2009, being $600,000 in debt. Under Andrew Cook, who took over as director at the time, the Hall of Fame slashed entry fees from $25 to $3 a ticket and was able to, at the same time, eradicate its debt. Despite this and a bail out by the government, it was not able to stay open at the time as it continued to operate at a loss.

There was some hope that the institution would reopen in late 2012. However, instead the facilities are now leased out with the tourist mine being operated by KGCM (Hannans North Tourist Mine) while the main building is closed to the public.

== Publications and reports ==
- Australian Prospectors & Miners Hall of Fame Ltd (2002), Update, Mining Hall of Fame also known earlier as Pick and Shovel - Australian Prospectors & Miners Hall of Fame Ltd (1997), The pick and shovel, The Hall

== See also ==
- Diggers & Dealers
