= Piccadilly, Western Australia =

Piccadilly
- Suburb
- Coordinates: 30.74255°S 121.46398°E
- Country: Australia
- State: Western Australia
- City: Kalgoorlie–Boulder
- LGA(s): City of Kalgoorlie–Boulder

Government
  - State electorate(s): Kalgoorlie
  - Federal division(s): O'Connor

Area
  - Total: 1.5 km^{2} (0.58 sq mi)

Population
  - Total(s): 2,305 (SAL 2021)
- Postcode: 6430
Suburbs around Piccadilly
Lamington	Lamington / Mullingar	Mullingar
Lamington	Piccadilly	Mullingar / Kalgoorlie
West Lamington	West Lamington / Kalgoorlie	Kalgoorlie

Piccadilly is a residential suburb of Kalgoorlie–Boulder, a city in the Eastern Goldfields region of Western Australia. At the 2016 census, it had a population of 2,263 people, down from 2,597 in 2011.

Piccadilly contains the Kalgoorlie Health Campus (formerly Kalgoorlie Hospital), which is the main hospital for Kalgoorlie–Boulder and the surrounding region. It also includes the city's main sporting venue, the Sir Richard Moore Sporting Complex. Piccadilly is roughly rectangular in shape, and most of its streets are on a grid pattern. The locality is bounded by Hare Street to the north-west, Hawkins Street to the south-west, and Eastern Goldfields Railway to the south-east and north-east.
