= Broadwood, Western Australia =

Broadwood
- Suburb
- Coordinates: 30.78367°S 121.45166°E
- Country: Australia
- State: Western Australia
- City: Kalgoorlie–Boulder
- LGA(s): City of Kalgoorlie–Boulder

Government
  - State electorate(s): Kalgoorlie
  - Federal division(s): O'Connor

Area
  - Total: 10 km^{2} (3.9 sq mi)

Population
  - Total(s): 759 (SAL 2021)
- Postcode: 6430
Suburbs around Broadwood
West Kalgoorlie	Somerville	Victory Heights
West Kalgoorlie	Broadwood	Victory Heights
Yilkari	Yilkari	South Boulder

Broadwood is a mixed-use suburb of Kalgoorlie–Boulder, a city in the Eastern Goldfields region of Western Australia.

It contains a small residential area, an industrial area in the west adjoining West Kalgoorlie, the Kalgoorlie–Boulder Airport in the south, and large areas of undeveloped bushland.

In 2023 the City of Kalgoorlie–Boulder approved plans for a $140 million "lifestyle village" of 397 dwellings in Broadwood.

Broadwood includes Gubrun Camp and Kapurn Camp, which are registered Aboriginal sites of significance to the Kalamaia people.
