= Karlkurla =

- Suburb
- Coordinates: 30.73328°S 121.44898°E
- Country: Australia
- State: Western Australia
- City: Kalgoorlie–Boulder
- LGA(s): City of Kalgoorlie–Boulder

Government
  - State electorate(s): Kalgoorlie
  - Federal division(s): O'Connor

Area
  - Total: 40.5 km^{2} (15.6 sq mi)

Population
  - Total(s): 270 (SAL 2021)
- Postcode: 6430
Suburbs around Karlkurla
Kanowna	Kanowna	Mullingar
Kanowna	Karlkurla	Hannans
Binduli	Yilkari / West Kalgoorlie	West Lamington

Karlkurla is a locality in the Eastern Goldfields region of Western Australia. It is a suburb of Kalgoorlie–Boulder. At the 2016 census, Karlkurla had a population of 177 people, up from 42 in 2011. The names of Karlkurla and Kalgoorlie are derived from the same root, the local Aboriginal word for the silky pear.

Karlkurla takes in Kalgoorlie's north-western outskirts. It has only a small residential section, with a few dozen dwellings located close to the eastern boundary with Hannans. The Kalgoorlie Golf Course is located to the west of the residential section, and there is also a small industrial area in the south. Almost all of the rest of the locality is uncleared bushland. Despite its name, the Karlkurla Bushland Park (a local tourist attraction) is located within the suburb of Hannans, not in Karlkurla proper.
