= Mundaring Weir Hotel =

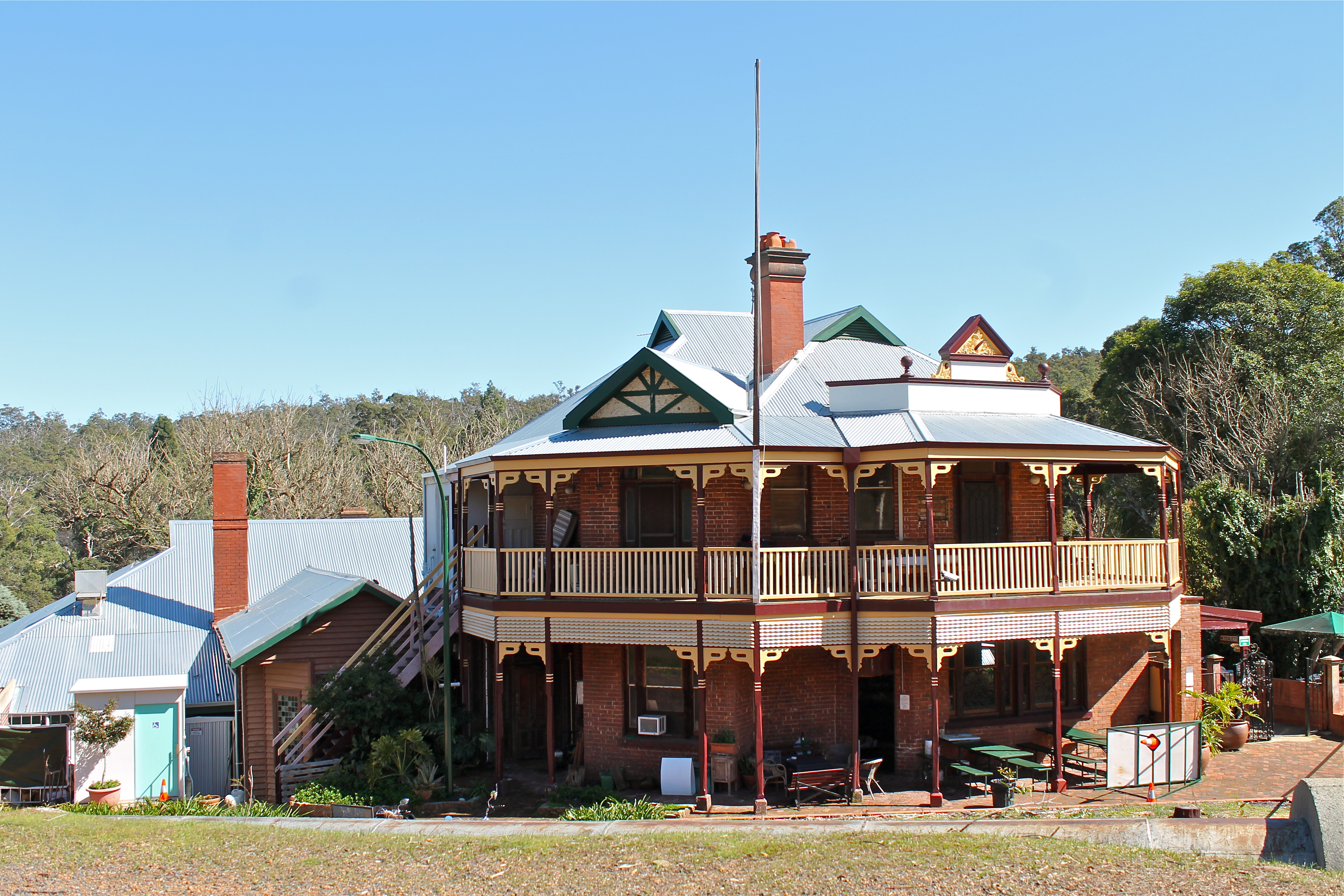
- The Hotel in 2012

- Location within Perth

General information
- Type: Australian pub
- Location: Mundaring, Western Australia
- Coordinates: 31.952266°S 116.167097°E

Western Australia Heritage Register
- Designated: 20 April 2004
- Reference no.: 1675

Mundaring Weir Hotel, is located in Mundaring, Western Australia.

It is located adjacent to the formation of the former branch line to the weir - the Mundaring Weir Railway on a hill to the north, and above Mundaring Weir.

It was previously known as the Reservoir Hotel, then the Goldfields Weir Hotel, has been in the area since 1898. It was a crucial location where C. Y. O'Connor stayed regularly during the construction of the weir.

In the 1910s and 1920s due to the functioning railway access, it was regularly advertised as a weekender location.

After a period of decline followed the closure of the branch railway in the early 1950s, as well as the gradual reduction of staff and employees of the weir, and gradual reduction in forestry operations over time.

The current owner is Jens Jorgensen, who bought it in 1984. It has been the location of annual concerts which included David Helfgott concerts during and after his recovered career as concert pianist.

== See also ==
- Mundaring Hotel
