= Eastern Goldfields Regional Prison =

Prison in Western Australia

- Eastern Goldfields Regional Prison is situated on the eastern boundary of Kalgoorlie-Boulder Airport.
- Interactive map of Eastern Goldfields Regional Prison
- Location: South Boulder, Western Australia; 30°47′26″S 121°29′10″E
- Status: Operational
- Security class: Minimum (small maximum section) (Male and female)
- Capacity: 350 plus 20 at work camp
- Opened: October 1980
- Managed by: Department of Justice, Western Australia

Eastern Goldfields Regional Prison is an Australian prison located in South Boulder, Western Australia.

== Foundation ==
It replaced the Kalgoorlie Regional Prison in December 1980. The old prison was retained as an annexe to the new prison for three years to hold maximum and medium-security prisoners on a short-term basis. It was closed down permanently with the opening of a maximum-security remand block at the new prison in 1983.

In April 2005, the prison opened the Mount Morgans work camp, which allows approved low-risk prisoners to live, care for themselves and work under supervision in the area. The Mount Morgans work camp was closed in 2011 and 2 months later the brand new Warburton work camp was opened.

A variety of employment and educational activities are available to prisoners. An education officer and tutors provide a range of education activities/courses from basic numeracy and literacy to university subjects. Courses are provided specifically for Aboriginal prisoners. Training is also conducted in a number of trades with formal accreditation gained on completion.
