= Williamstown, Western Australia =

Williamstown
- Suburb
- Coordinates: 30.74473°S 121.48069°E
- Country: Australia
- State: Western Australia
- City: Kalgoorlie–Boulder
- LGA(s): City of Kalgoorlie–Boulder

Government
  - State electorate(s): Kalgoorlie
  - Federal division(s): O'Connor

Area
  - Total: 4.4 km^{2} (1.7 sq mi)

Population
  - Total(s): 124 (SAL 2021)
- Postcode: 6430
Suburbs around Williamstown
| Mullingar | Mullingar | Parkeston |
| Kalgoorlie | Williamstown | Parkeston; Brown Hill |
| South Kalgoorlie | South Kalgoorlie; Brown Hill | Brown Hill |

Williamstown is a mixed-use suburb of Kalgoorlie–Boulder, a city in the Eastern Goldfields region of Western Australia.

It is located to the east of the main Kalgoorlie townsite, and is separated from other residential areas by the Goldfields Highway. It contains the Mount Charlotte Gold Mine.

Williamstown was a stop on the Brown Hill Loop railway line.

In the 2010s residents of Williamstown were increasingly affected by blasting activities following the expansion of the nearby Super Pit gold mine. In November 2021, Northern Star Resources made offers of relocation to 80 residents of the suburb.
