= Victory Heights, Western Australia =

Victory Heights
- Suburb
- Coordinates: 30.77941°S 121.47077°E
- Country: Australia
- State: Western Australia
- City: Kalgoorlie–Boulder
- LGA(s): City of Kalgoorlie–Boulder

Government
  - State electorate(s): Kalgoorlie
  - Federal division(s): O'Connor

Area
  - Total: 0.9 km^{2} (0.35 sq mi)

Population
  - Total(s): 772 (SAL 2021)
- Postcode: 6432
Suburbs around Victory Heights
Somerville	Somerville	South Kalgoorlie
Broadwood	Victory Heights	Boulder
Broadwood	Boulder	Boulder

Victory Heights is a residential suburb of Kalgoorlie–Boulder, a city in the Eastern Goldfields region of Western Australia. At the 2016 census it had a population of 893 people, down from 908 at the 2011 census.

== Geography ==
Victory Heights is bounded by Millen Street and Johnston Street to the north, Gatacre Drive to the west, Burt Street to the south, and Ivanhoe Street to the east. The two residential areas of the suburb (a larger western area and a smaller eastern area) are divided by Gribble Creek, an ephemeral waterway with bushland on both sides.

== History ==
Victory Heights was established by the Boulder Municipal Council after World War II to fill a housing shortage. The development was constructed on land bought from the federal government, which had previously been used to house servicemen working at RAAF Base Kalgoorlie. Victory Heights was officially opened in March 1947 by John Teahan, the Mayor of Boulder, with the subdivision's name having been chosen by local schoolchildren the previous year.
