= List of railways constructed by the Public Works Department of Western Australia =

Government railway lines in Western Australia in the nineteenth century, and early twentieth century were constructed by the Public Works Department of Western Australia and then were operated by the Western Australian Government Railways after construction until the 1920s.

Data compiled from Gunzburg and Austin, 2008.
Year	Line	Section of line	WAGR division	Date of contract	Date opened	Notes or alternative names
1879		Geraldton – Northampton	Northern Railway	24 February 1874	26 July 1879	
...TBC...
1893	South Western Railway	East Perth–Jarrahdale Junction		17 November 1891	2 May 1893	
1893	South Western Railway	Jarrahdale Junction–Pinjarra		19 May 1892	22 May 1893	
...TBC...
1898		Fremantle–Robbs Jetty	South West	February 1898	22 October 1898	
1899		Mundaring - Mundaring Weir	Goldfields Water Supply	25 April 1897	December 1898	
1900		Bellevue–Helena Vale Racecourse	Eastern Railway	1900	December 1900	
1902		Kalgoorlie–Brown Hill loop	Eastern Goldfields Railway	March 1901	17 March 1902	
1902		East Northam–Goomalling	Eastern Railway	March 1900	1 July 1902	
1903		Menzies–Leonora	Eastern Godfields Railway	25 February 1901	12 January 1903	
1903		Cue–Nannine	Northern Railway	22 April 1901	1 June 1903	
1903		Robbs Jetty–Coogee	South West Railway	1902	1 July 1903	
1903		Collie–Collie Cardiff	South West Railway	1903	2 November 1903	
1906		Robbs Jetty–Jandakot	South West Railway	12 January 1905	1 April 1906	
1906		Narrogin–Darkan	South West Railway	22 March 1905	7 September 1906	
