= Mundaring Weir railway line =

Former railway line in Mundaring, Western Australia

Mundaring Weir branch
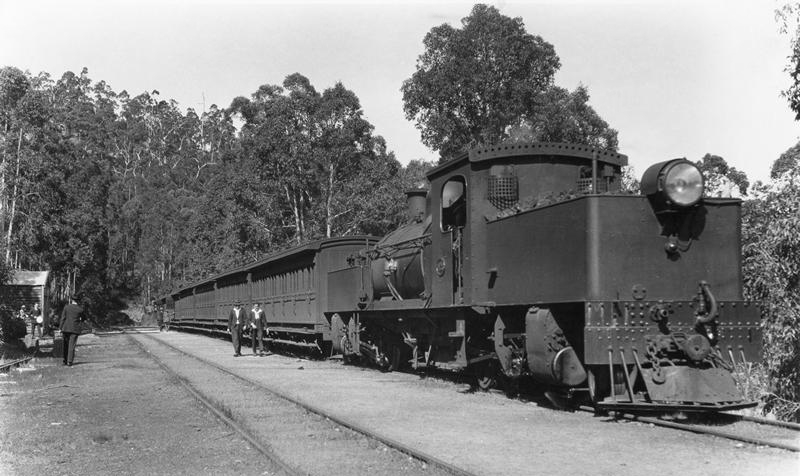
- A WAGR Ms class Garratt locomotive with a passenger train at Mundaring Weir, 1930s.

Overview
- Status: Closed
- Owner: PWD - then WAGR
- Termini: Mundaring; Mundaring Weir

Service
- Type: Heavy rail
- System: WAGR
- Operator: PWD - then WAGR

History
- Opened: 1 June 1898
- Closed: 14 November 1952

Technical
- Number of tracks: Single
- Track gauge: 3 ft 6 in (1,067 mm)

The Mundaring Weir branch railway was constructed from Mundaring, Western Australia to the site of the Mundaring Weir, and opened on 1 June 1898.

== Overview ==
One of the rail lines constructed by the Public Works Department in the early 20th century, the line was specifically built for the construction of the weir, and incorporated a zig zag.

The line taken over by the Western Australian Government Railways some years after its construction. It was improved with ballasting and work on the line to accommodate heavier rolling stock on excursion trains. The branch was popular for picnics and excursions to the weir between the 1910s and 1940s. The current route of Mundaring Weir Road crosses the formation of the railway at two locations before the site of former No 2 Power station, and is parallel from the Weir road junction to the Mundaring Weir Hotel.

== Difficulties ==
Due to the steep grades down to Mundaring Weir, a limited range of locomotives were permitted to be run on the line.

In the 1940s the declining availability of Msa Garratt steam locomotives affected the number excursion trains that could run to the weir. This was a particular problem during times when the weir overflowed, because the Msa Garratt seemed to be the only engine in service capable of negotiating the steep gradients.

The line was last used for passenger traffic in July 1950, freight traffic in September 1950 and it was closed on 14 November 1952. A bill to officially close the line passed state parliament in December 1952, with the Railway (Mundaring–Mundaring Weir) Discontinuance Act 1952 allowing for the closure and sale or disposal of the materials the line.

Services on the connecting line, Mundaring branch railway, ceased traffic on 23 January 1954. The line was closed by parliament in 1966.

Different proposals since 1966 to resurrect the railway line as a tourist attraction have not materialised.

== Stopping places ==
The branch commenced to the east of the Mundaring railway station yard.

- Mundaring Weir
- Kardo Mordo, adjacent to the Mundaring Weir Hotel and Mundaring Weir Mechanics' Institute
- Portagabra (near the current roundabout intersection turnoff to the Kookaburra Outdoor Cinema). Portagabra was the transfer station for cement railed from the Rivervale cement plant for the works to increase the height of Mundaring Weir in 1948.
- O'Connor, opened as No. 2 Pumping Station in 1922. Renamed O'Connor c.1930.
- Wonyil, west along the track where the line formation separates from the Mundaring Weir Road)

== See also ==
- Goldfields Water Supply Scheme
- List of railways constructed by the Public Works Department of Western Australia
