= Mullingar, Western Australia =

Mullingar
- Suburb
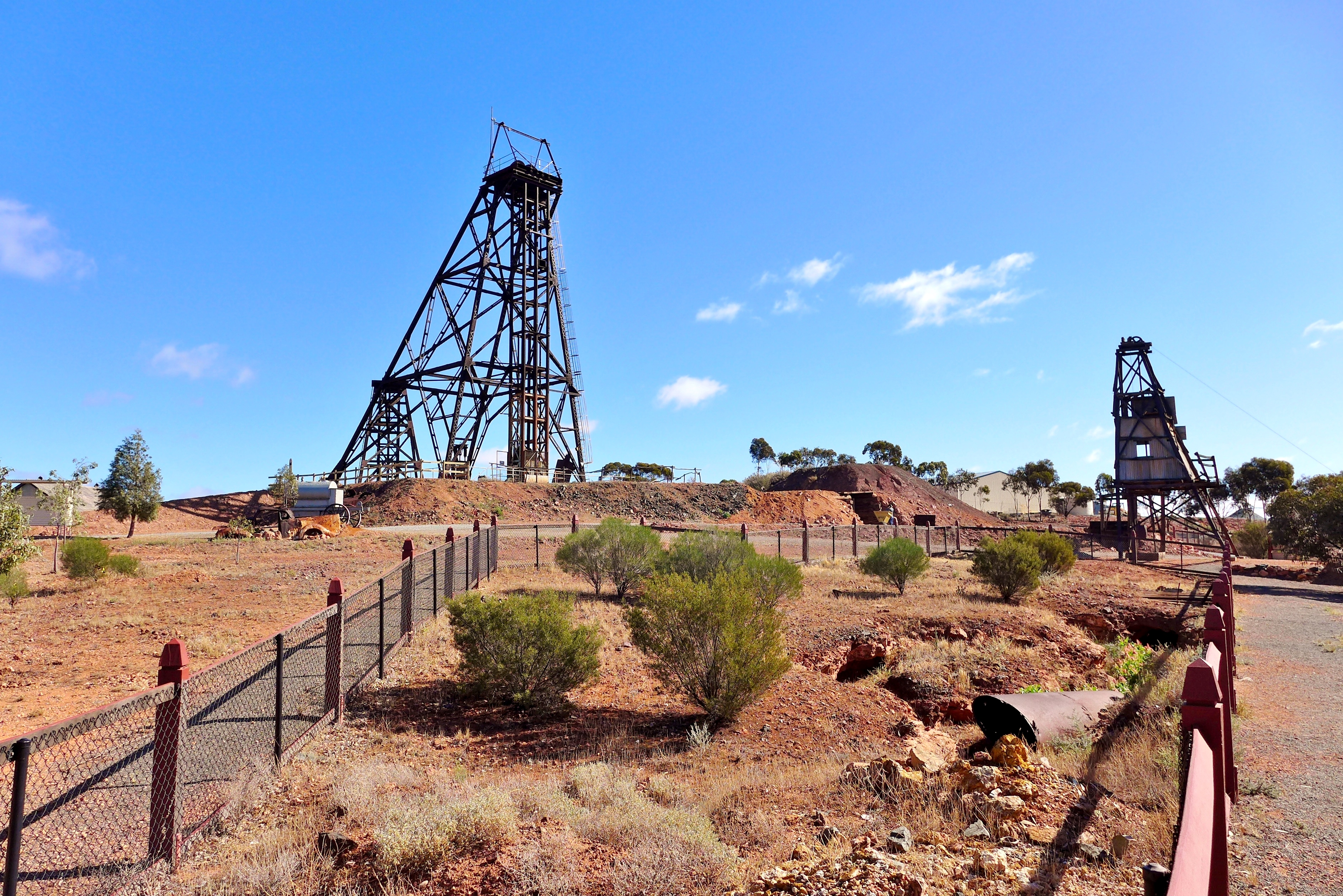
- The Hannans North Tourist Mine, a local attraction in Mullingar
- Coordinates: 30.73380°S 121.47094°E
- Country: Australia
- State: Western Australia
- City: Kalgoorlie–Boulder
- LGA(s): City of Kalgoorlie–Boulder

Government
  - State electorate(s): Kalgoorlie
  - Federal division(s): O'Connor

Area
  - Total: 57.2 km^{2} (22.1 sq mi)

Population
  - Total(s): 318 (SAL 2021)
- Postcode: 6430
Suburbs around Mullingar
Kanowna	Kanowna	Kanowna
Karlkurla / Hannans	Mullingar	Parkeston
Lamington / Piccadilly	Kalgoorlie / Williamstown	Parkeston

Mullingar is a locality in the Eastern Goldfields region of Western Australia. It is a suburb of Kalgoorlie–Boulder. At the 2016 census, Mullingar had a population of 305 people, down from 343 in 2011.

== Geography ==
Mullingar is wedge-shaped, with its northern boundary an east-west line approximately 10 kilometres (6.2 mi) north of the Kalgoorlie town centre. Its western boundary runs north-northwest along the Leonora branch line of Eastern Goldfields Railway, while the eastern boundary of the locality runs north-east, roughly parallel to (and briefly along) Yarri Road. Only a small area of Mullingar is residential, specifically the area south of the Goldfields Highway and adjacent to the suburbs of Lamington and Piccadilly (from which it is separated by the railway). The remainder of Mullingar is mostly bushland, with some areas in the south used for mining.

== History ==
Mullingar was being used as a locality name within the first few years of Kalgoorlie's existence, presumably chosen for the Irish town of the same name. In 1897, one of its residents had a home of a high enough standard to host Henry Charles Richards, a visiting British MP. Mullingar had 110 residents in the unofficial census of 1898, with its population increasing to 387 at the official 1901 census. In 1934, a reporter for Perth's Daily News noted that most of Mullingar's houses had survived the downturn of the 1920s, unlike in surrounding suburbs where many owners had dismantled them.

== Attractions ==
The Kalgoorlie Speedway has been located in Mullingar since 1992, situated on the Goldfields Highway approximately 3.5 kilometres (2.2 mi) north of the residential area. The south of the locality contains the Hannans North Tourist Mine, which was established in 1991 to demonstrate historical mining techniques. The Australian Prospectors & Miners' Hall of Fame was located on the Hannans North site from 2001 to 2011, when it closed due to financial difficulties.
