= Lamington, Western Australia =

Lamington
- Suburb
- Coordinates: 30.73409°S 121.46174°E
- Country: Australia
- State: Western Australia
- City: Kalgoorlie–Boulder
- LGA(s): City of Kalgoorlie–Boulder

Government
  - State electorate(s): Kalgoorlie
  - Federal division(s): O'Connor

Area
  - Total: 1.2 km^{2} (0.46 sq mi)

Population
  - Total(s): 2,036 (SAL 2021)
- Postcode: 6430
Suburbs around Lamington
Hannans	Hannans	Mullingar
Hannans / West Lamington	Lamington	Mullingar / Piccadilly
West Lamington	West Lamington / Piccadilly	Piccadilly

Lamington (historically known as Lamington Heights) is a residential suburb of Kalgoorlie–Boulder, a city in the Eastern Goldfields region of Western Australia. It had a population of 2,112 at the 2016 census, down from 2,278 in 2011.

Lamington was one of Kalgoorlie's first suburbs. It is bounded by Killarney Street to the northwest; Butterfly Street, Lyall Street, Memorial Drive, and Parsons Street to the southwest; Hare Street to the southeast; and the railway to the northeast. The streets are laid out in a grid pattern.
