= South Kalgoorlie, Western Australia =

South Kalgoorlie
- Suburb
- Coordinates: 30.76400°S 121.47819°E
- Country: Australia
- State: Western Australia
- City: Kalgoorlie–Boulder
- LGA(s): City of Kalgoorlie–Boulder

Government
  - State electorate(s): Kalgoorlie
  - Federal division(s): O'Connor

Area
  - Total: 3.1 km^{2} (1.2 sq mi)

Population
  - Total(s): 4,416 (SAL 2021)
- Postcode: 6430
Suburbs around South Kalgoorlie
Kalgoorlie	Kalgoorlie; Williamstown	Williamstown
Kalgoorlie	South Kalgoorlie	Brown Hill
Somerville	Victory Heights; Boulder	Boulder

South Kalgoorlie is a residential suburb of Kalgoorlie, a city in the Eastern Goldfields region of Western Australia.

It contains Kalgoorlie–Boulder Community High School and John Paul College, Kalgoorlie.
