= Irishtown, Western Australia =

Locality in Western Australia

Irishtown
- Town
- Coordinates: 31.588876°S 116.654187°E
- Country: Australia
- State: Western Australia
- LGA(s): Shire of Northam

Government
  - State electorate(s): Central Wheatbelt
  - Federal division(s): Durack

Area
  - Total: 54.2 km^{2} (20.9 sq mi)

Population
  - Total(s): 98 (SAL 2021)
- Postcode: 6401

Irishtown is a locality in the Wheatbelt region of Western Australia near Northam. It is situated 7 km (4 mi) to the north of Northam and 85 km (53 mi) from Perth. It encompasses an area of approximately 54 km^{2} (21 sq mi) and has 73 residents.
