= Bungulla, Western Australia =

Bungulla
- Town
- Interactive map of Bungulla
- Coordinates: 31°39′20.27″S 117°36′31.28″E
- Country: Australia
- State: Western Australia
- LGA: Shire of Tammin
- Location: 191 km (119 mi) east of Perth; 12 km (7.5 mi) west of Kellerberrin; 34 km (21 mi) east of Cunderdin
- Established: 1910

Government
  - State electorate: Central Wheatbelt
  - Federal division: Durack
- Elevation: 288 m (945 ft)

Population
  - Total: 126 (2021 census)
- Postcode: 6410

Bungulla is a small town located on the Great Eastern Highway in the central Wheatbelt region of Western Australia. In the 2021 Australian census, the area has been listed as South Tammin and registered a population of 126.

The town came into being as a railway station on the line to Merredin. Its name is Aboriginal in origin; the word Bun-Galla means the part of the body situated above the hips. The townsite was gazetted in 1910.
