= West Lamington, Western Australia =

West Lamington
- Suburb
- Interactive map of West Lamington
- Coordinates: 30.74764°S 121.44882°E
- Country: Australia
- State: Western Australia
- City: Kalgoorlie–Boulder
- LGA: City of Kalgoorlie–Boulder

Government
  - State electorate: Kalgoorlie
  - Federal division: O'Connor

Area
  - Total: 3 km^{2} (1.2 sq mi)

Population
  - Total: 1,373 (SAL 2021)
- Postcode: 6430
Suburbs around West Lamington
Karlkurla	Hannans	Lamington
Karlkurla	West Lamington	Piccadilly
Karlkurla	Somerville	Kalgoorlie

West Lamington is a residential suburb of Kalgoorlie–Boulder, a city in the Eastern Goldfields region of Western Australia.
