= Boulder, Western Australia =

Boulder
- Suburb
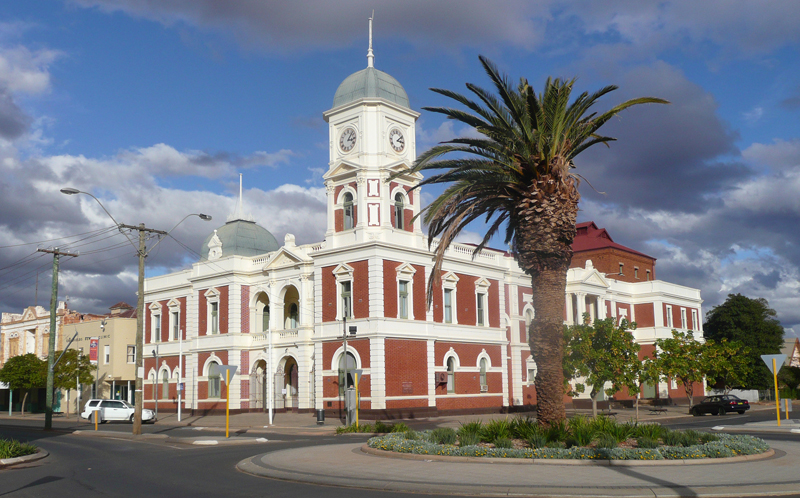
- Boulder Town Hall
- Interactive map of Boulder
- Coordinates: 30°46′55″S 121°29′19″E
- Country: Australia
- State: Western Australia
- City: Kalgoorlie
- LGA: City of Kalgoorlie–Boulder
- Location: 4.2 km (2.6 mi) S of Kalgoorlie; 597 km (371 mi) E of Perth; 386 km (240 mi) N of Esperance

Government
  - State electorate: Kalgoorlie
  - Federal division: O'Connor

Area
  - Total: 4.5 km^{2} (1.7 sq mi)
- Elevation: 355 m (1,165 ft)

Population
  - Total: 4,872 (SAL 2021)
- Postcode: 6432
Suburbs around Boulder
South Kalgoorlie	South Kalgoorlie	Brown Hill
Victory Heights	Boulder	Fimiston
Broadwood	South Boulder	South Boulder

Boulder is a suburb of Kalgoorlie in the Western Australian Goldfields, 597 kilometres (371 mi) east of Perth.

The Boulder (horse) Races were a significant event in early twentieth century goldfields region history.

The town maintained its separation from Kalgoorlie until the 1980s, however even prior to that era, many surveys and studies of the towns and their areas tended to join the names.

Prior to 1989, Boulder was a town, but it was merged with Kalgoorlie to form the City of Kalgoorlie–Boulder.

The population of Boulder in 1901 was 2,936 (1850 males and 1086 females), which increased to 5,658 (3090 males and 2568 females) in 1903.

At the 2006 census, Boulder had a population of 5,178. This had decreased to 4,825 by the 2016 census.

On 20 April 2010 Kalgoorlie-Boulder suffered a magnitude 5.0 earthquake which damaged several of the historic buildings in Boulder.

== Military history ==
During World War II, Boulder was the location of RAAF No.27 Inland Aircraft Fuel Depot, completed in 1942 and closed on 14 June 1944. Usually consisting of 4 tanks, 31 fuel depots were built across Australia for the storage and supply of aircraft fuel for the RAAF and the US Army Air Forces at a total cost of £900,000 ($1,800,000).

== See also ==
- Andrew Wilson (architect), designer of the Boulder Town Hall
- Town of Boulder
- Shire of Boulder
