= Mundaring Weir =

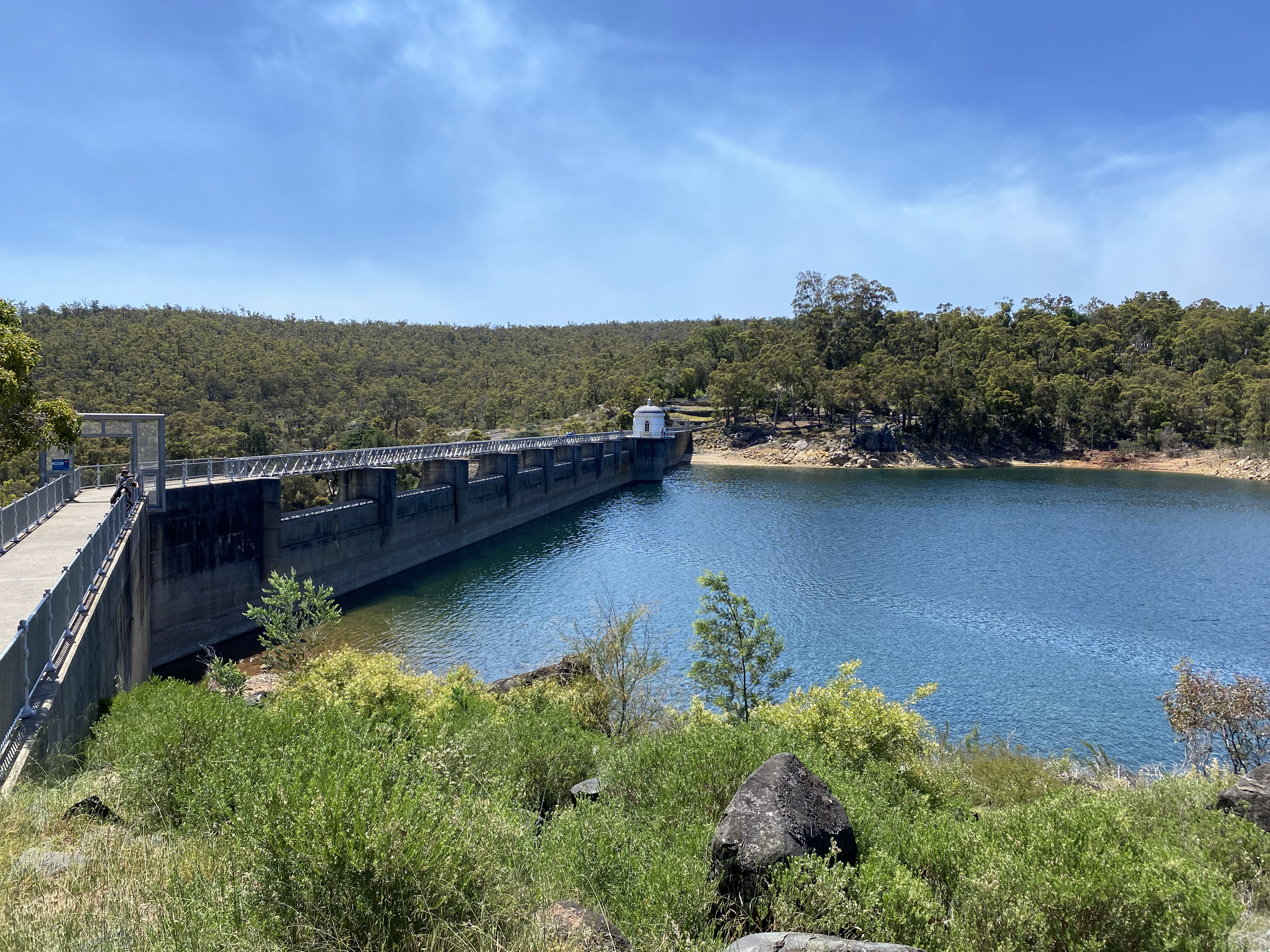
Mundaring Weir, 27 October, 2024

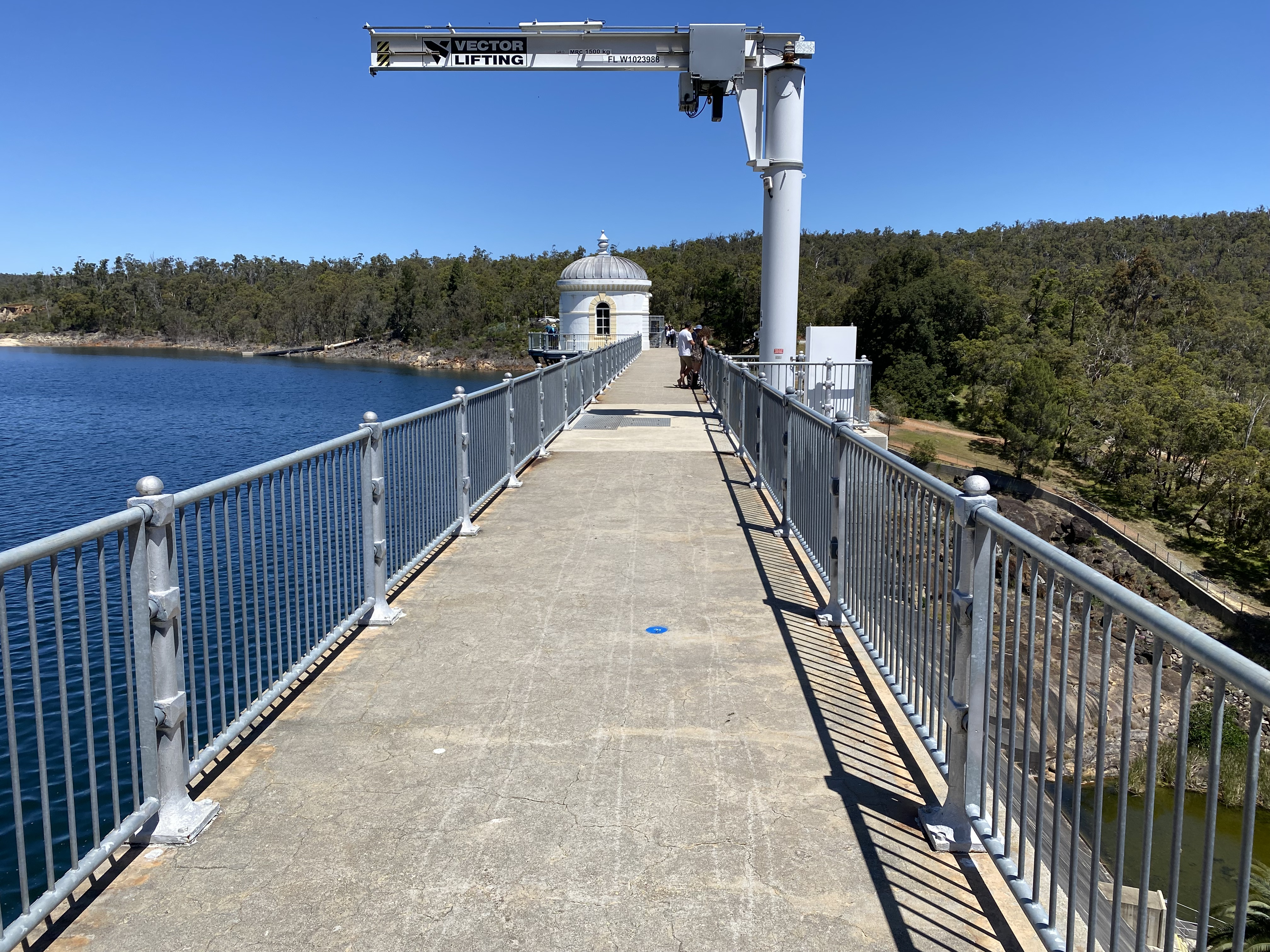
Mundaring Weir, 27 October, 2024

Mundaring Weir is a concrete gravity dam (and historically the adjoining locality) located 39 kilometres (24 mi) from Perth, Western Australia in the Darling Scarp. The dam and reservoir form the boundary between the suburbs of Reservoir and Sawyers Valley. The dam impounds the Helena River.

== History ==
Lake C.Y. O'Connor Helena River Reservoir
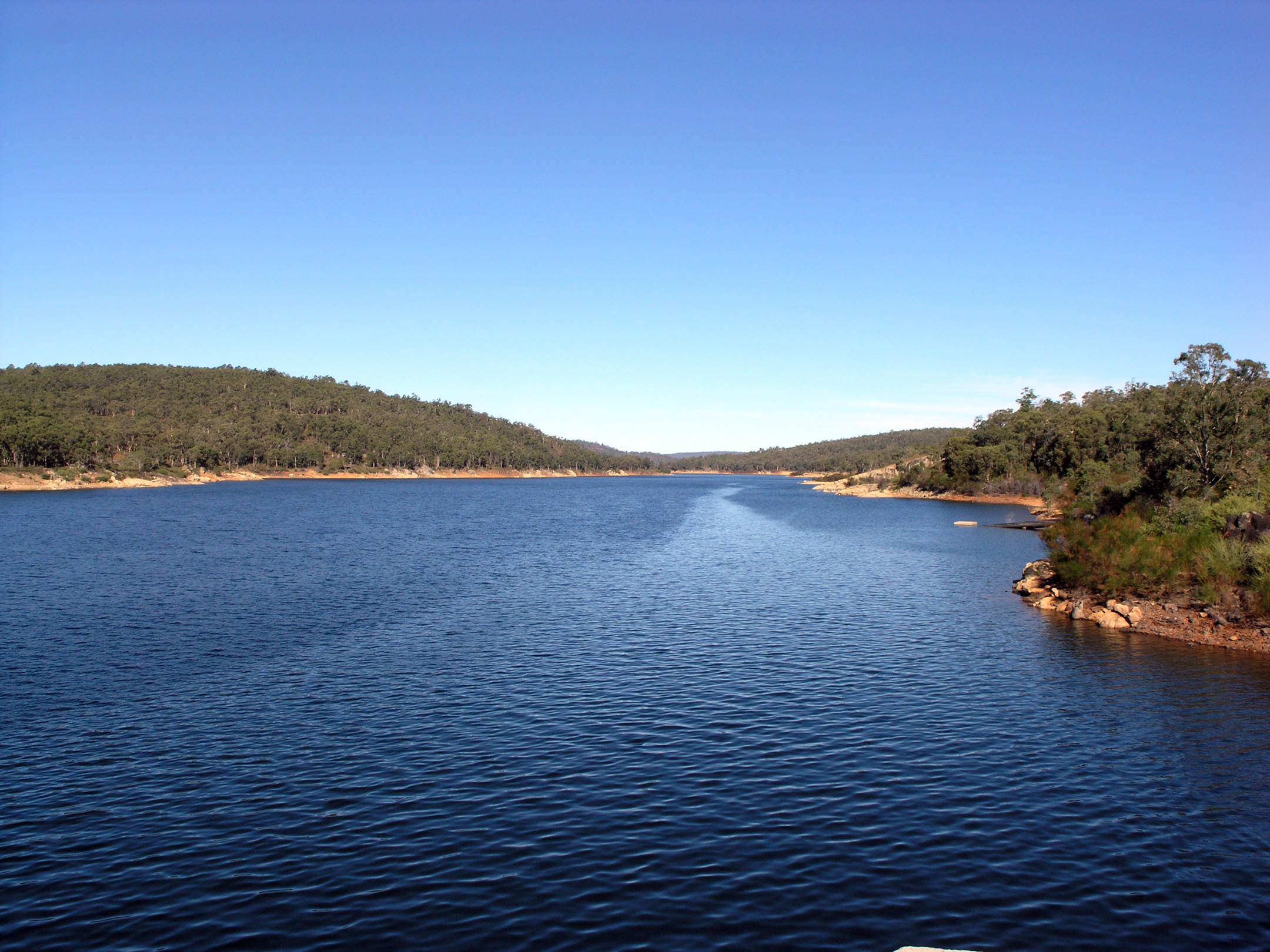

- Location within Western Australia
- Interactive map of Lake C.Y. O'Connor; Helena River Reservoir
- Location: Mundaring, Western Australia
- Coordinates: 31°59′S 116°12′E
- Type: reservoir
- Primary inflows: Helena River
- Primary outflows: Helena River
- Basin countries: Australia
- Surface area: 6.76 km^{2} (2.61 sq mi)

A soldier, Ensign Robert Dale, became the first European to explore the region in 1829.

European populations did not grow significantly until construction of the dam in the late 1890s. This involved the building of a Mundaring Weir railway line from Mundaring to the Mundaring Weir site.

The Irish Australian engineer C. Y. O'Connor was involved in the design of a scheme that transported water to the Eastern Goldfields of Coolgardie and Kalgoorlie in the eastern part of Western Australia. The weir was completed in 1903.

The lake created by the dam was known as the Helena River Reservoir, it was renamed as Lake C.Y. O'Connor in 2004.

The owner of the dam, the Water Corporation, refers to the weir as Mundaring Dam on its website, but no other authority, such as Geographic Names, or Geoscience Australia uses this term. The Shire of Mundaring uses an image of the Mundaring Weir in its logo.

Work commenced to raise the dam in the late 1940s, and was completed in November 1951.

In the early 1970s the downstream dam from the weir—the Lower Helena Pumpback Dam—was constructed.

It last overflowed into the Helena Valley in 1996.

== Overflowing ==
In the first fifty years overflows were a regular occurrence.

The 1950s raising of the weir affected overflows, but they continued.

In the 1960s the weir regularly overflowed.

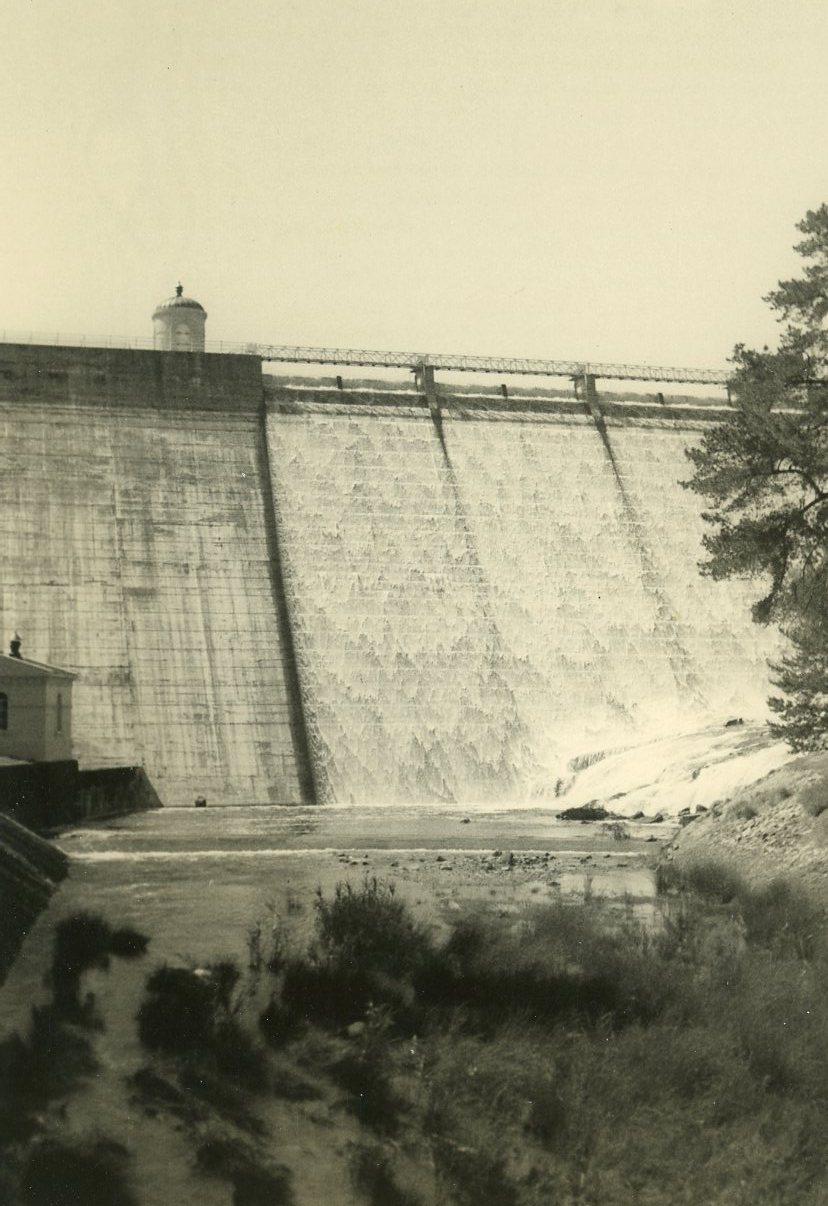
1965

== Dam monitoring ==
Like any structure of its age and design, the weir requires monitoring and repairs and maintenance. On the original structure the central small building was used for aspects of monitoring the weir's internal status – it was rebuilt on the heightening of the dam, although it was no longer used for its original purpose.

In 2009 two face wall entrance points were created on either side (north and south) of the face to facilitate access to the monitoring tunnels. The weir leaks, and the photos below show consistent stain/moisture points between 2008, 2010, 2020 and 2024, where water moves through the structure:

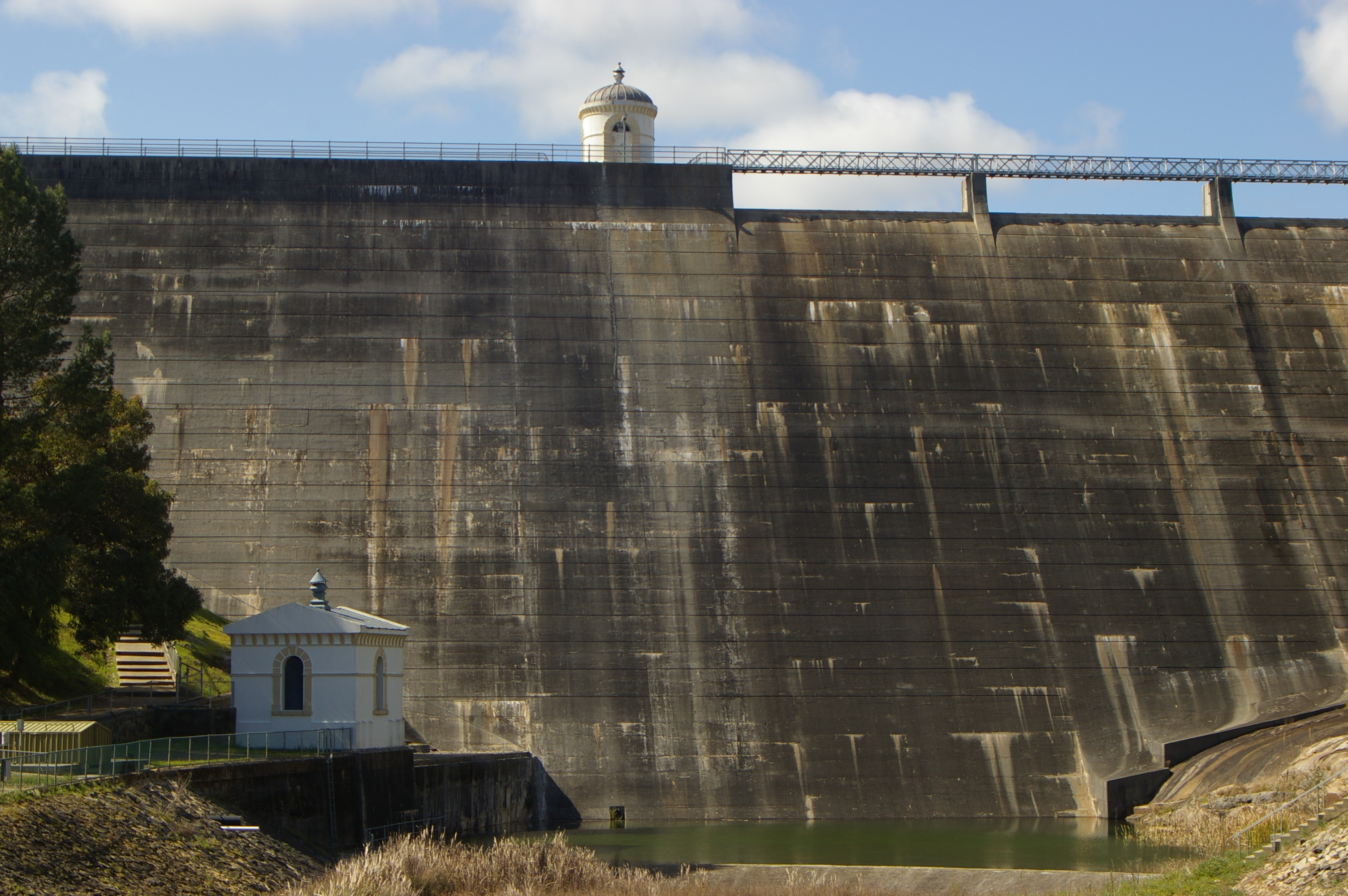
2008

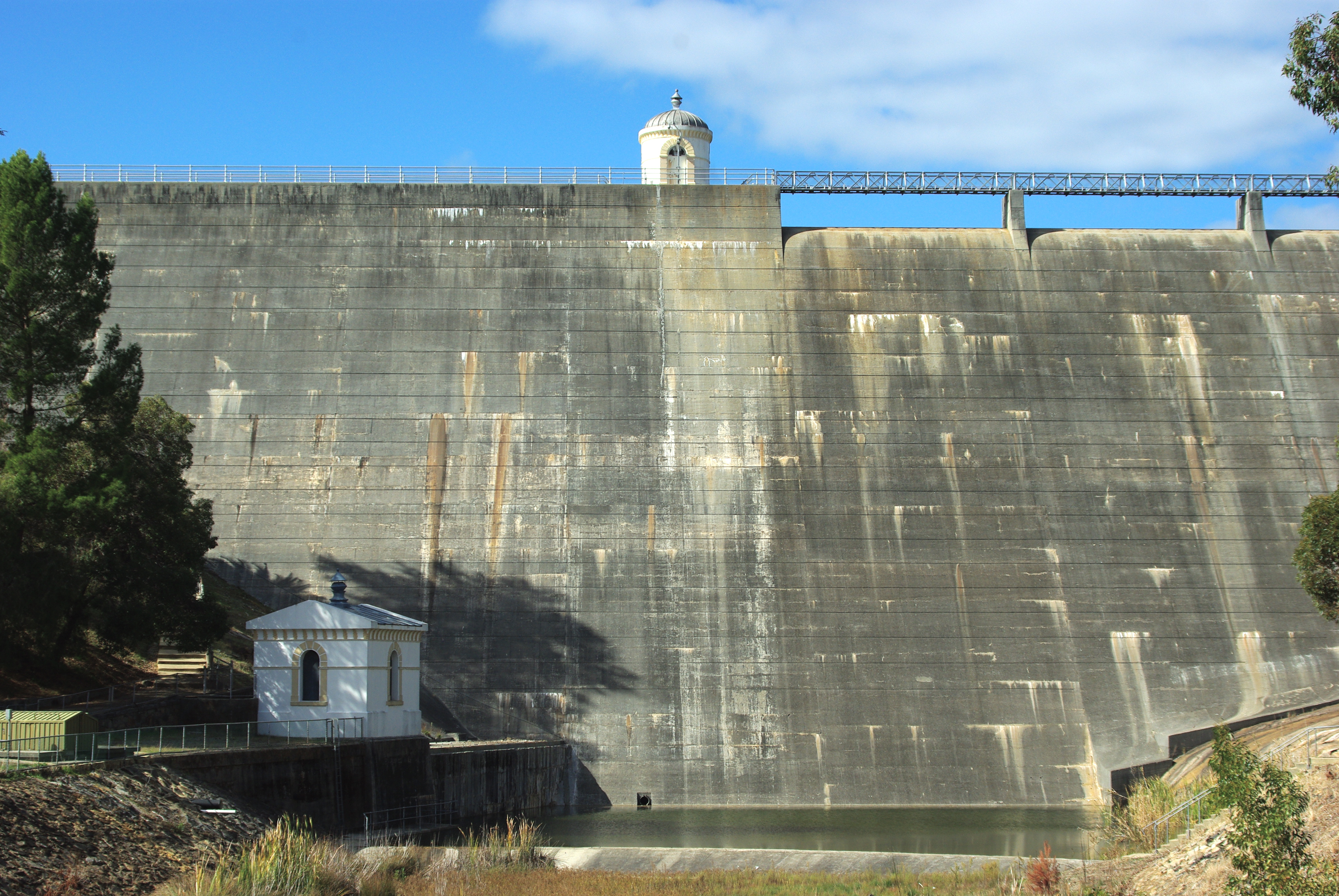
2010

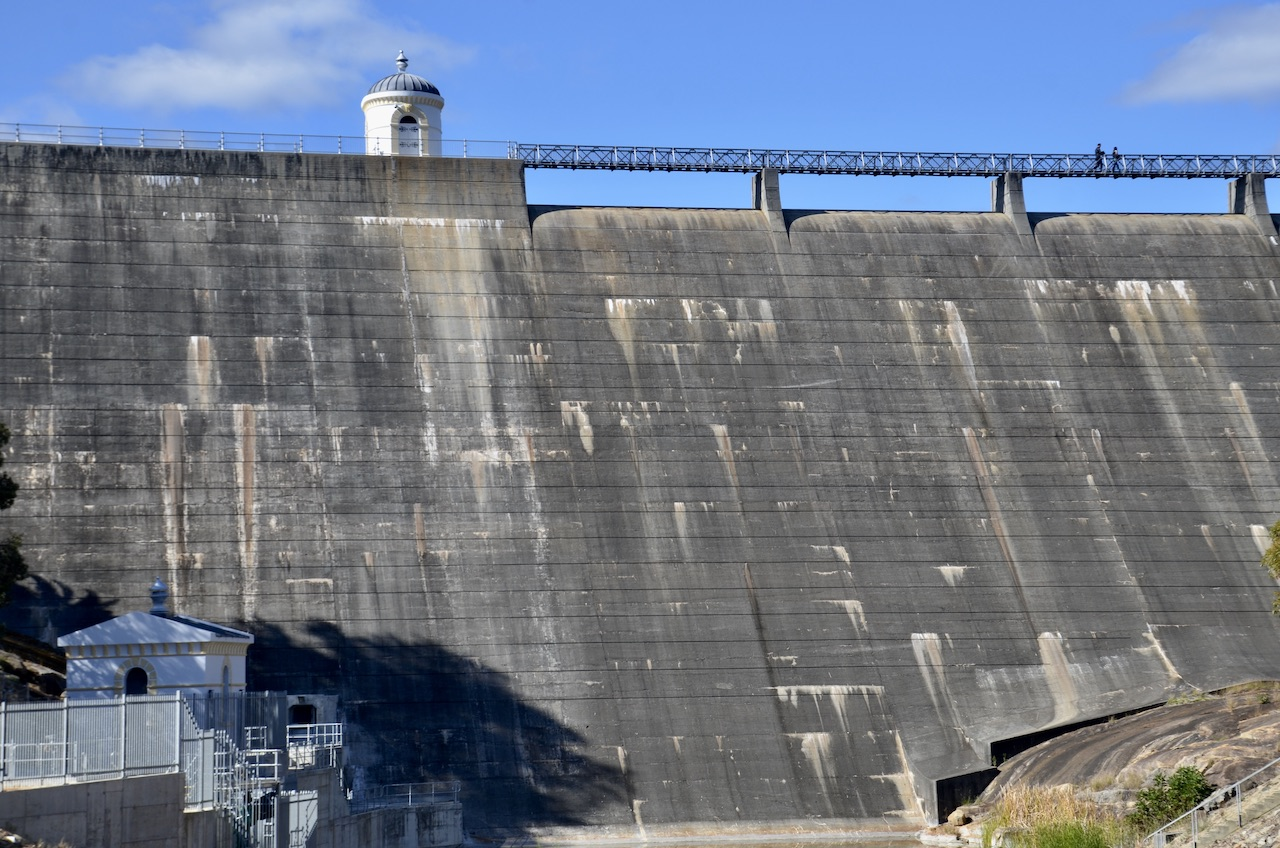
2020

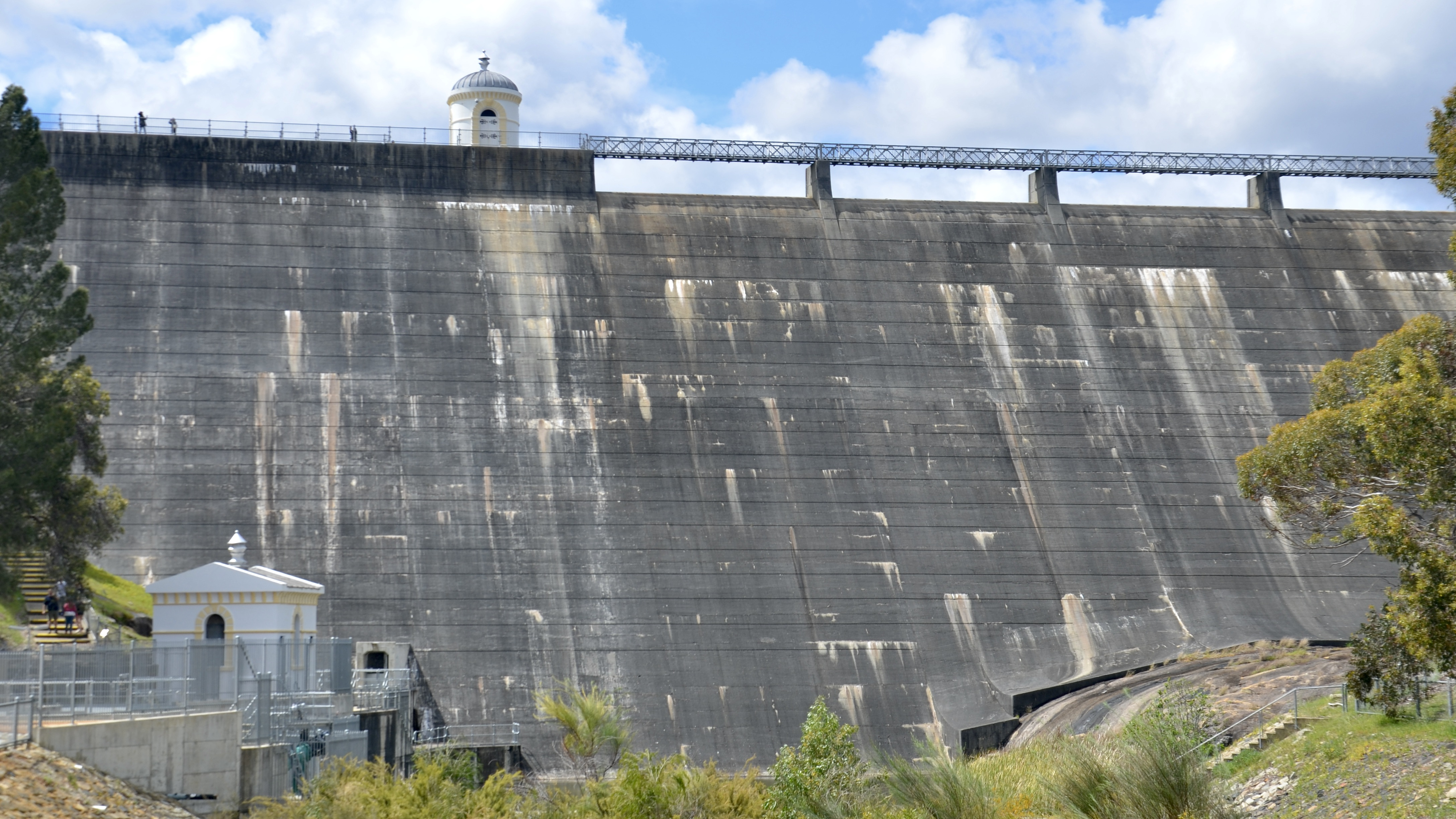
2024

== Changes 2010–2014 ==
A new pump station with an initial capacity of 165,000 cubic metres (5,800,000 cu ft) per day, and an ultimate capacity of 240,000 cubic metres (8,500,000 cu ft) per day, commenced operations in March 2014. The existing two pump stations, a substation and chlorination facility were decommissioned. New treatment facilities included pre-treatment, filtration, chlorination, stabilisation and fluoridation. The old facilities were not able to sustain increasing water demands and current Australian drinking water guidelines. Aesthetic water qualities such as colour, taste and odour had deteriorated over the years.

== Railway ==
Mundaring Weir was the terminus of the Mundaring Weir branch railway, which was originally constructed by the Public Works Department of WA for the transport of materials for the construction of the dam.

It was only after the completion of the weir that the location became popular with picnickers and sightseers, as the project caught the imagination of the public in Perth.

The landscaped grounds of the weir, and the lower zig-zag section of the end of the railway line (which can still be seen when the capacity of the dams falls below approximately 35%) feature prominently in postcards of numerous weekend and special picnic excursion trains that travelled to the weir from the 1910s until the late 1940s.

The steepness of the Mundaring weir railway line restricted the capacity of the railways to conduct the picnic trains, as the Msa Garratt locomotives were the most suitable, but in short supply, at times when the weir was overflowing in the 1940s.

The railway line was closed in 1952.

Additionally, a tramway, using timber rails, was constructed to convey sawn timber from a mill 3 miles (4.8 km) from the site of what is today known as The Dell in Paulls Valley to the weir from where it was railed on the above railway line. It opened in 1909 and closed in 1913.

== Facilities ==
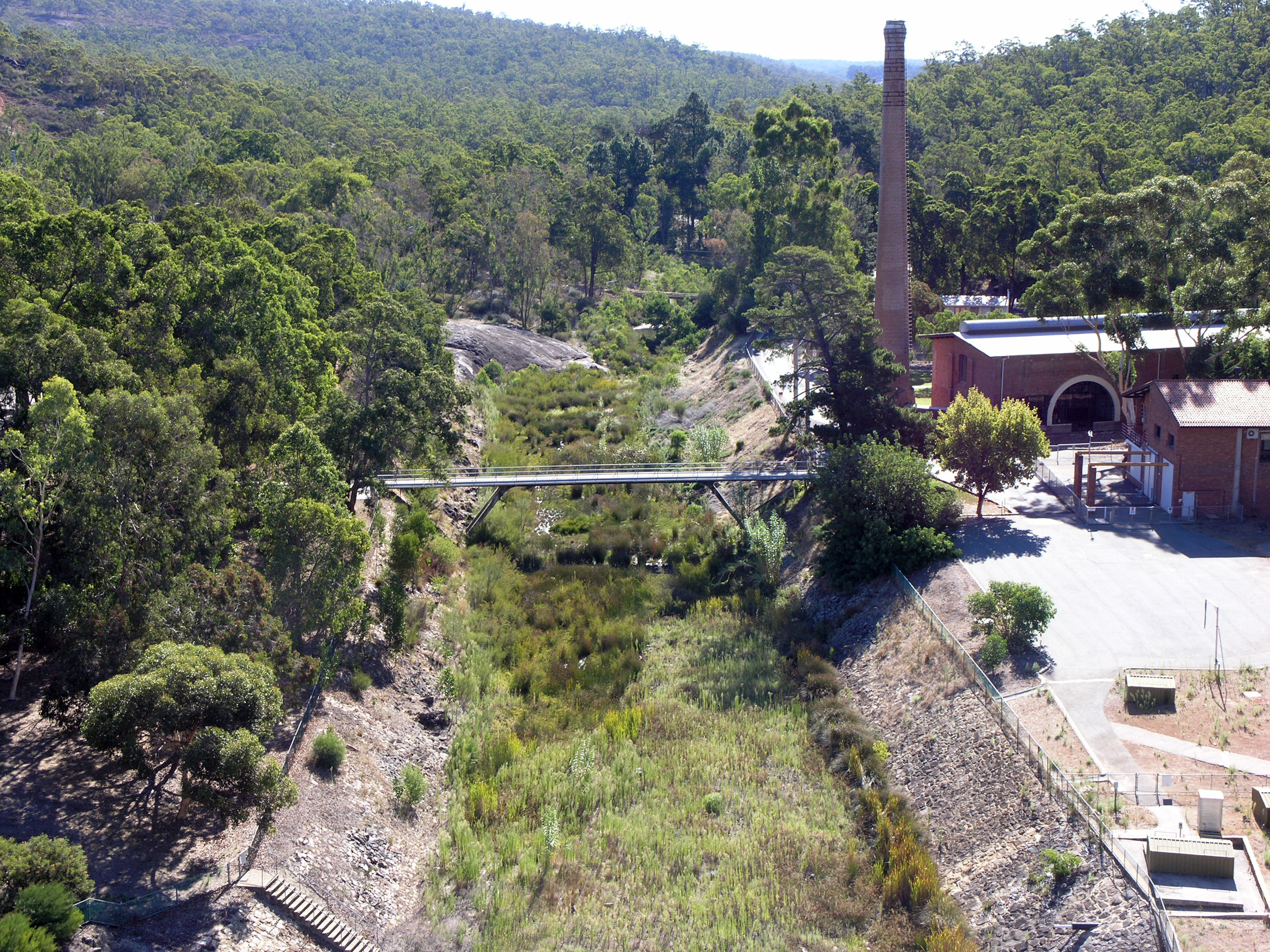
Helena river bed

The old "Pumping Station Number 1" is now the C Y O'Connor Museum run by the National Trust. There is also the Kookaburra outdoor cinema, and the Department of Environment and Conservation has the Hills Forest activity centre, as well as a regional administrative office.

Before rationalisation of its work force at this locality, the Water Authority of Western Australia's operations at the Weir maintained housing for its workers. There is a youth hostel (built at the site of the now defunct primary school), an art gallery in the area, and many picnicking spots. There is still rangers' housing at the site, along with functioning pumping stations and water treatment facilities.

== Bibbulmun Track ==
The 963 kilometres (598 mi) walking trail Bibbulmun Track commences in Kalamunda following Piesse Brook, then along the south side of the Helena valley. Crossing the weir wall the track follows the northern side of C.Y.O'Connor lake before turning south and continuing the journey to Albany.

== Golden Pipeline project ==
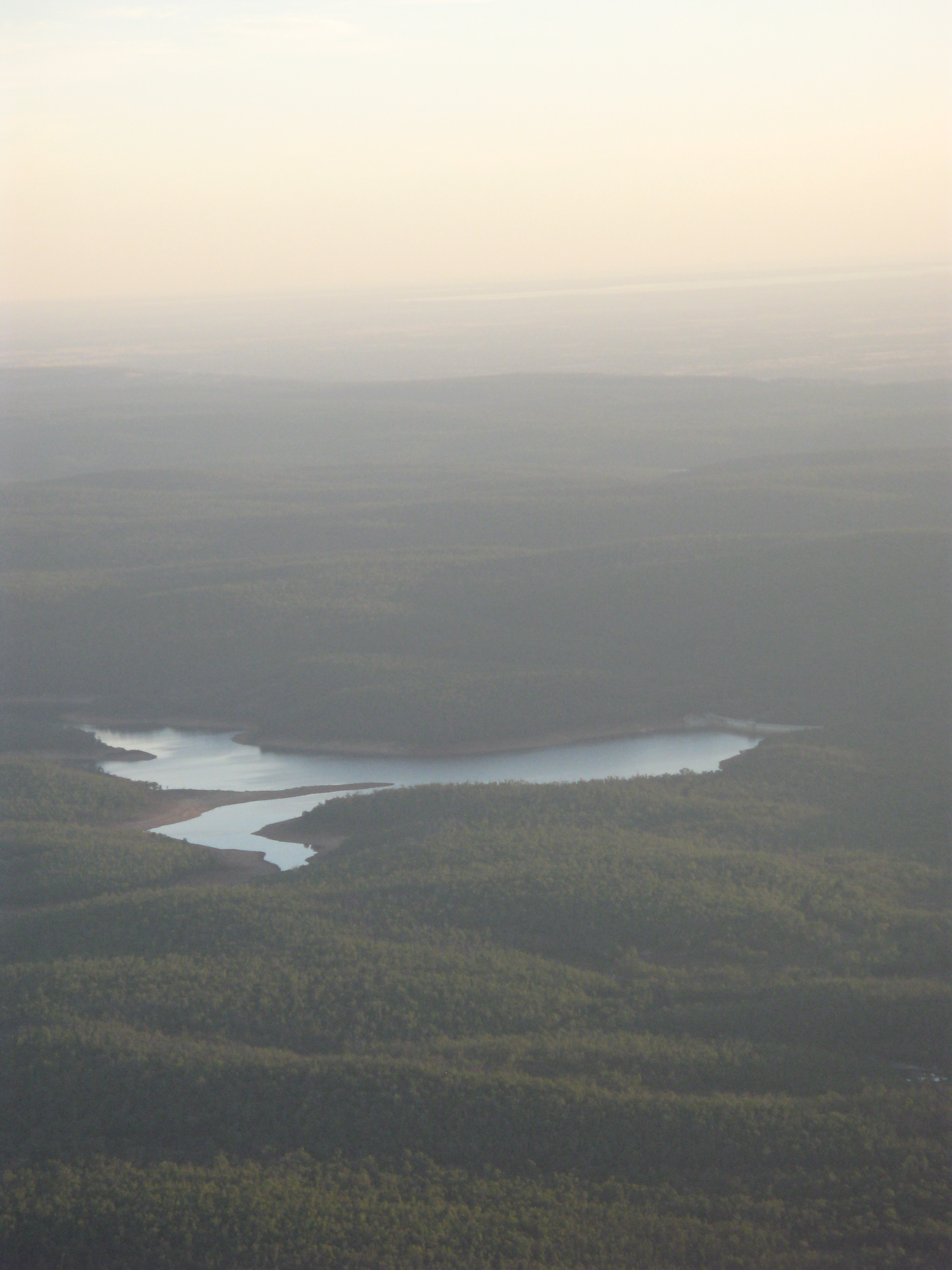
Lake C. Y. O'Connor from the air, looking southwest

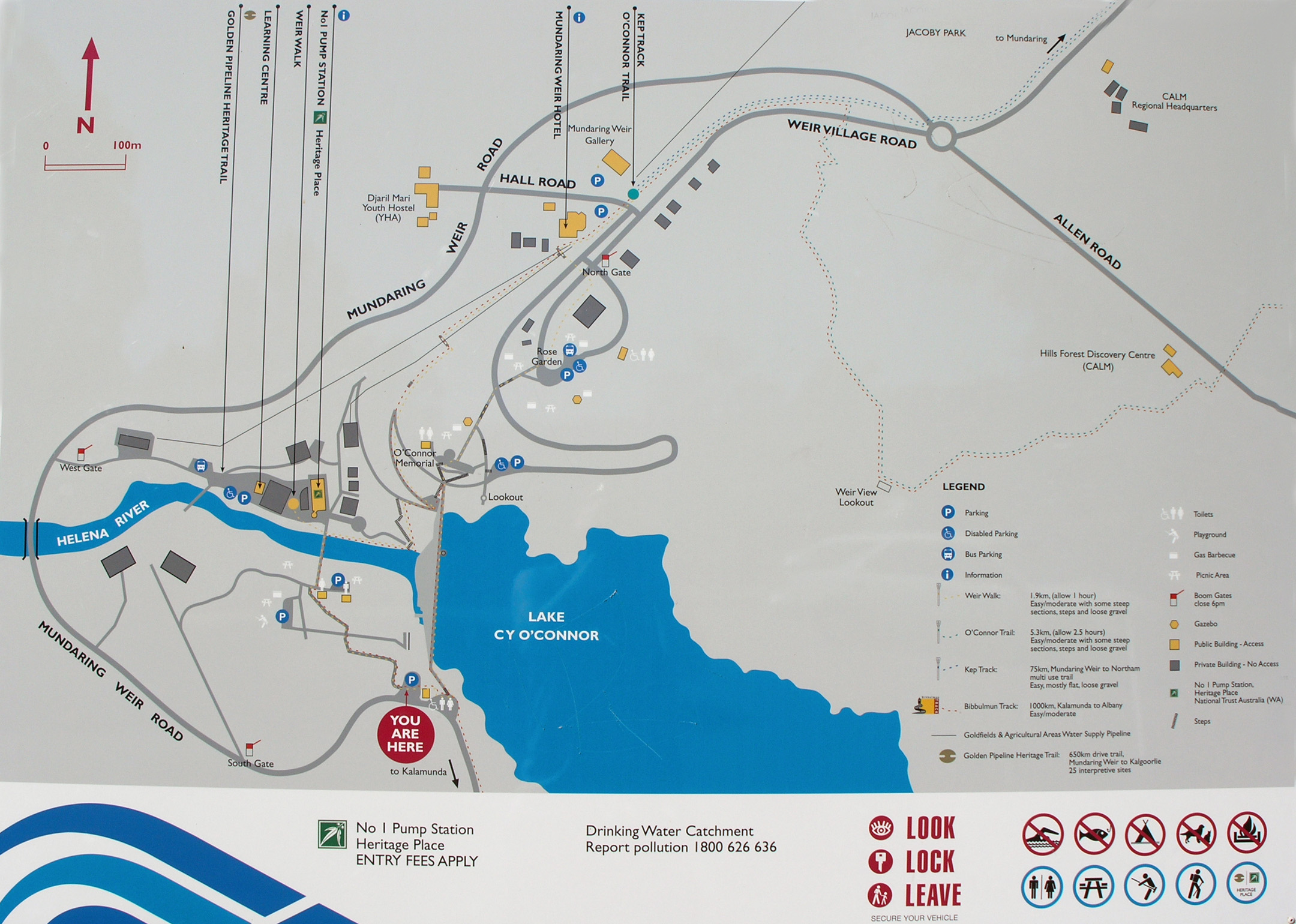
Mundaring Weir information sign

The history and context of the whole Goldfields Water Supply Scheme was celebrated by the Golden Pipeline project, where the Water Corporation had the National Trust of Australia (WA) create an "interpretation" of the history of the scheme with guide books, trails, and web-sites to provide information about the history of the scheme. Most of this project was developed between 2001 and 2003.
