= Eastern Goldfields =

Sub region of Western Australia

The Eastern Goldfields is part of the Western Australian Goldfields in the Goldfields-Esperance region of Western Australia, covering the present and former gold-mining area east of Perth.

== Extent and name origin ==
The region encompasses the towns of Kalgoorlie, Boulder, Coolgardie, Kambalda, Southern Cross and other smaller settlements within this area. The name is derived in two parts: Eastern in relation to its location from Perth, and Goldfields as the name suggests comes from the mining of gold in the region.

== Vegetation and biological survey ==
In the 1980s, a series of surveys were reported for the broader region.

The component areas were designated:

- Lake Johnston - Hyden
- Edjudina - Menzies
- Youanmi - Leonora
- Duketon - Sir Samuel
- Kurnalpi - Kalgoorlie
- Norseman - Balladonia
- Sandston - Sir Samuel and Leonora - Laverton
- Boorabbin - Southern Cross and Barlee - Menzies

== Transport ==
The region was the destination of the long-running Westland overnight railway sleeper train run by Western Australian Government Railways; for decades this was the main means of travelling to the "coast" or metropolitan Perth. The Prospector is now the main railway service into this area.

== Water supply ==
Water to the area is supplied by the Goldfields Water Supply Scheme.

== Literary culture ==
It was the region of inspiration for a group of writers: Gavin Casey, Katharine Susannah Prichard, Henrietta Drake Brockman and others. It has been an important cultural region as far as labour history and Australian political history, with a rich worker and trade union history.

The history of the goldfields region also developed into a significant number of publications over time.

== See also ==
- Eastern Goldfields College
- Ghost towns of the Goldfields of Western Australia
- Kalgoorlie-Boulder Community High School
- Mineral fields of Western Australia
- Eumillipes persephone
