= Electoral district of North Coolgardie =

Former electoral district in Western Australia

North Coolgardie Western Australia—Legislative Assembly
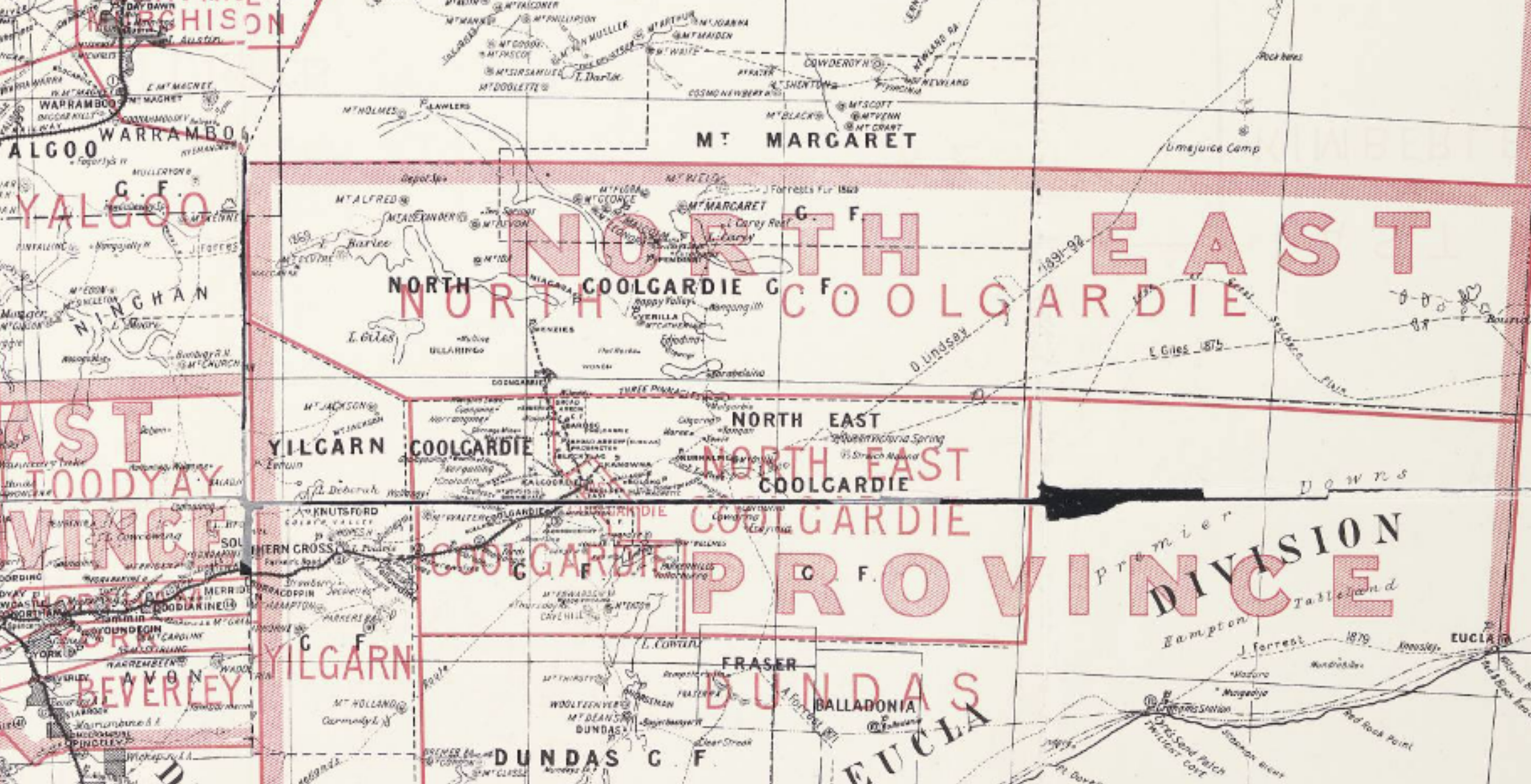
- North Coolgardie and surrounds in 1898
- State: Western Australia
- Dates current: 1897–1901
- Namesake: North Coolgardie Road District

North Coolgardie was an electoral district of the Legislative Assembly in the Australian state of Western Australia from 1897 to 1901.

The district was located in the Western Australian outback. In 1898, it included the settlements of Menzies and Goongarrie along the Menzies–Kalgoorlie railway line, as well as the more remote settlements of Mount Ida, Mount Leonora, Mulline, Niagara, and Yerilla, and the Mount Margaret goldfields. It existed for one term of parliament, and was represented in that time by Henry Gregory. When the district was abolished at the 1901 state election, Gregory transferred to the new seat of Menzies.

== Members for North Coolgardie ==
Member	Party	Term
Henry Gregory	Independent	1897–1901
