= Electoral district of Menzies =

Former state electoral district of Western Australia

Menzies Western Australia—Legislative Assembly
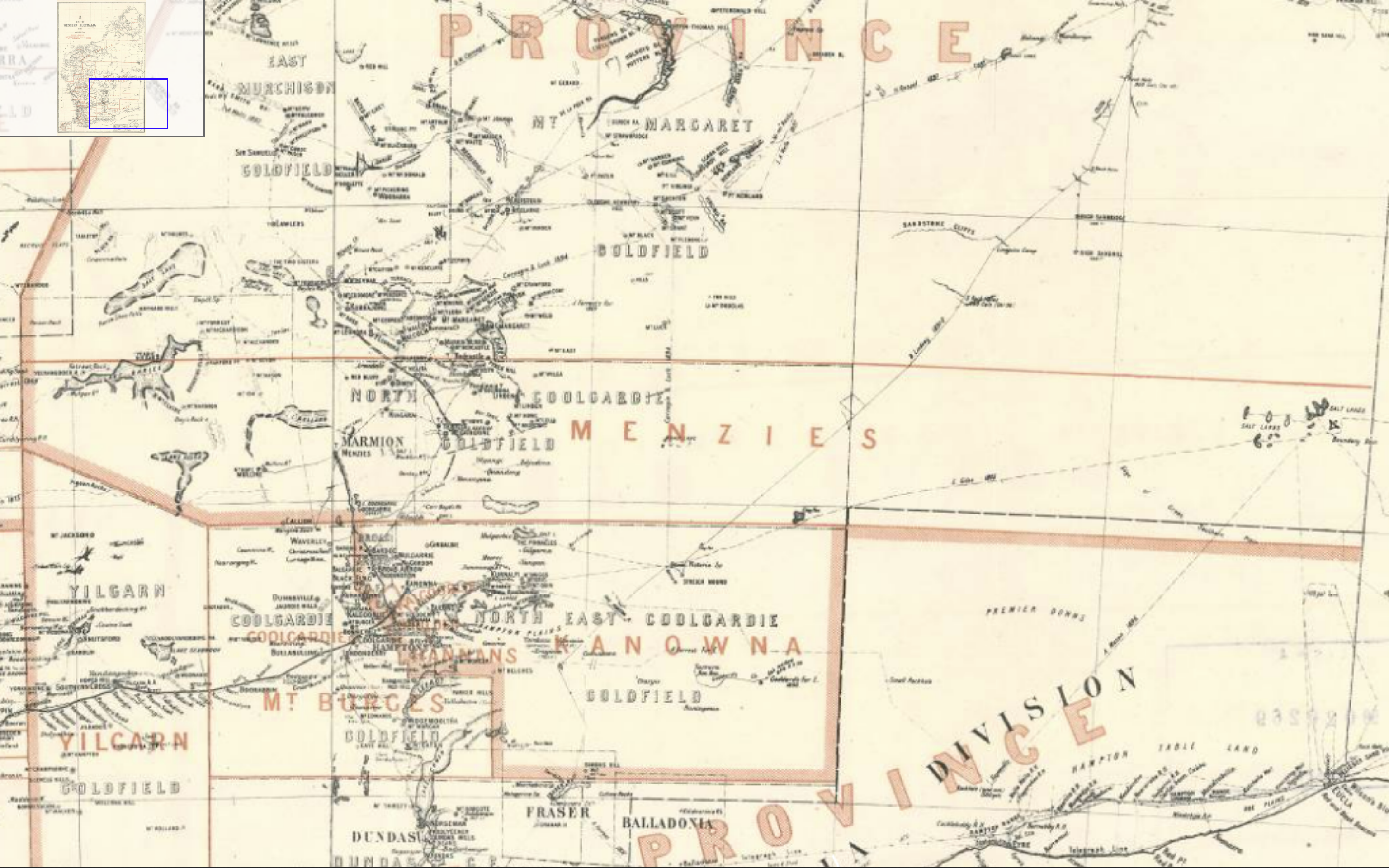
- Menzies and surrounds in 1900
- State: Western Australia
- Dates current: 1901–1930
- Namesake: Menzies

Menzies was an electoral district of the Legislative Assembly in the Australian state of Western Australia from 1901 to 1930.

The district was located in the north of the Eastern Goldfields. On its creation in 1900, it included the towns of Menzies, Goongarrie, Niagara, Yerilla, Tampa, Mount Ida, Mulline, and Callion. When the district was abolished at the 1930 state election, sitting member Alexander Panton transferred to the Perth based seat of Leederville.

== Members for Menzies ==
Members	Party	Term
Henry Gregory	Ministerial	1901–1908
Dick Buzacott	Labor	1908
Henry Gregory	Ministerial	1908–1911
John Mullany	Labor	1911–1917
John Mullany	National Labor	1917–1924
Alexander Panton	Labor	1924–1930
