= List of State Register of Heritage Places in the Shire of Menzies =

The State Register of Heritage Places is maintained by the Heritage Council of Western Australia. As of 2026, 44 places are heritage-listed in the Shire of Menzies, of which 13 are on the State Register of Heritage Places.

== List ==
The Western Australian State Register of Heritage Places, as of 2026, lists the following 13 state registered places within the Shire of Menzies:

Place name	Place #	Street number	Street name	Suburb or town	Co-ordinates	Notes & former names	Photo
Menzies Railway Station Group	1553		Walsh Street	Menzies	29.696202°S 121.031123°E	Julia Mines N.L. Office	
Menzies Post Office (former)	1554	Corner	Shenton & Brown Streets	Menzies	29.69393°S 121.029311°E		
Menzies Warden's Quarters (former)	1555	Lot 891	Mercer Street	Menzies	29.688482°S 121.025307°E	Menzies Hospital (former), Menzies Nursing Post	
Menzies School	1556	72	Walton Street	Menzies	29.689938°S 121.033847°E	Menzies Remote Community School, Primary School & Teacher's Quarters (former)	
Niagara Dam	1557	12 km SE of Kookynie	Kookynie	Menzies	29.40442°S 121.42904°E	Niagra Dam	
Menzies Town Hall & Shire Offices	1559	31	Walsh Street	Menzies	29.694503°S 121.029698°E	Menzies Road Board District Roll of Honour	
Three Railway Cottages, Goongarrie	15411		Goongarrie	Goongarrie Station Railway Siding	30.04952°S 121.161161°E		
Menzies Cemetery	16760		Sandstone Road	Menzies	29.677999°S 121.02275°E		
Station Master's House	23821		Walsh Street	Menzies	29.694255°S 121.03071°E	Part of the Menzies Railway Station Group precinct (1553)	
Menzies Secondary School	23879	Corner	Gregory & Gill Streets	Menzies	29.689938°S 121.033847°E		
Residence	23888	447	Walsh Street	Menzies	29.698418°S 121.030744°E	Fettler's Cottage (former) Part of the Menzies Railway Station Group precinct (1553)	
Residence	23962	445	Walsh Street	Menzies	29.698057°S 121.030739°E	Fettler's Cottage (former) Part of the Menzies Railway Station Group precinct (1553)	
Residence	23968	446	Walsh Street	Menzies	29.698238°S 121.030741°E	Fettler's Cottage (former) Part of the Menzies Railway Station Group precinct (1553)	
