= Electoral results for the district of Menzies =

Western Australian district election results

This is a list of electoral results for the Electoral district of Menzies in Western Australian state elections.

== Members for Menzies ==
Members	Party	Term
Henry Gregory	Ministerial	1901–1911
John Mullany	Labor	1911–1917
John Mullany	National Labor	1917–1924
Alexander Panton	Labor	1924–1930

== Election results ==
=== Elections in the 1920s ===
1927 Western Australian state election: Menzies
Party	Candidate	Votes	%	±%
Labor	Alexander Panton	134	59.8	−0.5
Nationalist	Dick Ardagh	57	25.5	+25.5
Nationalist	Albert Faul	33	14.7	+14.7
Total formal votes		224	98.2	−1.6
Informal votes		4	1.8	+1.6
Turnout		228	86.0	−1.4
Labor hold		Swing	N/A	

- Preferences were not distributed.

1924 Western Australian state election: Menzies
Party	Candidate	Votes	%	±%
Labor	Alexander Panton	254	60.3	+12.3
National Labor	John Mullany	167	39.7	−12.3
Total formal votes		421	99.8	+0.8
Informal votes		1	0.2	−0.8
Turnout		422	87.4	+8.0
Labor gain from National Labor		Swing	+12.3	

1921 Western Australian state election: Menzies
Party	Candidate	Votes	%	±%
National Labor	John Mullany	298	52.0	−10.4
Labor	Edward Gaynor	275	48.0	+10.4
Total formal votes		573	99.0	+0.1
Informal votes		6	1.0	−0.1
Turnout		579	79.4	+2.9
National Labor hold		Swing	−10.4	

=== Elections in the 1910s ===
1917 Western Australian state election: Menzies
Party	Candidate	Votes	%	±%
National Labor	John Mullany	490	62.4	–6.8
Labor	Harold Saunders	295	37.6	+37.6
Total formal votes		785	98.9	–0.3
Informal votes		9	1.1	+0.3
Turnout		794	76.5	+11.6
National Labor hold		Swing	N/A	

- Mullany had run for Labor at the 1914 election.

1914 Western Australian state election: Menzies
Party	Candidate	Votes	%	±%
Labor	John Mullany	600	69.2	+4.3
Liberal	William McMeikan	267	30.8	−4.3
Total formal votes		867	99.2	−0.4
Informal votes		7	0.8	+0.4
Turnout		874	64.9	−22.6
Labor hold		Swing	+4.3	

1911 Western Australian state election: Menzies
Party	Candidate	Votes	%	±%
Labor	John Mullany	941	64.9	
Ministerialist	Henry Gregory	509	35.1	
Total formal votes		1,450	99.6	
Informal votes		6	0.4	
Turnout		1,456	87.5	
Labor gain from Ministerialist		Swing		

=== Elections in the 1900s ===
1908 Menzies state by-election
Party	Candidate	Votes	%	±%
Ministerialist	Henry Gregory	1,322	51.1	+1.2
Labour	Richard Buzacott	1,266	48.9	−1.2
Total formal votes		2,588	99.2	+0.1
Informal votes		21	0.8	−0.1
Turnout		2,609	87.3	+5.2
Ministerialist gain from Labour		Swing	+1.2	

1908 Western Australian state election: Menzies
Party	Candidate	Votes	%	±%
Labour	Richard Buzacott	1,220	50.1	+2.6
Ministerialist	Henry Gregory	1,213	49.9	−2.6
Total formal votes		2,433	99.1	−0.2
Informal votes		23	0.9	+0.2
Turnout		2,456	82.1	+15.0
Labour gain from Ministerialist		Swing	+2.6	

- This result was declared void and was contested again in the 1908 Menzies state by-election.

1905 Western Australian state election: Menzies
Party	Candidate	Votes	%	±%
Ministerialist	Henry Gregory	874	52.5	–6.6
Labour	Richard Buzacott	790	47.5	+6.6
Total formal votes		1,664	99.3	n/a
Informal votes		11	0.7	n/a
Turnout		1,675	67.1	n/a
Ministerialist hold		Swing	–6.6	

1904 Western Australian state election: Menzies
Party	Candidate	Votes	%	±%
Ministerialist	Henry Gregory	1,087	53.0	–47.0
Labour	Richard Buzacott	966	47.0	+47.0
Total formal votes		2,053	99.5	n/a
Informal votes		10	0.5	n/a
Turnout		2,063	55.3	n/a
Ministerialist hold		Swing	–47.0	

1901 Western Australian state election: Menzies
Party	Candidate	Votes	%	±%
Opposition	Henry Gregory	unopposed		
Opposition win		(new seat)		
