= Grevillea secunda =

Conservation status
- Priority Four — Rare Taxa (DEC)

Scientific classification
- Kingdom: Plantae
- Clade: Tracheophytes
- Clade: Angiosperms
- Clade: Eudicots
- Order: Proteales
- Family: Proteaceae
- Genus: Grevillea
- Species: G. secunda

Binomial name
- Grevillea secunda McGill.

Species of shrub endemic to Western Australia

Grevillea secunda is a species of flowering plant in the family Proteaceae and is endemic to inland Western Australia. It is a spreading shrub with divided leaves, the end lobes cylindrical and sharply pointed, and clusters of pinkish-red flowers with a red style arranged on one side of the floral rachis.

== Description ==
Grevillea secunda is a spreading shrub that typically grows to a height of 30–70 cm (12–28 in). Its leaves are 40–95 mm (1.6–3.7 in) long and pinnatipartite usually with 5 to 9 lobes, the lobes usually with 2 to 5 further lobes. The end lobes are more or less cylindrical, 5–40 mm (0.20–1.57 in) long, 0.9–1.3 mm (0.035–0.051 in) wide and sharply pointed. The flowers are borne in clusters on one wide of a rachis 15–80 mm (0.59–3.15 in) long and are pinkish-red with a red style, the pistil 24.5–30 mm (0.96–1.18 in) long. Flowering occurs in September and October, and the fruit is a silky-hairy follicle 10–13 mm (0.39–0.51 in) long.

== Taxonomy ==
Grevillea secunda was first formally described by the botanist Donald McGillivray in 1986 in his book New Names in Grevillea (Proteaceae). The specific epithet (secunda) is a botanical term meaning having flowers or other organs arranged on one side of a branch.

== Distribution ==
This grevillea grows in open woodland or shrubland, on sand dunes or sandplains from Comet Vale to Queen Victoria Spring Nature Reserve and at about 70 km (43 mi) west of Menzies, in the Coolgardie, Great Victoria Desert and Murchison bioregions of inland Western Australia.

== Conservation status ==
Grevillea secunda is classified as "Priority Four" by the Government of Western Australia Department of Biodiversity, Conservation and Attractions, meaning that it is rare or near threatened.

== See also ==
- List of Grevillea species
