= Acacia kalgoorliensis =

Scientific classification
- Kingdom: Plantae
- Clade: Embryophytes
- Clade: Tracheophytes
- Clade: Spermatophytes
- Clade: Angiosperms
- Clade: Eudicots
- Clade: Rosids
- Order: Fabales
- Family: Fabaceae
- Subfamily: Caesalpinioideae
- Clade: Mimosoid clade
- Genus: Acacia
- Species: A. kalgoorliensis

Binomial name
- Acacia kalgoorliensis R.S.Cowan & Maslin
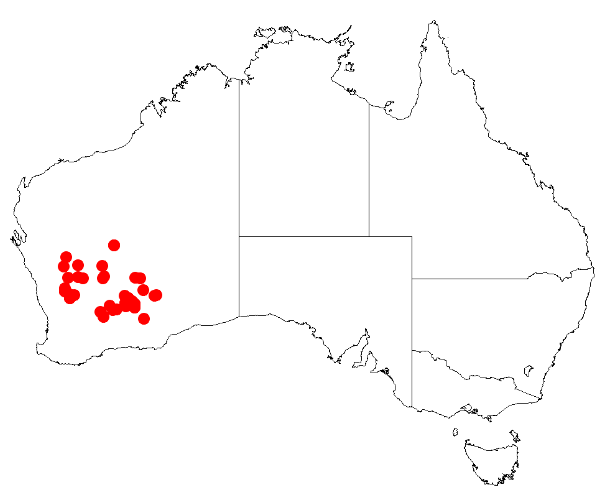
- Occurrence data from AVH

Synonyms
- Racosperma kalgoorliense (R.S.Cowan & Maslin) Pedley

Species of legume

Acacia kalgoorliensis, commonly known as Kalgoorlie wattle, is a species of flowering plant in the family Fabaceae and is endemic to inland areas of the south-west of Western Australia. It is a dense, rounded, many-stemmed shrub with hairy branchlets, erect, straight, terete phyllodes with a sharply pointed tip, spherical heads of golden yellow flowers and linear, papery pods raised over and constricted between the seeds.

== Description ==
Acacia kalgoorliensis is a dense, rounded shrub that typically grows to a height of 1–3 m (3 ft 3 in – 9 ft 10 in) and has many stems, the branchlets with soft white hairs pressed against the surface. The phyllodes are erect, straight, terete, 30–70 mm (1.2–2.8 in) long and about 1.5 mm (0.059 in) in diameter, tapering to a dark, straight, rigid, sharply pointed tip. There are many slightly raised, closely parallel veins on the phyllodes. The flowers are borne in two spherical to elliptic heads 3–6 mm (0.12–0.24 in) in diameter in axils on peduncles usually 0.5–1.5 mm (0.020–0.059 in) in diameter, each head with 15 to 22 golden yellow flowers. Flowering occurs from August to October, and the pods are linear, papery, up to 75 mm (3.0 in) long, 3 mm (0.12 in) wide, shallowly curved and raised over and constricted between the seeds. The seeds are narrowly elliptic to oblong, 4.0–4.5 mm (0.16–0.18 in) long, dull dark brown with an aril on the end.

== Taxonomy ==
Acacia kalgoorliensis was first formally described in 1995 by Richard Cowan and Bruce Maslin in the journal Nuytsia from specimens collected by Maslin 6 km (3.7 mi) north of Broad Arrow towards Menzies in 1971. The specific epithet (kalgoorliensis) means 'native of Kalgoorlie'.

== Distribution and habitat ==
Kalgoorlie wattle grows in rocky loam, clay and clay loam on low hills in woodland near Kalgoorlie and Marvel Loch, with a scattered variant in open woodland and tall shrubland 320–560 km (200–350 mi) north west of Kalgoorlie, in the Avon Wheatbelt, Coolgardie, Great Victoria Desert, Murchison and Yalgoo bioregions of inland south-western Western Australia.

== See also ==
- List of Acacia species
