= Mulwarrie, Western Australia =

Abandoned town in Western Australia

Mulwarrie
- Town
- Coordinates: 29°59′50″S 120°33′13″E
- Country: Australia
- State: Western Australia
- LGA: Shire of Menzies
- Location: 706 km (439 mi) ENE of Perth; 55 km (34 mi) SW of Menzies
- Established: 1900

Government
  - State electorate: Kalgoorlie
  - Federal division: O'Connor
- Elevation: 496 m (1,627 ft)
- Postcode: 6436

Mulwarrie is an abandoned town in the North Coolgardie Goldfield of the Goldfields-Esperance region of Western Australia, 125 km northwest of Kalgoorlie, between Davyhurst and Mulline.

It was originally known as Mount Higgins; gold was first discovered by Paddy Higgins, who later discovered gold at Higginsville. The local progress committee asked for a townsite to be declared in the area in 1900. A survey was completed later the same year and the townsite was gazetted as Mulwarrie on 12 September 1900, named after the principal mine of the area.

The name is thought to be of Aboriginal origin, but is of unknown meaning. It is possible that the mine was named after the Mulwarrie River at Goulburn in the New South Wales goldfields.

About a half mile of main street had houses and businesses spread over the distance. A police presence was established in 1901 when a camp was set up, a station being built later which was then closed in 1905. A temporary telegraph station was also set up in 1901. A school with a single teacher existed in the town in 1903.

In 1901 the Moonshine mine in Mulwarrie crushed 30 tons of ore at the State battery to yield 298oz 10dwt of gold, which was a record return for a government battery.
