= Yunndaga =

Abandoned town in Western Australia

- Town
- Coordinates: 29.747194°S 121.054529°E
- Country: Australia
- State: Western Australia
- LGA: Shire of Menzies
- Location: 718 km (446 mi) ENE of Perth; 7 km (4.3 mi) south of Menzies
- Established: 1904

Government
  - State electorate: Kalgoorlie
  - Federal division: O'Connor
- Elevation: 422 m (1,385 ft)
- Postcode: 6438

Yunndaga is an abandoned town located in the Goldfields-Esperance region in Western Australia, between Kalgoorlie and Leonora along the Goldfields Highway.

In the mid-1890s gold was discovered in the area, and by 1898 a layout for businesses and residences was planned, initially called Woolgar. By 1904 the mining warden sought for the town to be declared. A town named Woolgar already existed in Queensland, so Yunndaga was chosen instead. The town was gazetted in March 1904.

In 1897 when construction of the Kalgoorlie to Menzies railway line commenced a siding was later established in Yunndaga. The narrow gauge line was closed in 1973 and the siding was subsequently demolished.

A Roman Catholic and Methodist church had both been built in the town by 1904.

The Yunndaga hotel was built prior to 1918, and was sold to J. K. Robinson for £3000 at that time.

By 1924, the town was home to several businesses, including the Royal Group Hotel. One of the main mines close to town at the time was the Menzies Consolidated Gold Mine.

In 1936 there were 50 residents living in the town.

The name of the town is Aboriginal in origin and was originally spelt as Yundagar. The meaning of the name is not known.
