= Calytrix breviseta =

Scientific classification
- Kingdom: Plantae
- Clade: Tracheophytes
- Clade: Angiosperms
- Clade: Eudicots
- Clade: Rosids
- Order: Myrtales
- Family: Myrtaceae
- Genus: Calytrix
- Species: C. breviseta

Binomial name
- Calytrix breviseta Lindl.

Species of flowering plant

Calytrix breviseta is a species of flowering plant in the myrtle family Myrtaceae and is endemic to the south-west of Western Australia. It is a more or less glabrous shrub with egg-shaped, elliptic, lanceolate, oblong or linear leaves and clusters of purple flowers with about 25 to 65 white stamens in several rows, becoming reddish-purple as they age.

== Description ==
Calytrix breviseta is a glabrous shrub that typically grows to a height of up to 0.2–1 m (7.9 in – 3 ft 3.4 in). Its leaves are egg-shaped, elliptic, lanceolate, oblong or linear, 1.5–9 mm (0.059–0.354 in) long, 0.1–0.8 mm (0.0039–0.0315 in) wide on a petiole 0.1–0.8 mm (0.0039–0.0315 in) long. There are stipules up to 1.5 mm (0.059 in) long at the base of the petioles. The floral tube is 6.5–13 mm (0.26–0.51 in) long, fused to the style and has 10 ribs. The sepals are joined for up to 0.75 mm (0.030 in) at the base, the lobes egg-shaped to more or less round, 1.2–2.5 mm (0.047–0.098 in) long and 1.5–2.8 mm (0.059–0.110 in) wide with an awn up to 13 mm (0.51 in) long. The petals are purple with a white base, elliptic, lance-shaped or egg-shaped, 4.5–10 mm (0.18–0.39 in) long and 2.0–3.8 mm (0.079–0.150 in) wide with about 25 to 65 white stamens in 2 or 4 rows, becoming reddish-purple as they age. Flowering period depends on subspecies.

== Taxonomy ==
Calytrix breviseta was first formally described in 1839 by John Lindley in A Sketch of the Vegetation of the Swan River Colony. The specific epithet (breviseta) means 'short bristle'.

In 1987, Lyndley Craven reduced Calytrix stipulosa W.Fitzg. to subspecies Calytrix breviseta subsp. stipulosa in the journal Brunonia, and that name, and the name of the autonym are accepted by the Australian Plant Census:

- Calytrix breviseta Lindl. subsp. breviseta (the autonym) has leaves 2–9 mm (0.079–0.354 in) long, 0.5–1.25 mm (0.020–0.049 in) wide on a petiole 0.1–0.75 m (3.9 in – 2 ft 5.5 in) long, with stipules up to 1.25 mm (0.049 in) long. The hypanthium is 6.5–10 mm (0.26–0.39 in) long, the sepal blades are 1.75–2.5 mm (0.069–0.098 in) long and 2.0–2.8 mm (0.079–0.110 in) wide with an awn to 11 mm (0.43 in) long and there are 40 to 65 stamens. Flowering occurs in October and November.
- Calytrix breviseta subsp. stipulosa (W.Fitzg.) Craven has leaves 1.5–5.5 mm (0.059–0.217 in) long and 0.6–1.5 mm (0.024–0.059 in) wide, sometimes 1.5–5.5 mm (0.059–0.217 in) long and 0.6–1.5 mm (0.024–0.059 in) long. The petiole is 0.25–0.8 mm (0.0098–0.0315 in) long with stipules up to 1.5 mm (0.059 in) long. The hypanthium is 7–13 mm (0.28–0.51 in) long, the sepal blades are 1.2–2.0 mm (0.047–0.079 in) long and 1.5–2.3 mm (0.059–0.091 in) wide with an awn to 13 mm (0.51 in) long and there are 25 to 40 stamens. Flowering occurs from August to October.

== Distribution and habitat ==
This species of Calytrix is found on swampy flats in the Avon Wheatbelt, Coolgardie, Esperance Plains, Jarrah Forest, Mallee, Murchison and Swan Coastal Plain bioregions.

Subspecies breviseta is only known from the Perth district on the western side of the Darling Scarp in the Swan Coastal Plain bioregion, but subsp. stipulosa is widely distributed between the Northam–Kojonup districts to the Comet Vale–Lake King districts.

== Conservation status ==
Subspecies stipulosa is listed as "not threatened" by the Government of Western Australia Department of Biodiversity, Conservation and Attractions, but subsp. breviseta is listed as "threatened" and an Interim Recovery Plan has been prepared.
