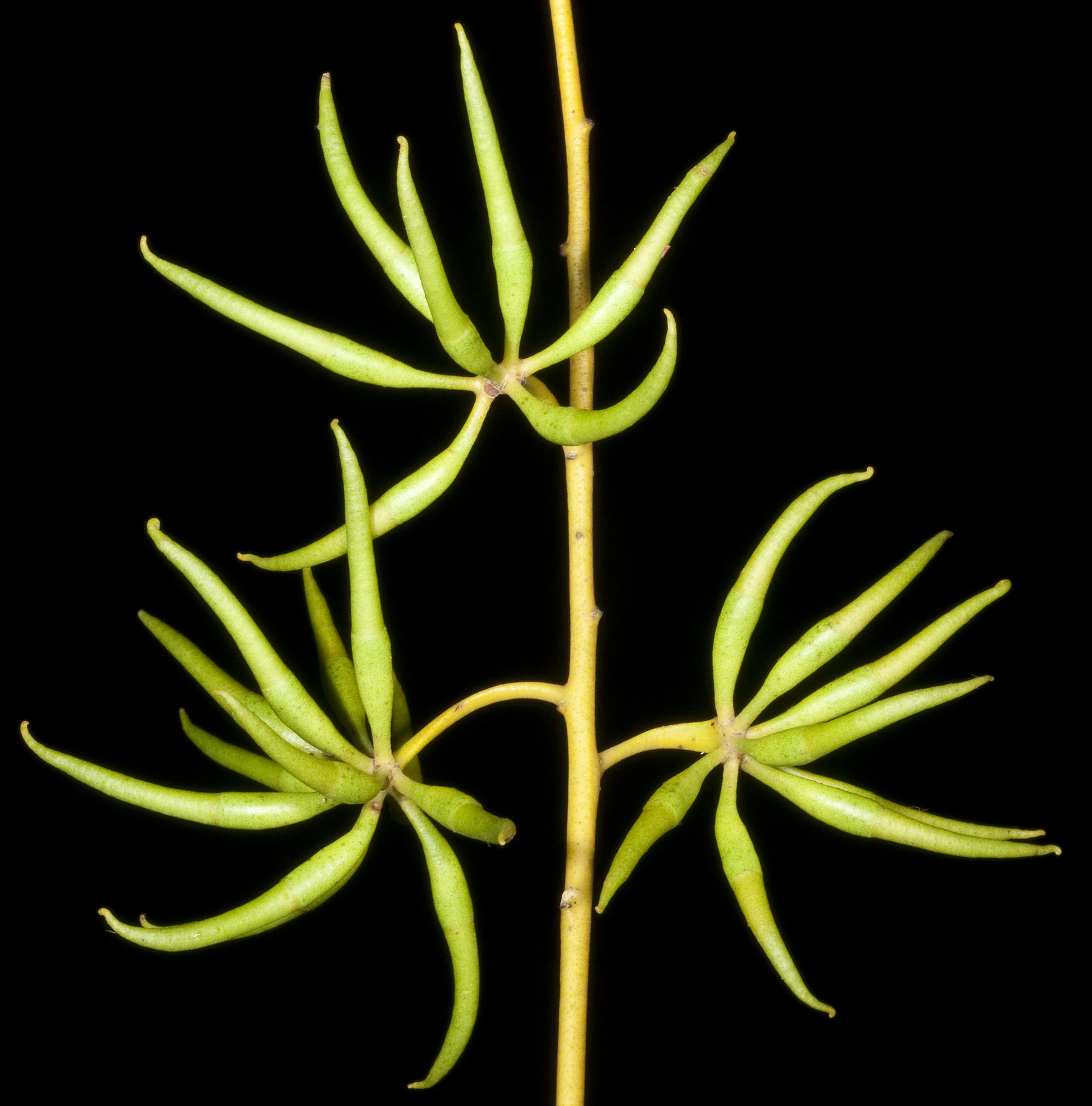
- E. flavida flower buds

Scientific classification
- Kingdom: Plantae
- Clade: Embryophytes
- Clade: Tracheophytes
- Clade: Spermatophytes
- Clade: Angiosperms
- Clade: Eudicots
- Clade: Rosids
- Order: Myrtales
- Family: Myrtaceae
- Genus: Eucalyptus
- Species: E. flavida

Binomial name
- Eucalyptus flavida Brooker & Hopper

Synonyms
- Eucalyptus redunce var. oxymitra Maiden

= Eucalyptus flavida =

Yellow-flowered mallee

Species of eucalyptus

Eucalyptus flavida, commonly known as yellow-flowered mallee, is a species of mallee that is endemic to Western Australia. It has smooth greyish bark, sometimes with rough, flaking brownish bark at the base, lance-shaped adult leaves, long, elongated, tapering flower buds in groups of nine or eleven, yellow flowers and cylindrical or barrel-shaped fruit.

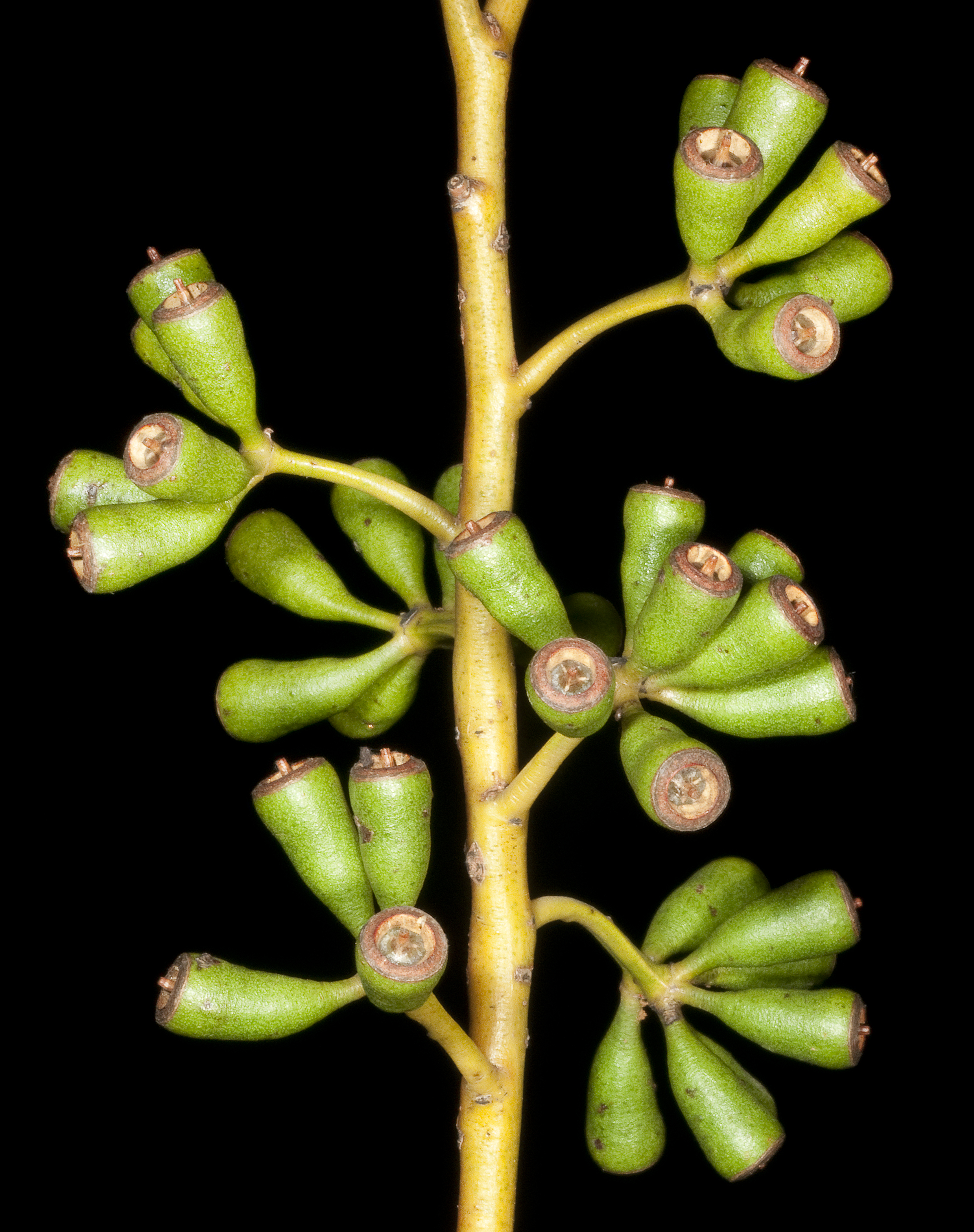
Immature fruit

== Description ==
Eucalyptus flavida is a mallee that typically grows to a height of 5–15 m (16–49 ft) and forms a lignotuber. It has smooth, greyish bark, sometimes with rough, flaky brown bark at the base of the trunk. The adult leaves are lance-shaped, the same slightly glossy light green on both sides, 65–110 mm (2.6–4.3 in) long and 9–15 mm (0.35–0.59 in) wide on a petiole 8–23 mm (0.31–0.91 in) long. The flower buds are arranged in leaf axils in groups of nine or eleven on an unbranched peduncle 10–20 mm (0.39–0.79 in) long, the individual buds on pedicels 2–3 mm (0.079–0.118 in) long. Mature buds are elongated spindle-shaped, 23–29 mm (0.91–1.14 in) long and 3–5 mm (0.12–0.20 in) wide with a conical operculum up to three times as long as the floral cup. Flowering occurs in November and December and the flowers are yellow. The fruit is a woody cylindrical or barrel-shaped capsule 10–11 mm (0.39–0.43 in) long and 5–6 mm (0.20–0.24 in) wide.

== Taxonomy and naming ==
Eucalyptus flavida was first formally described by the botanists Ian Brooker and Stephen Hopper in 1991 in the journal Nuytsia from a specimen collected near Broad Arrow by Richard Helms in 1899. The specific epithet (flavida) is from the Latin word meaning "yellowish", referring to the colour of the flowers.

== Distribution and habitat ==
The yellow-flowered mallee is found among granite breakaways in the north and east of Kalgoorlie in the Coolgardie and Murchison biogeographic regions of Western Australia where it grows in red loamy soils with quartz or calcrete.

== See also ==
- List of Eucalyptus species
