= Davyhurst =

Davyhurst may refer to:

- Davyhurst, Western Australia
- Davyhurst Gold Mine, a gold mine in Western Australia
