= Grevillea eremophila =

Conservation status
- Least Concern (IUCN 3.1)

Scientific classification
- Kingdom: Plantae
- Clade: Embryophytes
- Clade: Tracheophytes
- Clade: Spermatophytes
- Clade: Angiosperms
- Clade: Eudicots
- Order: Proteales
- Family: Proteaceae
- Genus: Grevillea
- Species: G. eremophila

Binomial name
- Grevillea eremophila (Diels) Olde & Marriott

Synonyms
- Grevillea integrifolia subsp. ceratocarpa 'subsericeous form'; Grevillea integrifolia var. eremophila Diels; Grevillea integrifolia var. grandiflora S.Moore

Species of shrub endemic to Western Australia

Grevillea eremophila is a species of flowering plant in the family Proteaceae and is endemic to the south-west of Western Australia. It is an erect shrub with leathery, linear to narrowly egg-shaped leaves with the narrower end towards the base, and creamy-white flowers.

== Description ==
Grevillea eremophila is an erect shrub that typically grows to a height of 1.5–3 m (4 ft 11 in – 9 ft 10 in), its branchlets covered with silky hairs. Its leaves are leathery, linear to narrowly egg-shaped with the narrower end towards the base, 60–160 mm (2.4–6.3 in) long, 1–5 mm (0.039–0.197 in) wide and sessile with three to nine longitudinal ridges. The flowers are arranged in erect, cylindrical groups 70–150 mm (2.8–5.9 in) long on, or near the ends of branches. The flowers are creamy-white and glabrous, the pistil 7.5–10 mm (0.30–0.39 in) long. Flowering occurs from late September to November and the fruit is a smooth, oval or cylindrical follicle 12–18 mm (0.47–0.71 in) long.

== Taxonomy ==
Grevillea eremophila was first formally described in 1904 by Ludwig Diels, who gave it the name Grevillea integrifolia var. eremophila in Botanische Jahrbücher für Systematik, Pflanzengeschichte und Pflanzengeographie. In 1994, Peter M. Olde and Neil R. Marriott raised the variety to species status as Grevillea eremophila in The Grevillea Book. The specific epithet (eremophila) means "solitary-loving".

== Distribution and habitat ==
This grevillea grows on sandplains and heathlands, mainly between Comet Vale, Beacon and Narembeen in the Avon Wheatbelt, Coolgardie, Mallee, Murchison and Yalgoo biogeographic regions of south-western Western Australia.

== Conservation status ==
Grevillea eremophila is listed as least concern on the IUCN Red List of Threatened Species and as not threatened under the Biodiversity Conservation Act 2016 of Western Australia. It has a wide distribution, a stable population and its threats are currently not severe enough to warrant a threatened or near-threatened category. There was significant habitat clearing within the species' distribution in the past for agriculture which caused rapid declines, though this no longer occurs. Competition with invasive weeds is considered to be a threat at present. Reduced fire frequency may also pose a threat to this species, though additional information is required to confirm this. The species is distributed within some protected areas and no additional conservation measures are required at present.

== See also ==
- List of Grevillea species
