= Yerilla Station =

Pastoral lease in Western Australia

Coordinates: 29°28′17″S 121°49′36″E

Location in Western Australia

Yerilla Station is a pastoral lease that currently operates as a cattle station but has previously operated as a sheep station.

It is located about 36 kilometres (22 mi) south east of Kookynie and 160 kilometres (99 mi) north of Kalgoorlie in the Goldfields-Esperance region of Western Australia. The property occupies an area of 101,171 hectares (250,000 acres) and caters for pastoralism. The homestead and four other houses provide a tennis court and swimming pool. The property is able to carry 10,000 sheep or 1,400 head of cattle and is watered by a quality underwater supply.

The abandoned former mining town of Yerilla is situated within the station boundaries. The company, Yerilla Station Limited, was registered in 1923 with capital of £20,000. The company was composed of Percy Robinson, Duncan Robinson, William Padbury and Charles Seabrook, and purchased the station from C. W. Marsh in 1925. At the time Yerilla occupied an area of 121,406 hectares (300,000 acres) and was sold with 400 head of cattle. The new owners installed new fencing and switched from raising cattle to raising sheep for the purpose of producing wool. 2,000 ewes were introduced to the property, which was thought to have a carrying capacity of about 10,000.

== See also ==
- List of ranches and stations
