= Richard Buzacott =

Australian politician

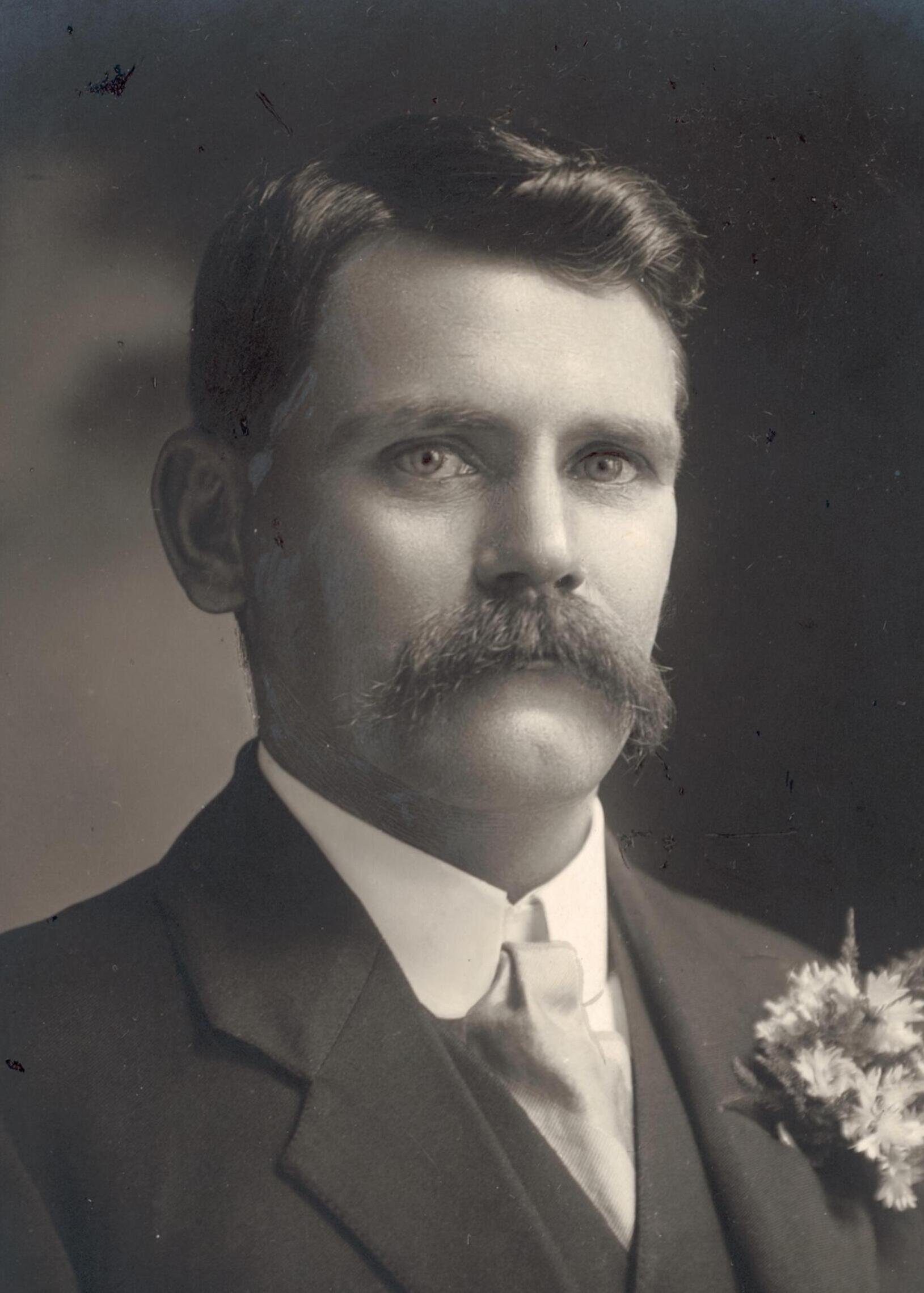

Senator for Western Australia
- In office 1 July 1910 – 30 June 1923

Member of the Western Australian Legislative Assembly
- In office 11 September 1908 – 2 November 1908
- Preceded by: Henry Gregory
- Succeeded by: Henry Gregory
- Constituency: Menzies

Personal details
- Born: 7 September 1867 Clare, South Australia, Australia
- Died: 10 January 1933 (aged 65) Balwyn, Victoria, Australia
- Party: Labor (1910–17); Nationalist (1917–23)
- Spouse: Mary Lucy Marshall
- Occupation: Miner

Richard Buzacott (7 September 1867 – 10 January 1933) was an Australian politician. He was a Senator for Western Australia from 1910 to 1923, having earlier served briefly in the Western Australian Legislative Assembly in 1908. He began his career in the Australian Labor Party (ALP) but defected to the Nationalist Party following the 1916 ALP split.

== Early life ==
Buzacott was born at Emu Flat, Clare, South Australia on 7 September 1867. The son of a farmer of the same name, he was educated at Stanley Flat Primary School, and Clare High School, then worked as an agricultural labourer. From 1891 to 1898 he was a miner at Broken Hill, New South Wales, and from 1899 to 1900 he was in Queensland.

== Early years in Western Australia ==
In 1900 Buzacott migrated to the Western Australian goldfields, mining on the Goongarrie fields near Menzies. He became active in the Labor movement, becoming president of the Menzies branch of the Amalgamated Workers' Union in 1901, and of the Amalgamated Miners' Association in 1903. From 1904 he was President of the Australian Labor Federation. In the elections of 28 June 1904 and 27 October 1905, he contested the Western Australian Legislative Assembly seat of Menzies as a Labor candidate, but was defeated on both occasions by the incumbent Henry Gregory. From 1906 to 1907 he was secretary of the Menzies Miners' Institute.

On 31 March 1908, Richard Buzacott married Mary Lucy Marshall. They had one son, Richard Norman Buzacott.

On 11 September 1908, Buzacott defeated Gregory for the seat of Menzies in a general election. Gregory then disputed the result with the Court of Disputed Returns, retaining his seat while the matter was under its consideration. Ultimately, the election was declared void, and a by-election was held on 20 November, which Gregory won by 56 votes.

== Senate ==
On 13 April 1910, Buzacott was elected to the Australian Senate on a Labor ticket. He took his seat on 1 July, serving as a Labor member until the conscription crisis of 1917, when he was expelled from the party as a pro-conscriptionist, and joined the Nationalists. Over the next five years he served as a member of the Federal Parliamentary Recruiting Committee to Inquire into the Effect of Liquor on Australian Soldiers (1917–18); the Joint Committee of Public Accounts (1920–22); and the Royal Commission on War Service Homes (1922). He retained his seat until 30 June 1923, having lost it in the election of 14 December the previous year.

== Personal life ==
Buzacott lived in Melbourne from around 1912. Very little is known of his life after politics.

His wife died on 10 January 1976 aged 88, and he had pre-deceased her at Balwyn, Victoria, on 10 January 1933 aged 65.

One of Richard Buzacott's brothers Nicholas was a Member of the New South Wales Legislative Council from 1899 to 1933. Another brother, Roderick Buzacott was a major South Australian Farm Implement Manufacturer in the town of Blyth, located near Clare, where they were born and raised.Another brother, Alexander Herbert Stanley Buzacott also went to Western Australia (Kalgoorlie and then Perth)- some of his descendants have now returned to Adelaide, South Australia
