= Tampa, Western Australia =

Abandoned town in Western Australia

Tampa Western Australia
- Coordinates: 29°17′21″S 121°28′47″E
- Established: 1897
- Postcode(s): 6438
- Elevation: 416 m (1,365 ft)
- Location: 805 km (500 mi) ENE of Perth; 55 km (34 mi) south of Leonora
- LGA(s): Shire of Menzies
- State electorate(s): Kalgoorlie
- Federal division(s): O'Connor

Tampa is an abandoned town located in the Goldfields-Esperance region in Western Australia. It is found between Kookynie and Leonora.

In the late 1890s gold was discovered in the area and by 1896 the government succumbed to demands to survey lots for a townsite. The townsite was gazetted in 1897.

It is thought that the town is named after Tampa in the United States; likewise the neighbouring town of Niagara is thought to be named after its American namesake.
