= List of acts of the Parliament of Western Australia from 1899 =

This is a list of acts of the Parliament of Western Australia for the year 1899.

== 1899 ==
=== Public acts ===
Short title, or popular name	Citation	Royal assent
Long title
	63 Vict. No. 1	2 August 1899
An Act to apply out of the Consolidated Revenue Fund and from Moneys to Credit of the General Loan Fund the sum of Eight Hundred and Fifty Thousand Pounds (Note: £850,000 in 1899 is equivalent to A$153,200,000 in 2022.) to the Service of the Year ending 30th June, 1900.
	63 Vict. No. 2	2 August 1899
An Act to amend the Perth Mint Act, 1895. (Note: Perth Mint Act 1895 (59 Vict. No. 12))
Public Education Act 1899	63 Vict. No. 3	5 October 1899
An Act to amend the Law relating to Public Elementary Education.
Sale of Liquors Amendment Act 1899	63 Vict. No. 4	5 October 1899
An Act to amend the Sale of Liquors Amendment Act, 1897, (Note: Sale of Liquors Amendment Act 1897 (61 Vict. No. 25)) and for other purposes.
Municipal Loans Validation Act 1899	63 Vict. No. 5	5 October 1899
An Act to amend the Municipal Institutions Act, 1895, (Note: Municipal Institutions Act 1895 (59 Vict. No. 10)) and to validate certain Municipal Loans.
Companies Duty Act 1899	63 Vict. No. 6	5 October 1899
An Act to impose Duties in respect of Dividends or Profits of Incorporated Companies.
Supreme Court Criminal Sittings Act 1899	63 Vict. No. 7	9 October 1899
An Act for the more speedy Trial of Accused Persons.
Criminal Evidence Act 1899	63 Vict. No. 8	9 October 1899
An Act to amend the Law of Evidence in Criminal Cases.
Evidence Act 1899	63 Vict. No. 9	9 October 1899
An Act to facilitate the Proof of Acts of the Parliaments of Australasian Colonies and of Judicial and Official Documents, Seals, and Signatures, and for other purposes.
Contagious Diseases (Bees) Act 1899	63 Vict. No. 10	9 October 1899
An Act for the Eradication of Contagious Diseases among Bees.
Weights and Measures Act 1899	63 Vict. No. 11	9 October 1899
An Act for the Regulation of Weights and Measures.
Dog Act Amendment Act 1899	63 Vict. No. 12	9 October 1899
An Act to further amend the Dog Act, 1883. (Note: Dog Act 1883 (47 Vict. No. 13))
Customs Consolidation Act Amendment Act 1899	63 Vict. No. 13	9 October 1899
An Act to amend the Customs Consolidation Act, 1892. (Note: Customs Consolidation Act 1892 (55 Vict. No. 31))
	63 Vict. No. 14	9 October 1899
An Act to amend the Insect Pests Amendment Act, 1898. (Note: Insect Pests Amendment Act 1898 (62 Vict. No. 27))
Truck Act 1899	63 Vict. No. 15	9 October 1899
An Act to prohibit the Payment of Wages in Goods or otherwise than in Money.
	63 Vict. No. 16	9 October 1899
An Act to confirm certain Expenditure for the year ending 30th June, One thousand eight hundred and ninety-eight.
	63 Vict. No. 17	31 October 1899
An Act to apply out of the Consolidated Revenue Fund the sum of Two Hundred and Fifty Thousand Pounds (Note: £250,000 in 1899 is equivalent to A$45,100,000 in 2022.) to the Service of the Tear ending 30th June, 1900.
	63 Vict. No. 18	16 December 1899
An Act to apply a sum out of the Consolidated Revenue Fund and from Moneys to Credit of the General Loan Fund to the Services of the Year ending the last day of June, One thousand nine, hundred, and to appropriate the Supplies granted in this Session of Parliament.
Constitution Acts Amendment Act 1899	63 Vict. No. 19	16 December 1899 (Note: This act was reserved by the governor for Her Majesty's Pleasure.)
An Act to amend the Constitution Act, 1889, (Note: Constitution Act 1889 (52 Vict. No. 23)) and to amend and consolidate the Acts amending the same.
Electoral Act 1899	63 Vict. No. 20	16 December 1899
An Act to consolidate and amend the Law relating to Parliamentary Elections.
Wines, Beer, and Spirit Sale Amendment Act 1899	63 Vict. No. 21	16 December 1899
An Act to amend the Wines, Beer, and Spirit Sale Act, 1880. (Note: Wines, Beer, and Spirit Sale Act 1880 (44 Vict. No. 9))
	63 Vict. No. 22	16 December 1899
An Act for the Closing of certain Roads and Streets.
Dentists Act Amendment Act 1899	63 Vict. No. 23	16 December 1899
An Act to amend the Dentists Act, 1894. (Note: Dentists Act 1894 (58 Vict. No. 19))
Permanent Reserves Act 1899	63 Vict. No. 24	16 December 1899
An Act to secure the Permanency of certain Reserves.
Agricultural Bank Act Amendment Act 1899	63 Vict. No. 25	16 December 1899
An Act to amend the Agricultural Bank Act, 1894. (Note: Agricultural Bank Act 1894 (58 Vict. No. 21))
Registration of Firms Amendment Act 1899	63 Vict. No. 26	16 December 1899
An Act to amend the Registration of Firms Act, 1897. (Note: Registration of Firms Act 1897 (61 Vict. No. 14))
Subiaco Tramways Act 1899	63 Vict. No. 27	16 December 1899
An Act to confirm a Provisional Order authorising the construction of Tramways in the Municipality of Subiaco.
	Provisional Order.	
	63 Vict. No. 28	16 December 1899
An Act to amend the Fire Brigades Act, 1898. (Note: Fire Brigades Act 1898 (62 Vict. No. 8))
Northam–Goomalling Railway Act 1899	63 Vict. No. 29	16 December 1899
An Act to authorise the Construction of a Railway from Northam to Goomalling.
Menzies–Leonora Railway Act 1899	63 Vict. No. 30	16 December 1899
An Act to authorise the Construction of a Railway from Menzies to Leonora.
Mining on Private Property Act 1898 Amendment Act 1899	63 Vict. No. 31	16 December 1899
An Act to amend the Mining on Private Property Act, 1898. (Note: Mining on Private Property Act 1898 (62 Vict. No. 29))
Totalisator Act Amendment Act 1899	63 Vict. No. 32	16 December 1899
An Act to amend the Act (Note: Totalisator Act 1883 (47 Vict. No. 26)) to legalise the use of the Totalisator under certain circumstances.
Pearl Dealers Licensing Act 1899	63 Vict. No. 33	16 December 1899
An Act for the Licensing of Dealers in Pearls, and for other purposes.
Metropolitan Water Works Act 1899	63 Vict. No. 34	16 December 1899
An Act to amend the Metropolitan Water Works Act, 1896. (Note: Metropolitan Water Works Act 1896 (60 Vict. No. 19))
Sunday Labour in Mines Act 1899	63 Vict. No. 35	16 December 1899
An Act to prevent the unnecessary Employment of Labour in Mines on Sundays.
Pharmacy and Poisons Act Amendment Act 1899	63 Vict. No. 36	16 December 1899
An Act to amend the Pharmacy and Poisons Act, 1894. (Note: Pharmacy and Poisons Act 1894 (58 Vict. No. 35))
	63 Vict. No. 37	16 December 1899
An Act to amend an Act passed in the sixtieth year of Her Majesty, numbered thirty, and intituled "An Act to facilitate the Administration of Justice and the taking of Statutory Declarations." (Note: 60 Vict. No. 30)
Cemeteries Act 1899	63 Vict. No. 38	16 December 1899
An Act for the further Regulation of Cemeteries.
	63 Vict. No. 39	16 December 1899
An Act to confirm certain Expenditure for the year ending 30th June, One thousand eight hundred and ninety-nine.
Bank Holidays Amendment Act 1899	63 Vict. No. 40	16 December 1899
An Act to amend the Bank Holidays Act, 1884. (Note: Bank Holidays Act 1884 (48 Vict. No. 9))
Beer Duty Act Amendment Act 1899	63 Vict. No. 41	16 December 1899
An Act to amend the Beer Duty Act, 1898. (Note: Beer Duty Act 1898 (62 Vict. No. 4))
City of Perth Tramways Amendment Act 1899	63 Vict. No. 42	16 December 1899
An Act to confirm a further Provisional Order to amend or vary a Provisional Order authorising the construction of Tramways in the City of Perth.
	Further Provisional Order.	
Sluicing and Dredging for Gold Act 1899	63 Vict. No. 43	16 December 1899
An Act to encourage the Recovery of Gold by Sluicing, Dredging, and other means.
Loan Act 1899	63 Vict. No. 44	16 December 1899
An Act to authorise the raising of a sum of Six Hundred and Eighty Thousand Pounds (Note: £680,000 in 1899 is equivalent to A$122,600,000 in 2022.) by Loan for the construction of certain Public Works, and other purposes.
Bills of Sale Act 1899	63 Vict. No. 45	16 December 1899
An Act to consolidate and amend the Law relating to Bills of Sale, Liens, and Bailments.
Bank Note Protection Act 1899	63 Vict. No. 46	16 December 1899
An Act to prevent the Defacement of Bank Notes.
Fisheries Act 1899	63 Vict. No. 47	16 December 1899
An Act to amend the Fishery Act, 1889. (Note: Fishery Act 1889 (53 Vict. No. 4))
Mineral Lands Act Amendment Act 1899	63 Vict. No. 48	16 December 1899
An Act to amend the Mineral Lands Act of 1892. (Note: Mineral Lands Act 1892 (55 Vict. No. 3))
Mines Regulation Act Amendment Act 1899	63 Vict. No. 49	16 December 1899
An Act to amend the Mines Regulation Act of 1895, (Note: Mines Regulation Act 1895 (59 Vict. No. 37)) and to make further provision for the Inspection of Mines and Collieries.
Land Act Amendment Act 1899	63 Vict. No. 50	16 December 1899
An Act to amend the Land Act, 1898. (Note: Land Act 1898 (62 Vict. No. 37))
Fremantle Harbour Works Rocky Bay-Rous Head Additional Line of Railway Act 1899	63 Vict. No. 51	16 December 1899
An Act to authorise the Construction of an Additional Line of Railway from Rocky Bay to Rous Head, for the purposes of the Fremantle Harbour Works.
Seats for Shop Assistants Act 1899	63 Vict. No. 52	16 December 1899
An Act to provide for Seats being supplied for the use of Shop Assistants.
Fremantle Water Supply Act 1899	63 Vict. No. 53	16 December 1899
An Act to enable the Director of Public Works to manage and control certain Waterworks within the Municipalities of Fremantle, North Fremantle, and East Fremantle.
Companies Act Amendment Act 1899	63 Vict. No. 54	16 December 1899
An Act to amend an Act passed in the sixty-second year of Her Majesty, and numbered twenty-eight, intituled "An Act to amend the Companies Act, 1893, Amendment Act, 1897." (Note: 62 Vict. No. 28)

=== Private acts ===
Short title, or popular name	Citation	Royal assent
Long title
Cottesloe Lighting and Power (Private) Act 1899	63 Vict. Private Act	16 December 1899
An Act to grant to certain persons powers and provisions for the Manufacture, Distribution, and Supply of Gas and Electricity.
Land Act 1898 Amendment Act (Private) 1899	63 Vict. Private Act	16 December 1899
An Act to amend the Land Act, 1898. (Note: Land Act 1898 (62 Vict. No. 37))
Peppermint Grove, Cottesloe, and Buckland Hill Water Supply (Private) Act 1899	63 Vict. Private Act	16 December 1899
An Act to authorise William Dalgety Moore, or his assigns, to lay down Water Mains and Pipes, and to do all other necessary Acts for the Supply of Water throughout the Roads Board Districts of Peppermint Grove, Cottesloe, and Buckland Hill.

== Sources ==
- "legislation.wa.gov.au".
