= Leioproctus asperifrons =

Scientific classification
- Kingdom: Animalia
- Phylum: Arthropoda
- Clade: Pancrustacea
- Class: Insecta
- Order: Hymenoptera
- Family: Colletidae
- Genus: Leioproctus
- Species: L. asperifrons

Binomial name
- Leioproctus asperifrons Batley, 2025

Species of bee

Leioproctus asperifrons, or Leioproctus (Euryglossidia) asperifrons, is a species of bee in the family Colletidae and subfamily Colletinae. It is endemic to Australia. It was described by entomologist Michael Batley in 2025.

== Etymology ==
The specific epithet asperifrons is an anatomical reference to the roughened central area of the frons.

== Description ==
Female body length is 6 mm. Integumental colouration is mainly black, with metasoma satiny-bronze. The hair is white to golden-brown.

== Distribution and habitat ==
The species occurs in inland southern Western Australia. The type locality is 40 km south of Mernzies in the Goldfields–Esperance region.

== Behaviour ==
The adults are flying mellivores.
