= Electoral results for the Division of Dampier =

Australian division election results

This is a list of electoral results for the Division of Dampier in Australian federal elections from the division's creation in 1913 until its abolition in 1922.

== Members ==
Member	Party	Term
Henry Gregory	Liberal	1913–1917
Henry Gregory	Nationalist	1917–1920
Henry Gregory	Country	1920–1922

== Election results ==
=== Elections in the 1910s ===
==== 1919 ====
1919 Australian federal election: Dampier
Party	Candidate	Votes	%	±%
Nationalist	Henry Gregory	10,440	64.6	−6.8
Labor	Thomas Lowry	5,720	35.4	+6.8
Total formal votes		16,160	97.6	
Informal votes		405	2.4	
Turnout		16,565	55.9	
Nationalist hold		Swing	−6.8	

==== 1917 ====
1917 Australian federal election: Dampier
Party	Candidate	Votes	%	±%
Nationalist	Henry Gregory	15,310	71.4	+17.5
Labor	Michael Costello	6,144	28.6	−17.5
Total formal votes		21,454	95.6	
Informal votes		1,025	4.6	
Turnout		22,479	72.3	
Nationalist hold		Swing	+17.5	

==== 1914 ====
1914 Australian federal election: Dampier
Party	Candidate	Votes	%	±%
Liberal	Henry Gregory	12,817	53.9	+1.3
Labor	Patrick Coffey	10,941	46.1	−1.3
Total formal votes		23,758	95.9	
Informal votes		1,007	4.1	
Turnout		24,765	68.9	
Liberal hold		Swing	+1.3	

==== 1913 ====
1913 Australian federal election: Dampier
Party	Candidate	Votes	%	±%
Liberal	Henry Gregory	12,463	52.6	+2.2
Labor	Hugh Mahon	11,222	47.4	−1.5
Total formal votes		23,685	96.1	
Informal votes		958	3.9	
Turnout		24,643	68.4	
Liberal notional hold		Swing	+1.8	
