= Municipality of Broad Arrow-Paddington =

Former local government area in Western Australia

The Municipality of Broad Arrow-Paddington was a local government area in Western Australia centred on the mining towns of Broad Arrow and Paddington (now Gudarra).

It was established on 23 October 1903 with the amalgamation of the Municipality of Broad Arrow and the Municipality of Paddington, following months of amalgamation discussions between the two councils. The two municipalities had originally been separated by part of the Broad Arrow Road District, but this had been annexed to the Municipality of Broad Arrow on 30 September 1903 in preparation for the merger. The new municipality was based at Broad Arrow; an attempt to have the new council meet for half the year in Paddington was rejected by Broad Arrow councillors during the merger discussions on the basis of the Paddington council's lack of facilities.

The council consisted of a directly-elected mayor and six councillors, representing two three-member wards, one for Broad Arrow and one for Paddington. It first met on 30 October 1903, with the last mayor of Paddington, Mr. McFarlane, becoming the first mayor of the combined municipality after the mayor of Broad Arrow, Mr. Harrop, declined to take on the role and endorsed his colleague.

The council operated recreation grounds at both Broad Arrow and Paddington. The Paddington Mechanics' Institute was vested in the council in 1905, in addition to the Broad Arrow municipal hall it acquired at its inception, and the council undertook additions to the Paddington building later that year. The municipality had neither a water supply nor firefighting appliances in 1910.

It ceased to exist on 12 August 1910, when it was dissolved and merged into the Broad Arrow Road District. The amalgamation was reportedly widely supported locally on the basis of increased efficiencies from uniting into one administration, and the last mayor of Broad Arrow-Paddington, George Hughes, stated that he was "highly pleased" that it had occurred.
