= Callion, Western Australia =

Callion
- Town
- Coordinates: 30.117°S 120.567°E
- Country: Australia
- State: Western Australia
- LGA: Shire of Menzies
- Location: 788 km (490 mi) NE of Perth; 60 km (37 mi) south of Menzies
- Established: 1897

Government
  - State electorate: Kalgoorlie
  - Federal division: O'Connor
- Elevation: 485 m (1,591 ft)
- Postcode: 6436

Callion is an abandoned town in the Goldfields-Esperance region in Western Australia. It is between Coolgardie and Leonora, in the Shire of Menzies.

Gold was discovered here in 1895 and the town was originally known as Speakman's Find after the prospector who made the original discovery. The lease, owned by Speakman, Cooke and Lukin, was 30 acres in size and contained three reefs. The reefs became the Callion Mine, reportedly named after the local Aboriginal word for quartz, although it has been speculated the name was of another prospector. The town was gazetted in 1897.

One of the first mines established in the area was the Lady Kate, which was operating in early 1896. A 20 head battery was erected in the town in 1897 and continued to operate until at least 1902.

Only a cemetery remains of the old townsite, which is now part of Credo Station.
