= North Coolgardie Road District =

Former local government area in Western Australia

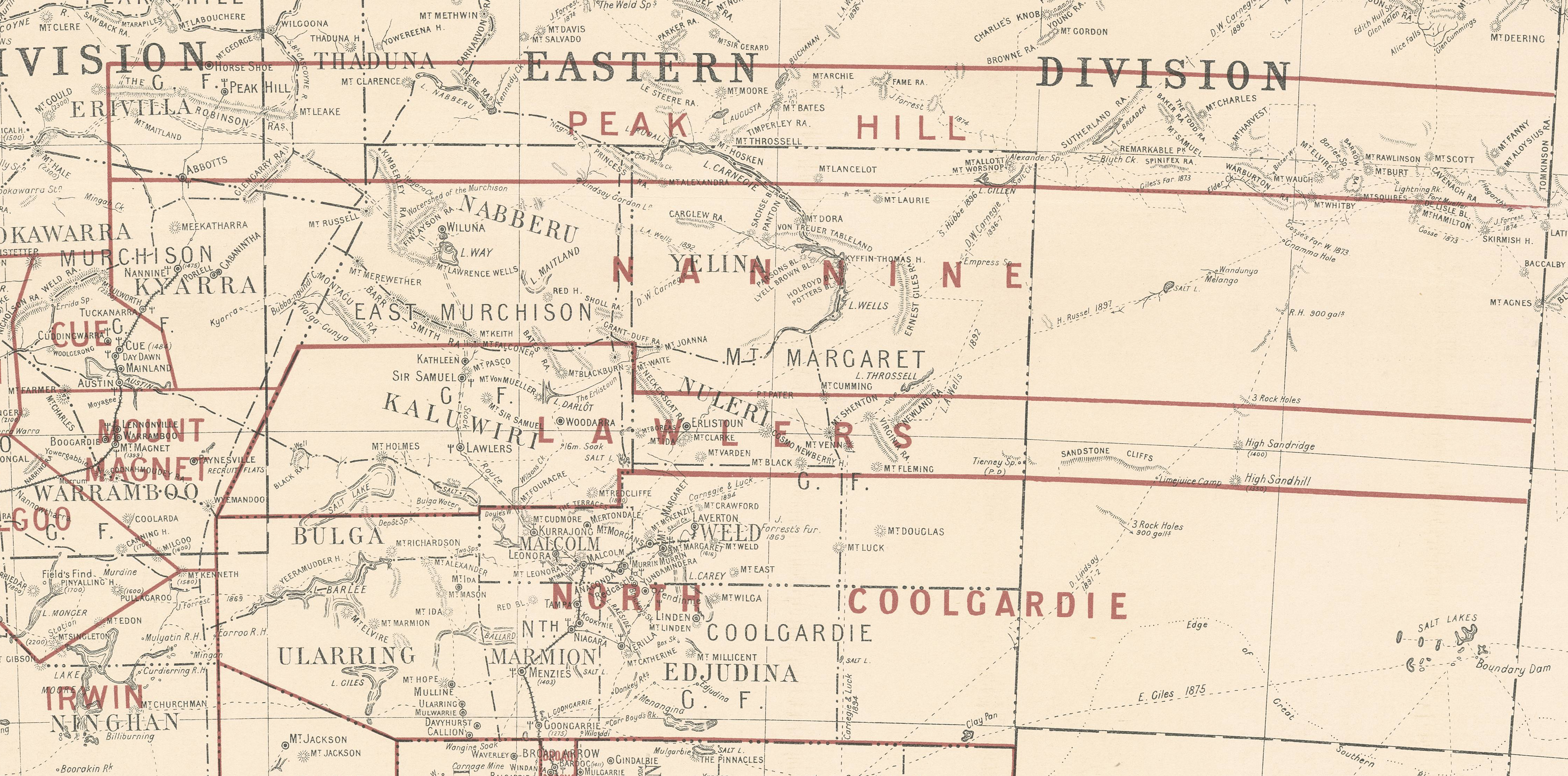
Map of North Coolgardie and adjacent road districts, 1905

The North Coolgardie Road District was an early form of local government area on the Western Australian goldfields. It was based in the town of Menzies, although that township was outside the board's boundaries, having been incorporated as the Municipality of Menzies in 1895.

It was established on 5 August 1898.

The town of Malcolm separated as the Municipality of Malcolm on 26 October 1900. A further section of the district separated on 17 August 1906 to form the Mount Margaret Road Board.

The population of the district increased significantly on 1 March 1912, when it absorbed the Municipality of Menzies and Municipality of Kookynie and re-absorbed the Malcolm municipality. However, the amalgamation was not a success, with the expanded district considered too large to be workable, and only three months later, on 31 May, it was abolished and divided into three new road districts: the Menzies Road District, the Kookynie Road District and the Mount Malcolm Road District.
