= Comet Vale, Western Australia =

Ghost town in Western Australia

Comet Vale Western Australia
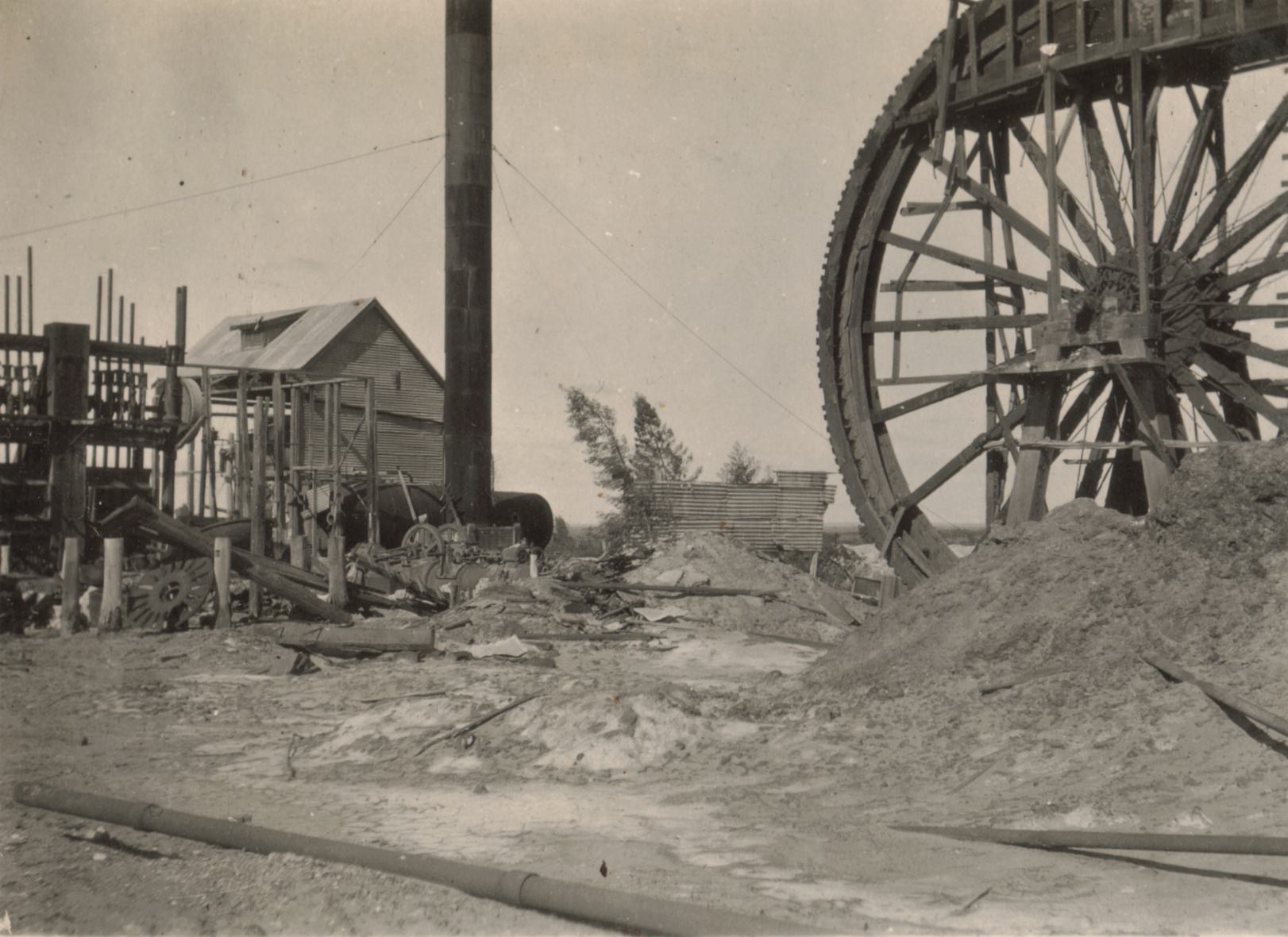
- Old Gladsome Mine, Comet Vale, Western Australia, ca. 1928

- Coordinates: 29.942°S 121.126°E
- Established: 1916
- Postcode(s): 6438
- Elevation: 386 m (1,266 ft)
- Location: 550 km (342 mi) east of Perth; 96 km (60 mi) north of Kalgoorlie
- LGA(s): Shire of Menzies
- State electorate(s): Electoral district of Kalgoorlie
- Federal division(s): O'Connor

Comet Vale is an abandoned town in Western Australia located in the Goldfield region of Western Australia located between Kalgoorlie and Laverton on the Goldfields Highway. It is within the Shire of Menzies.

The town site was named after a comet that could be seen at about the time gold was discovered in the area. By 1895 the town had a population of approximately 500, and by 1897 the townspeople were demanding a post-office. The postmaster general instructed postmasters at Menzies and Googarrie prepare daily mail bags for Comet Vale which were then distributed at one of the stores in town. The Comet Vale Hotel was established some time prior to 1898. The town was gazetted in 1916.

A prospector, Dan Baker is credited with the initial gold discovery. Two mines were in production in 1900 named Lady Margaret and Long tunnel. The Gladsome mine was operating before 1905, and the Moss brothers built a 10-head stamp mill and Coonega at Comet Vale.

Comet Vale was a stop on the Kalgoorlie to Leonora railway line but, while the railway line is still in operation, the town is now longer shown as a stop on contemporary maps.

More mines opened later including Sand Queen and Happy Jack both of which continued to operate after World War I. A police station had been established in the town and was destroyed in 1916. A coach service used to service the town coming from Goongarrie and continuing to the Ularring district.

In 1921 fresh water was found in old shafts not far from town to replace water requirements that had been sent by rail from Kalgoorlie.
