= Goongarrie National Park =

National park in Western Australia

- IUCN category II (national park)
- Location within Western Australia
- Location: Western Australia
- Nearest city: Kalgoorlie
- Coordinates: 30°00′08″S 121°31′51″E
- Area: 603.97 km^{2} (233.19 sq mi)
- Established: 1978
- Governing body: Department of Environment and Conservation
- Website: Official website

Goongarrie National Park is a national park in Western Australia, 592 km (368 mi) east of Perth and about 94 km (58 mi) north of Kalgoorlie.

The park was part of Goongarrie Station that was purchased by the state government in 1995. The area also includes the abandoned townsite of Goongarrie. The name comes from nearby Lake Goongarrie which is Indigenous Australian in origin and of unknown meaning.

Infrastructure in the park was upgraded in 2007 after it received $70,000 in funding from the government.

The park is dominated by arid zone woodlands and is situated along the mulga-eucalypt line. Species of acacia and eucalypt make up the bulk of the vegetation. The southern end of Lake Marmion can be found at the northern end of the park along with many smaller salt lakes and clay pans.

Goongarrie is the transition area between the Coolgardie and Murchison bioregions.

== See also ==
- Protected areas of Western Australia
