= Davyhurst Gold Mine =

Gold mine in Western Australia

Davyhurst
- Location in Western Australia
- Interactive map of Davyhurst
- Location: Menzies, Western Australia, Australia; 30°02′11″S 120°40′14″E
- Products: Gold
- Production: 48,023 troy ounces
- Financial year: 2022–23
- Opened: 2001
- Active: 2001–2008 2017–2018 2021–present
- Company: Ora Banda Mining
- Website: orabandamining.com.au
- Acquired: 2005

The Davyhurst Gold Mine is a gold mine located 53 km south-west of Menzies, near Davyhurst.

The mine was formerly owned by Monarch Gold Mining Company Ltd, and went on care and maintenance shortly before Monarch went into administration in June 2008. The mine resumed operation in early 2021, now owned by Ora Banda Mining, a successor of Monarch Gold.

Historical production for the mine was 230,000 ounces of gold prior to the 1950s, a further 428,000 ounces between 1980 and 2000 and 152,690 ounces in the mining phase between 2000 and 2008.

== History ==
Gold mines in the Kalgoorlie - Leonora region

A first treatment plant at Davyhurst was built by WMC Resources in 1986 and sold on in the following year. After intermittent attempts to mine the area by a number of companies, Cons Gold purchased the mine in 1996, moved the treatment from the Bardoc Gold Mine to Davyhurst, and commenced mining. Cons Gold appointed an administrator in April 1998 and the mine was inherited by N M Rothschild & Sons. Rothschild continued processing until April 1999.

The deposit was purchased in mid-2000 by Croesus Mining NL from Rothschild. Croesus made Davyhurst the first new gold mine to open in Western Australia in the new century.

Within less than a year of acquiring the mine, Croesus moved from exploration to mining and opened Giles open pit operation in May 2001. From 2001 until the mine closed in October 2005, it had produced 387,000 ounces of gold, while historical production for the area since 1897 was 1.15 million ounces.

In November 2005, Croesus sold the mine to the Monarch Gold Mining Company for A$5 million. In June 2006, Croesus Mining went into voluntary administration.

Monarch recommenced mining at Davyhurst in June 2007 and announced its first gold pour in the following August.

The Davyhurst mine was placed in care and maintenance once more on 14 June because of continued underperformance while its second operation, the Mount Ida Gold Mine, remained in production. Michael Kiernan was appointed as managing director of Monarch and resigned as chairman of Territory Resources, the main creditor of Monarch, on 24 June.

Monarch appointed Pitcher Partners as voluntary administrators on 10 July 2008. Two of Monarch's directors, Michael Kiernan and Allan Quadrio, had already taken Croesus, the previous mine owner, into administration two years earlier.

In June 2009, Stirling Resources Limited, under managing director Michael Kiernan, announced to inject funds into Monarch Gold. Stirling announced, it would cover all of Monarch's debt, A$55 million and intended to return both the Mount Ida Gold Mine and Davyhurst into operation, the later within three-month of the take over. Mount Ida is scheduled to produce 48,000 ounces of gold per annum at A$450 an ounce, while Davyhurst would produce 65,000 ounces at A$850. Stirling would rename Monarch to Swan Gold Mining Limited. The proposal was accepted by Monarch's creditors on 1 July 2009.

Stirling experienced considerable delays in their fund raising and had to request for extensions on the deadline for the recapitalisation of Monarch, first to 31 December 2009 and then to 31 January 2010.

If reopened, the mine would be part of Swan's Carnegie Gold Project, alongside the nearby Riverina Gold Project, Mulline Project, Siberia and Lady Ida. The new owners, Swan Gold Mining, announced plans to reopen Davyhurst in May 2010 and Mt Ida in October of the same year.

Swan Gold Mining was renamed to Eastern Goldfields Limited in December 2015 and Ora Banda Mining in June 2019. Eastern Goldfields Limited had to enter voluntary administration in late 2018 after the collapse of a A$75 million recapitalisation plan. A subsequent rescue plan saw the company raise A$22 million in early 2019. It was later reveled that the company was in danger of insolvency as far back as August 2017, when operations at Davyhurst resumed for a brief period.

Ora Banda Mining refurbished the Davyhurst process plant, camp and power station in 2020, which it completed in early 2021. Following completion, surface and underground mining at Davyhurst and processing of ore commenced. Ore at the mine is processed from the local Golden Eagle underground operation as well as the Riverina and Missouri open pits, the former located 45km north of the process plant, the latter located 40km south-east.

== Production ==
Production of the mine:

=== Croesus ===
Annual production of the mine under Croesus:

| Year | Production | Grade | Cost per ounce |
|---|---|---|---|
| 2001 | 61,471 ounces | 2.5 g/t | A$328 |
| 2002 | 91,852 ounces | 2.47 g/t | |
| 2003 | 110,621 ounces | 3.06 g/t | |
| 2004 | 84,570 ounces | 2.58 g/t | |

=== Monarch ===
Quarterly production of the mine under Monarch:

| Quarter | Production | Grade | Cost per ounce |
|---|---|---|---|
| Third Quarter 2007 | 4,085 ounces | 1.19 g/t | |
| Fourth Quarter 2007 | 7,276 ounces | 1.29 g/t | |
| First Quarter 2008 | 7,031 ounces | 1.3 g/t | |
| Second Quarter 2008 | | | |

=== Ora Banda Mining ===
Annual production of the mine under Ora Banda Mining (including under the name of Eastern Goldfields Limited):

| Year | Production | Grade | Cost per ounce |
|---|---|---|---|
| 2008–2017 | in care and maintenance | | |
| 2017–18 | 15,232 ounces | 1.4 g/t | |
| 2018–2021 | in care and maintenance | | |
| 2020–21 | 14,726 ounces | 1.7 g/t | |
| 2021–22 | 61,654 ounces | 2.0 g/t | |
| 2023–23 | 48,023 ounces | 1.5 g/t | |

== See also ==
- List of active gold mines in Western Australia
