= Municipality of Broad Arrow =

The Municipality of Broad Arrow was a local government area in Western Australia centred on the mining town of Broad Arrow.

It was established on 26 February 1897, following local agitation from the Broad Arrow Progress Committee. The first elections were held in April 1897, with the first formal meeting of the council held on 22 April.

The municipality was initially based out of council chambers in the Broad Arrow Stock Exchange, but moved to the Mechanics' Institute building in 1900, subsequently known as the municipal hall. The hall was extended in 1903 to include a new library, reading room, town clerk's office, council chambers and fire station, the additions having been largely funded by the state government.

The municipality annexed an additional area from the Broad Arrow Road District on 30 September 1903, taking in the vacant area of land between its old boundaries and the nearby Municipality of Paddington. It then amalgamated with the Paddington council to form the Municipality of Broad Arrow-Paddington on 23 October 1903. The amalgamation followed months of largely amicable merger negotiations between the two councils, with some delay occurring due to attempts from the Paddington councillors to have some meetings of the merged council held in that town, despite the Paddington council having "neither council chamber, municipal hall, nor offices", a request which was refused by the Broad Arrow council.
