= Linden, Western Australia =

Abandoned town in Western Australia

Linden Western Australia
- Coordinates: 29°18′17″S 122°25′46″E
- Established: 1896
- Postcode(s): 6438
- Elevation: 434 m (1,424 ft)
- Location: 950 km (590 mi) NE of Perth; 75 km (47 mi) south of Laverton
- LGA(s): Shire of Menzies
- State electorate(s): Kalgoorlie
- Federal division(s): O'Connor

Linden is an abandoned town located in the Goldfields-Esperance region in Western Australia. It is found between Kalgoorlie and Laverton near the southern edge of Lake Carey.

In the mid-1890s gold was discovered in the area and in late 1895 four claims were pegged and registered. One claim was by Green, McClellan and the Pyke brothers, another by Linden, Hartigan and Burgess, and the last two by Goodrich, Hayward and Haunort. More claims followed in 1896. Later in 1896 the Mining Warden W. Lambden Owen suggested that a townsite be declared. Owen suggested the name be Griffithston, in honor of the founder, William Griffiths, but the Lands Department instead chose Linden. Despite this only six men were on the field at the time. The town was surveyed and gazetted in 1897. The population had reduced to one by 1906 but the following year increased to 70 and by 1913 another influx occurred. In 1907 a windmill was constructed at the town's only well.

The town is named after Mount Linden which is situated to the south of the town. Linden is thought to be the name of a prospector who worked in the area.
