= Broad Arrow Road District =

Former local government authority in Western Australia

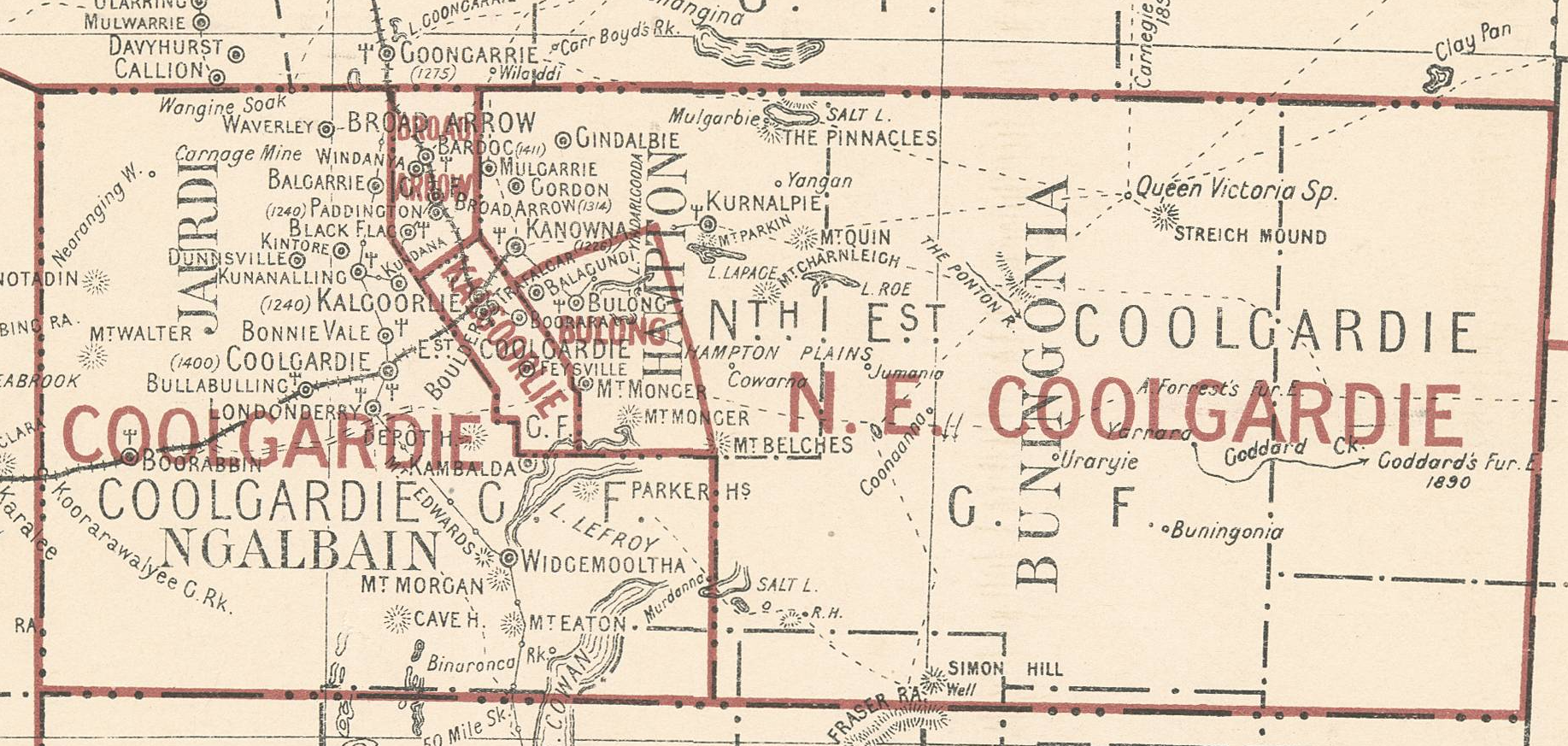
Broad Arrow (top, centre-left) and surrounding road districts, 1905

The Broad Arrow Road District was an early local government area on the Eastern Goldfields of Western Australia.

It was established on 15 December 1899, providing basic local government to the rural areas around the mining town of Broad Arrow, which had already been incorporated as the Municipality of Broad Arrow in 1897. The board's office was located in Broad Arrow township.

The town of Paddington separated as the Municipality of Paddington on 14 June 1901 following agitation from disgruntled residents who felt that they were not receiving their fair proportion of board expenditure.

It absorbed the Broad Arrow township and re-absorbed Paddington on 12 August 1910, when the amalgamated Municipality of Broad Arrow-Paddington merged into the district. It had been proposed at this time to merge the Broad Arrow Road District into the North East Coolgardie Road District based in Kanowna; however, this was abandoned following the amalgamation with the merged municipality.

It absorbed the small towns of Cane Grass, Gimlet, Ora Banda and Waverley from the Coolgardie Road District in late 1911, after complaining that the roads to these towns went through the Broad Arrow board's territory, meaning that they were spending money on these areas and receiving no revenue from it.

It ceased to exist on 7 July 1922, when it merged into the Kalgoorie Road District, becoming the Broad Arrow Ward of that district. It was reported at the time that the Broad Arrow board had been dealing with declining rate revenue and "held out against amalgamation for three years, but eventually had given in".
