= Broad Arrow, Western Australia =

Ghost town in Western Australia

Broad Arrow Western Australia
- Coordinates: 30.4484°S 121.3297°E
- Established: 1896
- Postcode(s): 6431
- Location: 38 km (24 mi) north of Kalgoorlie; 633 km (393 mi) east of Perth; 173 km (107 mi) south of Leonora
- LGA(s): City of Kalgoorlie-Boulder
- State electorate(s): Electoral district of Kalgoorlie
- Federal division(s): O'Connor

Broad Arrow is a ghost town in Western Australia, located 38 km north of Kalgoorlie and 633 km east of Perth. It is on the Kalgoorlie to Leonora Road.

== History ==
Initially called Kurawah, this was where gold was first discovered in 1893, triggering a gold rush in the region north of Kalgoorlie. The Broad Arrow Goldfield was gazetted on 11 November 1896, and in 1897 the municipality of Kurawah was declared.

The town derives its name from the markers, in the shape of a broad arrow, left on the ground by a miner, Reison, who left them to direct his friends who were following him to a gold discovery he had made. His mine was also named Broad Arrow.

Extensions to the Eastern Goldfields Railway, the line from Kalgoorlie to Menzies was begun in August 1897, and reached Broad Arrow on 6 November the same year. The railway station included a 350 ft (110 m) passenger platform.

At its peak the town had 15,000 residents, eight hotels and two breweries as well as a stock exchange. Other facilities included a hospital, three churches, Salvation Army Hall, a chemist, two banks, police station with resident magistrate, a mining registrar, a post office, a cordial factory, six grocery stores and two draperies, and blacksmith and bakers' shops. The town was the administrative centre for smaller settlements in the area including Ora Banda, Smithfield, Black Flat, White Flag and Grant's Patch.

It had its own newspaper, The Broad Arrow Standard, from 1896 to 1899.

A 10,000,000 imp gal (45,000 kl) dam was built for the Public Works Department in Broad Arrow in 1897.

The population of the town was 337 (218 males and 119 females) in 1898.

By the 1920s the gold had run out and the town had been abandoned.

The movie Nickel Queen was filmed here in 1971, using the town's remaining hotel, the Broad Arrow Tavern. The Tavern remains open for travellers today and is noted for having almost every wall covered with handwritten notes from past visitors. In recent years the area has had renewed life with mining companies re-establishing operations, like the Paddington Gold Mine.

== Local authority relative to development of Kalgoorlie ==
The town first gained local government with the Municipality of Broad Arrow in 1897. It amalgamated with the nearby Municipality of Paddington to form the Municipality of Broad Arrow-Paddington in 1903. The merged municipality was then merged into the surrounding Broad Arrow Road District in 1910, which in turn was merged into the Kalgoorlie Road District in 1922.
