= Kookynie, Western Australia =

Kookynie
- Town
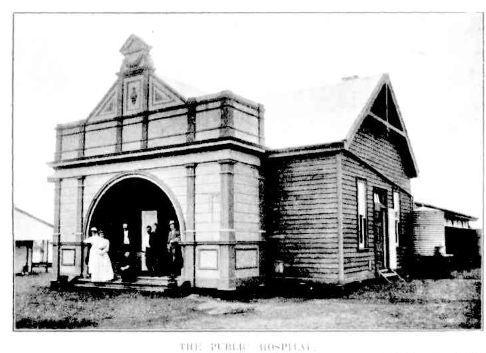
- Kookynie Public Hospital 1905

- Interactive map of Kookynie
- Coordinates: 29°20′13″S 121°29′33″E
- Country: Australia
- State: Western Australia
- LGA: Shire of Menzies
- Location: 796 km (495 mi) ENE of Perth, Western Australia; 70 km (43 mi) NE of Menzies; 52 km (32 mi) SSW of Leonora
- Established: 1900

Government
  - State electorate: Kalgoorlie
  - Federal division: O'Connor

Area
  - Total: 12,576.7 km^{2} (4,855.9 sq mi)
- Elevation: 425 m (1,394 ft)

Population
  - Total: 99 (SAL 2021)
- Postcode: 6431

Kookynie is a town in the Goldfields–Esperance region of Western Australia. The name of the town is believed to be an Aboriginal word that means "waterhole" or "spring". From being a busy town with a population of around 1,500 in 1905, Kookynie has become a ghost town, with around 77 inhabitants in 2006 and 99 in 2021.

== Overview ==
The town originates from when gold was discovered close to the present townsite in 1895 by a group of prospectors including W. A. Miller, who took up the lease of the Englishman mine in the same year. By 1899 the townsite was declared by the government and was gazetted in 1900. The town was named by Mr Beaumont, who managed the Lady Shenton gold mine.

By 1905 the town was lit by electricity and the main employer was the Cosmopolitan Proprietary mine, which employed over 500 men. Other mines included the Britannia and the Cumberland Niagara Champion Proprietary. The town was an important distribution centre for other towns in the area such as Yerilla, Yarri, Yundamindera and Edjudina.

Kookynie grew at an impressive rate on the back of a gold rush and by 1907 the town had a population of over 3,500, a public swimming pool, eleven hotels, a brewery, and received four trains a day from Kalgoorlie.

Today Kookynie has one pub and hotel to serve the tourists. For a Western Australia ghost town (and there are many) it is relatively intact. A walk around the ruins reveals that Kookynie was once a large town.

Located on the road to Kookynie from the Menzies end is Niagara Dam – a concrete gravity dam in an unlikely location. During the usual dry periods the dam level can range from half-full to nothing more than a stagnant puddle of muck. However, for a couple of years after some good cyclone activity in the region the dam is a popular destination for its cool waters.

Kookynie was a stop on the Kalgoorlie to Leonora railway line and is still listed as such on contemporary maps as the Kookynie North ballast siding.
