= Davyhurst, Western Australia =

Davyhurst Western Australia
- Coordinates: 30°03′00″S 120°39′00″E
- Established: 1901
- Postcode(s): 6436
- Elevation: 469 m (1,539 ft)
- LGA(s): Shire of Menzies
- State electorate(s): Kalgoorlie
- Federal division(s): O'Connor

Davyhurst is a Goldfields locality that is situated southwest of Menzies, Western Australia and is approximately 120 kilometres (75 mi) northwest of Kalgoorlie. The proposed townsite was initially declared "Davyston" in 1900. It was also known as Mace's Find and Davyton. Warden Owen of Menzies advised the department the town was better known as "Davyhurst". This was the name used when the town was gazetted in 1901. It is believed to be named after a miner.

Davyhurst is home to the Davyhurst Gold Mine.
