= Yerilla, Western Australia =

Abandoned locality in Western Australia

Yerilla
- Town
- Coordinates: 29°29′02″S 121°49′35″E
- Country: Australia
- State: Western Australia
- LGA: Shire of Menzies
- Location: 830 km (520 mi) ENE of Perth; 105 km (65 mi) ENE of Menzies
- Established: 1896

Government
  - State electorate: Kalgoorlie
  - Federal division: O'Connor
- Elevation: 383 m (1,257 ft)
- Postcode: 6438

Yerilla is an abandoned town located in the Goldfields-Esperance region in Western Australia. It is found between Kalgoorlie and Laverton.

Gold was discovered in the area in January 1895 when the Mount Catherine reef was discovered. The reef is located about 6 kilometres (3.7 mi) south of the town and was particularly rich in alluvial gold. Another outcrop, the Queen of the Earth was discovered by the prospectors MacGregor, McAuliffe and party further from town. This sparked a gold rush to the field and by 1896 the local miners had joined together and formed a progress association and requested that a townsite be declared. The town was gazetted in November 1896.

A police station situated in McKinery Street commenced operations in July 1897 with Constable L. McDonald initially manning the station. A post office and four hotels were open in town in 1898:

- the Commercial Hotel,
- the Smith Hotel (later named the Never Never Hotel),
- the Royal Hotel and
- the Yerilla Hotel.

A coach service from Coolgardie via Menzies and Yerilla to Pennyweight Point operated weekly in 1898. A battery was erected in the area by working leaseholders some time after 1895, but was poorly patronised so by 1900 it was dismantled and taken to Niagara.

The abandoned townsite is situated within the boundaries of Yerilla Station.
