= The Menzies Miner =

Former newspaper in Goldfields of Western Australia

The Menzies Miner was a weekly newspaper based in the mining town of Menzies, Western Australia, which operated from 1895 to 1901.

It was established in December 1895 by future federal Labor government minister Hugh Mahon, who had previously been a newspaper editor at nearby Coolgardie. It was the first newspaper on the North Coolgardie goldfields.

Mahon's editorship was credited with a successful campaign for the establishment of public mining batteries and the exposure of the Perth Ice Company fraud. In 1909, Mahon was alleged to have engaged in newspaper cable piracy during his time at the Miner, a claim that he strongly denied.

Mahon sold the business to the owners of conservative rival Menzies newspaper the North Coolgardie Herald in August 1898, with which Mahon had clashed both personally and ideologically. In 1909, Mahon would claim that the Herald had been "started and carried on with the object of ruining [him]".

The owners of the Herald continued to operate both newspapers from the same office for some years, with the weekly distribution of the Miner in combination with the daily Herald, and distributed it through the North Coolgardie goldfields until local competition emerged in other towns.

It ceased publication in 1901.
