= Yarri, Western Australia =

Abandoned town in Western Australia

Yarri Western Australia
- Coordinates: 29.783°S 122.366°E
- Established: 1903
- Postcode(s): 6431
- Elevation: 417 m (1,368 ft)
- Location: 753 km (468 mi) ENE of Perth; 158 km (98 mi) NE of Kalgoorlie
- LGA(s): Shire of Menzies
- State electorate(s): Kalgoorlie
- Federal division(s): O'Connor

Yarri is an abandoned town located in the Goldfields–Esperance region in Western Australia. It is located between Kalgoorlie and Laverton in the Shire of Menzies.

Gold was discovered in the area in 1902 with the locality being known initially as New Edjudina. The townsite was surveyed following a request from the Mines Department and the surveyor suggested the name of Yarrie. The town was gazetted in 1903, but no lots were sold so it was cancelled in 1904. A new townsite was surveyed and gazetted in 1908.

A state battery existed in the town in 1905 and treated parcels from many of the surrounding mines including Great Banjo, Wallaby Central, Sunday Gift and Holy Moses. The battery was closed in 1931.

The name Yarri or Yarrie is the Aboriginal name of the area but its meaning is not known.
