= Mulline, Western Australia =

Abandoned town in Western Australia

Mulline
- Town
- Coordinates: 29.806°S 120.525°E
- Country: Australia
- State: Western Australia
- LGA: Shire of Menzies
- Location: 768 km (477 mi) ENE of Perth, Western Australia; 40 km (25 mi) west of Menzies
- Established: 1897

Government
  - State electorate: Kalgoorlie
  - Federal division: O'Connor
- Elevation: 454 m (1,490 ft)
- Postcode: 6436

Mulline is an abandoned town located in the Goldfields–Esperance region in Western Australia. It is found between Kalgoorlie and Leonora in the Shire of Menzies.

Gold was discovered in the area in the 1890s and following a gold rush to the area the number of miners in the area resulted in the townsite being gazetted in 1897. The name of town is derived from Mulline Rock, a feature located just outside town. The name of the town was recorded by the surveyor Brazier in 194 and is Aboriginal in origin, although the meaning of it is unknown.

The main mine in the town was the Lady Gladys, which operated between 1896 and 1911. Another mine that was operating in the area around the same time was the Off Chance mine. A state battery was constructed in the area in 1899. Land was set aside for a police station, but never built on. Two hotels existed in the town by 1910.
