= Shire of Menzies =

Coordinates: 29°41′17″S 121°02′13″E

- Local government area
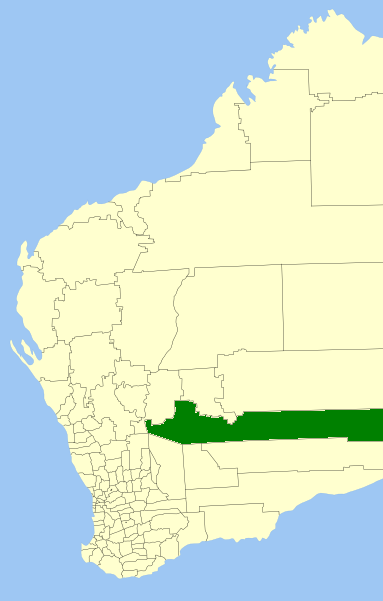
- Location in Western Australia

- Interactive map of Shire of Menzies
- Country: Australia
- State: Western Australia
- Region: Goldfields-Esperance
- Council seat: Menzies

Government
  - Shire President: Paul Warner
  - State electorate: Kalgoorlie
  - Federal division: O'Connor

Area
  - Total: 124,635 km^{2} (48,122 sq mi)

Population
  - Total: 524 (LGA 2021)
- Website: Shire of Menzies
LGAs around Shire of Menzies
Leonora	Laverton	Outback Areas (SA)
Sandstone	Shire of Menzies	Outback Areas (SA)
Coolgardie	Kalgoorlie-Boulder	Outback Areas (SA)

The Shire of Menzies is a local government area in the Goldfields-Esperance region of Western Australia, north of Kalgoorlie. It covers an area of 124,635 square kilometres (48,122 sq mi), and its seat of government is the town of Menzies.

== History ==
The Shire of Menzies originated as the Menzies Road District, which was established on 31 May 1912 after the subdivision of the North Coolgardie Road District into three separate road districts (Menzies, Kookynie and Mt Malcolm). The North Coolgardie Road District had absorbed three municipalities on 1 March 1912, including the Municipality of Menzies covering the Menzies township, but had quickly proven too large and cumbersome to administer and was broken up.

The Kookynie Road District merged into the Menzies Road District in mid-1918.

The Menzies Road District became a shire on 1 July 1961 under the Local Government Act 1960, which reformed all remaining road districts into shires.

== Wards ==
The shire is divided into three wards:

- Menzies Ward (three councillors)
- Kookynie Ward (three councillors)
- Ularring Ward (one councillor)

== Towns and localities ==
The towns and localities of the Shire of Menzies with population and size figures based on the most recent Australian census:

Suburb	Population	Area	Map
Kookynie	99 (SAL 2021)	12,576.7 km^{2} (4,855.9 sq mi)	
Menzies	103 (SAL 2021)	8,194.8 km^{2} (3,164.0 sq mi)	
Plumridge Lakes	273 (SAL 2021)	76,895.4 km^{2} (29,689.5 sq mi)	
Ularring	51 (SAL 2021)	26,597 km^{2} (10,269 sq mi)	

== Abandoned and ghost towns ==
Abandoned and ghost towns in the Shire of Menzies:

- Callion
- Comet Vale
- Davyhurst
- Goongarrie
- Linden
- Mount Ida
- Mulline
- Mulwarrie
- Niagara
- Tampa
- Yarri
- Yerilla
- Yunndaga

== Heritage-listed places ==
As of 2023, 44 places are heritage-listed in the Shire of Menzies, of which 13 are on the State Register of Heritage Places.
