= Leonora railway line =

Railway line in Western Australia

Kalgoorlie to Leonora railway line

Overview
- Locale: Goldfields–Esperance, Western Australia
- Termini: Kalgoorlie; Leonora

History
- Commenced: 1897
- Opened: 12 January 1903

Technical
- Line length: 259 km (161 mi)
- Track gauge: 1,435 mm (4 ft 8 1/2 in)
- Old gauge: 1,067 mm (3 ft 6 in)
- Signalling: Train Order Working
- Highest elevation: 465.7 m (1,528 ft)
- Kalgoorlie to Leonora railway line Main locations

The Kalgoorlie to Leonora railway line or Leonora branch line is a railway line in the Goldfields–Esperance region of Western Australia, connecting Kalgoorlie via Malcolm to Leonora. The line is 259 kilometres (161 mi) long and formerly also had a 103-kilometre (64 mi) branch line from Malcolm to Laverton. At Kalgoorlie, the railway line connects to the Eastern Goldfields Railway, where it also connects to the Esperance branch railway.

== History ==
The consideration of a railway line had the proposed line mentioned as the Mount Leonora line, with even Menzies identified as Mount Menzies.

The Kalgoorlie–Menzies Railway Act 1896, an act by the Parliament of Western Australia granted assent on 27 October 1896, authorised the construction of the railway line from Kalgoorlie to Menzies. The contract for the construction of the first section of the railway, from Kalgoorlie to Menzies, was awarded to Smith & Timms on 20 August 1897 and the railway line was opened on 13 February 1899.

The Menzies–Leonora Railway Act 1899, assented to on 16 December 1899, authorised the construction of the railway line from Menzies to Leonora. The Menzies to Leonora section of the line was awarded to the Western Australian Public Works Department on 25 February 1901 and the line was opened on 12 January 1903.

The Malcolm–Laverton Railway Act 1902, assented to on 20 December 1902, authorised the construction of the branch railway line from Malcolm to Laverton. The branch railway's construction was awarded to J. Timms & Co on 29 June 1903 and the line was opened on 1 February 1905.

In the 1920s, it was proposed to extend the railway line to Wiluna but instead, a line from Meekatharra was built and completed in 1932.

The Railways (Cue–Big Bell and other Railways) Discontinuance Act 1960, assented to on 12 December 1960, authorised the closure of 13 railway lines in Western Australia, among them the branch railway line from Malcolm to Laverton.

Originally constructed as a narrow gauge railway, it was eventually converted to standard gauge. On 13 September 1974, the Kalgoorlie to Leonora railway line was officially opened as a standard gauge railway.

The railway line is now leased to Arc Infrastructure and has been primarily used to transport nickel to the port of Esperance. Due to an oversupply of nickel and a consequent drop in nickel prices, it was announced in July 2024 that BHP would temporarily close all of its Nickel West operations, located north of Leonora, in October 2024 and place them in care and maintenance. Also the railway line's main purpose was for the nickel industry; nickel was not the main product hauled on it but, rather, the products required to refine nickel, specifically sulphur and ammonia.

== Elevation ==
The railway line starts at an elevation of 377.6 metres (1,239 ft) at Kalgoorlie and finishes at Leonora at an elevation of 375.4 metres (1,232 ft). It reaches its lowest point of 338.9 metres (1,112 ft) at the 22.3-kilometre (13.9 mi) mark, south of Broad Arrow, and its highest point of 465.7 metres (1,528 ft) at the 181-kilometre (112 mi) mark, south of Kookynie.

== Legacy ==
The Railway Crane at Laverton is listed on the Shire of Laverton's heritage register.

In the Shire of Menzies, a number of items are on the Western Australian State Register of Heritage Places. The Menzies Railway Station Group includes three residences and the station master's house while, at Goongarrie, three cottages are on the list.
