= Mount Ida, Western Australia =

Abandoned town in Western Australia

Mount Ida Western Australia
- Coordinates: 29.049°S 120.494°E
- Established: 1898
- Postcode(s): 6436
- Location: 832 km (517 mi) ENE of Perth; 100 km (62 mi) ESE of Leonora
- LGA(s): Shire of Menzies
- State electorate(s): Kalgoorlie
- Federal division(s): O'Connor

Mount Ida is an abandoned town located in the Goldfields-Esperance region in Western Australia. It is found between Mount Magnet and Leonora

Named after a geographical feature situated about 21 km south of the town which was named by the explorer John Forrest while on expedition in the area in 1869. It is thought to be named after a lady friend of Forrest. Gold was later discovered in the area in the 1895 resulting in a gold rush and by 1896 the town boasted a population of 200. The area warden lobbied for a town to be declared later the same year and it was eventually gazetted in 1898. The Mount Ida hotel was constructed in 1908. A progress committee to represent the town was formed in 1910.
