= Goongarrie =

Abandoned town in Western Australia

- Town
- Coordinates: 30.043°S 121.161°E
- Country: Australia
- State: Western Australia
- LGA: Shire of Menzies
- Location: 41 km (25 mi) south of Menzies; 84 km (52 mi) north of Kalgoorlie
- Established: 1895

Government
  - State electorate: Electoral district of Kalgoorlie
  - Federal division: O'Connor
- Elevation: 378 m (1,240 ft)
- Postcode: 6438

Goongarrie is an abandoned town in Western Australia, located in the Goldfield region of Western Australia 84 kilometres (52 mi) north of Kalgoorlie.

The town site was originally known as 90 Mile, the distance of the settlement from Coolgardie.

A group of gold miners named Pickersgill, Cahill, Frost and Bennett, discovered gold in the area in 1893, which was the first discovery since gold was struck in Coolgardie. The town was known as 90 Mile and The Roaring Gimlet initially; the latter name comes from the sound the south westerly wind makes as it roars through the gimlet trees. A townsite was proposed in 1894 and gazetted on 17 June 1895.

Goongarrie was a stop on the Kalgoorlie to Leonora railway line and is still listed as such on contemporary maps.

Some of the gold mines that operated in the area were the Phoenix, the Caledonian and Lady Montefiore. The name Goongarrie comes from the nearby Lake Goongarrie, and is an Aboriginal Australian word of unknown meaning. By 1903 the population of the area had dwindled to 66 people. The site of the town later became part of a pastoral station of the same name and is now part of Goongarrie National Park.
