= Niagara, Western Australia =

Abandoned town in Western Australia

Niagara Western Australia
- Coordinates: 29.373361°S 121.439813°E
- Established: 1896
- Postcode(s): 6431
- Location: 788 km (490 mi) ENE of Perth; 153 km (95 mi) north of Kalgoorlie
- LGA(s): Shire of Menzies
- State electorate(s): Kalgoorlie
- Federal division(s): O'Connor

Niagara is an abandoned town located in the Goldfields-Esperance region in Western Australia, between Kalgoorlie and Leonora, 12 kilometres (7.5 mi) southwest of Kookynie.

In January 1895 Charles Northmore and J. Timms were prospecting in the Waterfall or Niagara Falls area. On 4 February they discovered the Port Pirie mine, 3 kilometres (1.9 mi) north of Niagara Falls at what is now named Niagara. Timms died on 14 February, from typhoid.

Following a rapid growth in population the local progress association requested that a townsite be declared early the following year. The Land Department gazetted the townsite later in 1896. On 6 August 1896 the Kalgoorlie-Niagara telegraph line was completed.

Early mines in the area included Challenge, Orion, Emperor, Mikado, Golden Monarch, Lady Betty and Sapphire. Although seven streets in the townsite were gazetted only two, Challenge and Waterfall, were developed. By 1900 over sixty buildings existed within the town and one hundred and fifty stamp head listed on the area. Niagara had a telegraph and post office, mines registrar's office, bank, police station, court house, a number of thriving stores and was unique in Australia in having four hotels, one on each corner, on the crossroads in the centre of the township.

After 1900 Kookynie took over as the district centre and by 1903 Niagara was in decline with a population of 75. By 1905 many of the mud brick buildings were derelict and by 1909 the town was abandoned.
