= Murchison (Western Australia) =

Bioregion in Western Australia

- Region
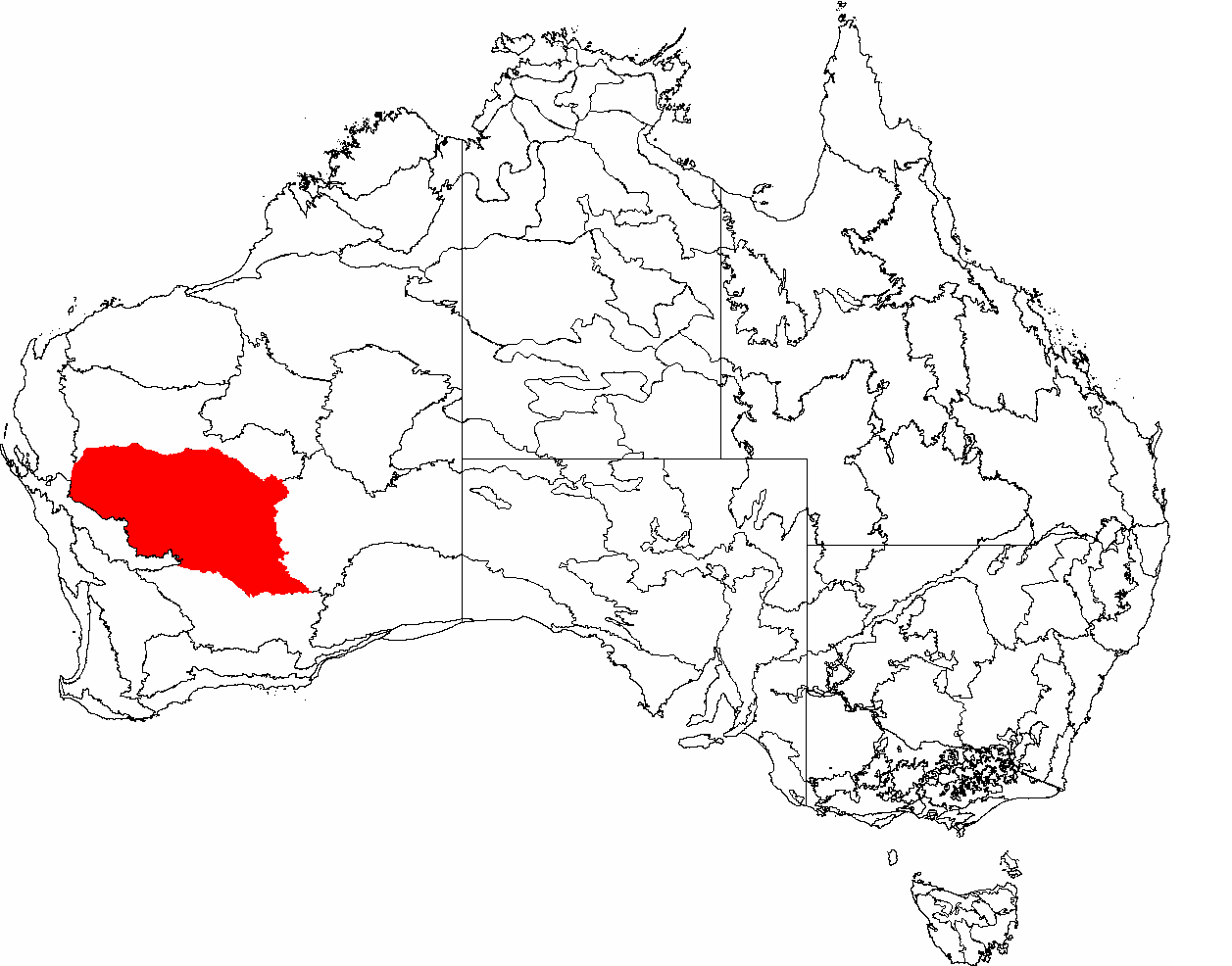
- The interim Australian bioregions, with Murchison in red
- Country: Australia
- State: Western Australia

Area
  - Total: 281,205.54 km^{2} (108,574.07 sq mi)
Regions around Murchison
Carnarvon	Gascoyne	Gascoyne
Yalgoo	Murchison	Great Victoria Desert
Yalgoo	Coolgardie	Coolgardie

The Murchison is a loosely defined area of Western Australia located within the interior of the Mid West region. It was the subject of a major gold rush in the 1890s and remains a significant mining district. The Murchison is also included as an interim Australian bioregion. The bioregion is loosely related to the catchment area of the Murchison River and has an area of 281,205 square kilometres (108,574 sq mi).

== Geography ==
The landscape is characterised by low hills and mesas, separated by colluvium flats and alluvial plains. The western portion of the bioregion is drained by the upper Murchison and Wooramel rivers, which drain westwards towards the coast.

Together with Gascoyne bioregion, it constitutes the Western Australian mulga shrublands ecoregion.

Population is scattered; the largest population centres are Meekatharra, Mount Magnet, and Leonora, with smaller mining and pastoral towns at Yalgoo, Sandstone, Cue, Wiluna, and Leinster.

=== Subregions ===
The Murchison bioregion has two subregions:

- Eastern Murchison (MUR01) – 21,135,040 hectares (52,225,800 acres)
- Western Murchison (MUR02) – 6,985,514 hectares (17,261,580 acres)

=== Political boundaries ===
Local government areas within the bioregion include the Shire of Yalgoo, the Shire of Mount Magnet, the Shire of Murchison, the Shire of Cue, the Shire of Sandstone, the Shire of Meekatharra, the Shire of Wiluna and the Shire of Leonora.

== Climate ==
Murchison has a subtropical desert climate (Köppen: BWh); with very hot summers, mild winters and highly erratic rainfall. The region is very sunny, experiencing 182.8 clear days and only 59.7 cloudy days on average per annum. Extreme temperatures have ranged from 47.6 °C (117.7 °F) on 2 February 2007 to −6.5 °C (20.3 °F) on 1 July 1990. The wettest recorded day was 21 February 2008 with 142.5 mm (5.61 in) of rainfall.

Climate data for Murchison (26.90°S 115.96°E) (287 m (942 ft) AMSL) (1987-2025)
Month	Jan	Feb	Mar	Apr	May	Jun	Jul	Aug	Sep	Oct	Nov	Dec	Year
Record high °C (°F)	47.2 (117.0)	47.6 (117.7)	45.4 (113.7)	41.0 (105.8)	36.8 (98.2)	31.0 (87.8)	30.0 (86.0)	35.5 (95.9)	39.5 (103.1)	43.0 (109.4)	45.5 (113.9)	46.0 (114.8)	47.6 (117.7)
Mean daily maximum °C (°F)	39.5 (103.1)	38.7 (101.7)	35.5 (95.9)	30.8 (87.4)	26.1 (79.0)	21.7 (71.1)	21.2 (70.2)	23.3 (73.9)	26.6 (79.9)	30.7 (87.3)	34.1 (93.4)	37.5 (99.5)	30.5 (86.9)
Mean daily minimum °C (°F)	22.6 (72.7)	23.3 (73.9)	20.6 (69.1)	16.4 (61.5)	11.0 (51.8)	7.6 (45.7)	6.4 (43.5)	7.3 (45.1)	9.8 (49.6)	13.2 (55.8)	16.9 (62.4)	20.4 (68.7)	14.6 (58.3)
Record low °C (°F)	13.0 (55.4)	14.4 (57.9)	8.5 (47.3)	5.5 (41.9)	−0.6 (30.9)	−2.4 (27.7)	−6.5 (20.3)	−1.8 (28.8)	1.1 (34.0)	3.5 (38.3)	6.6 (43.9)	11.5 (52.7)	−6.5 (20.3)
Average precipitation mm (inches)	20.4 (0.80)	30.9 (1.22)	31.5 (1.24)	20.2 (0.80)	16.5 (0.65)	29.2 (1.15)	25.7 (1.01)	19.6 (0.77)	8.0 (0.31)	5.2 (0.20)	7.4 (0.29)	11.8 (0.46)	226.2 (8.91)
Average precipitation days (≥ 0.2 mm)	3.4	4.2	3.8	3.9	3.8	6.9	6.4	5.4	3.0	1.5	2.2	2.7	47.2
Average afternoon relative humidity (%)	21	26	28	34	37	43	44	37	29	24	22	19	30
Average dew point °C (°F)	9.5 (49.1)	12.0 (53.6)	10.8 (51.4)	10.5 (50.9)	8.2 (46.8)	6.6 (43.9)	6.0 (42.8)	4.8 (40.6)	4.2 (39.6)	4.7 (40.5)	5.7 (42.3)	7.0 (44.6)	7.5 (45.5)
Source: Bureau of Meteorology (1987-2025)

== Flora and fauna ==
The predominant plant community is low mulga woodlands and shrublands, characterized by mulga (Acacia aneura), with an understory of herbaceous ephemeral plants and bunchgrasses. Other plant communities include saltbush (Atriplex spp.) shrubland on calcareous soils, low samphire (Tecticornia spp.) shrubland on saline alluvium, and hummock grassland on red sandplains.

== Land use ==
The Murchison is one of the main pastoral areas in Western Australia, dominated by large pastoral leases on Crown land operated as sheep and cattle stations. Mining (gold, iron and nickel) is the major contributor to the region's economy. There are extensive mining areas, with a large number of abandoned historical mining towns and settlements.

The Australian Square Kilometre Array Pathfinder radio telescope is located nearby, and was officially opened in October 2012.

== Protected areas ==
Purchase of pastoral leases by the Western Australian Government increased the area set aside for conservation purposes from about 0.5% of the bioregion in 1998 to 6.7% in 2004. Protected areas include:

- Bullock Holes Timber Reserve
- De La Poer Range Nature Reserve
- Goongarrie National Park
- Matuwa and Kurrara-Kurrara Indigenous Protected Area
- Queen Victoria Spring Nature Reserve
- Toolonga Nature Reserve
- Wanjarri Nature Reserve
