= Menzies, Western Australia =

Menzies
- Town
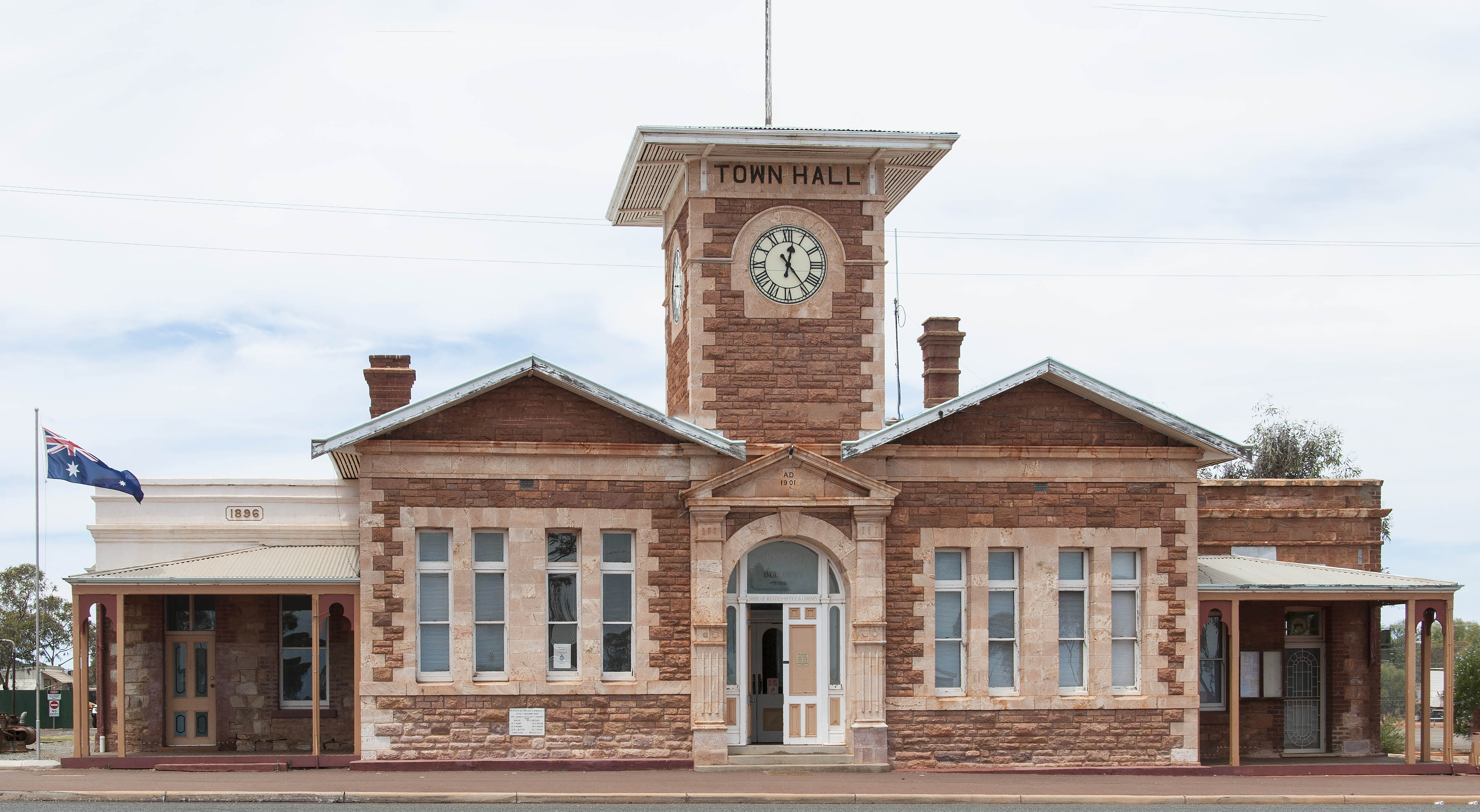
- Town Hall, Menzies

- Interactive map of Menzies
- Coordinates: 29°41′37″S 121°1′44″E
- Country: Australia
- State: Western Australia
- LGA: Shire of Menzies
- Location: 728 km (452 mi) ENE of Perth; 133 km (83 mi) NNW of Kalgoorlie
- Established: 1895

Government
  - State electorate: Kalgoorlie
  - Federal division: O'Connor

Area
  - Total: 8,194.8 km^{2} (3,164.0 sq mi)
- Elevation: 426 m (1,398 ft)

Population
  - Total: 103 (SAL 2021)
- Postcode: 6436
- Mean max temp: 26.3 °C (79.3 °F)
- Mean min temp: 12.6 °C (54.7 °F)
- Annual rainfall: 250.9 mm (9.88 in)

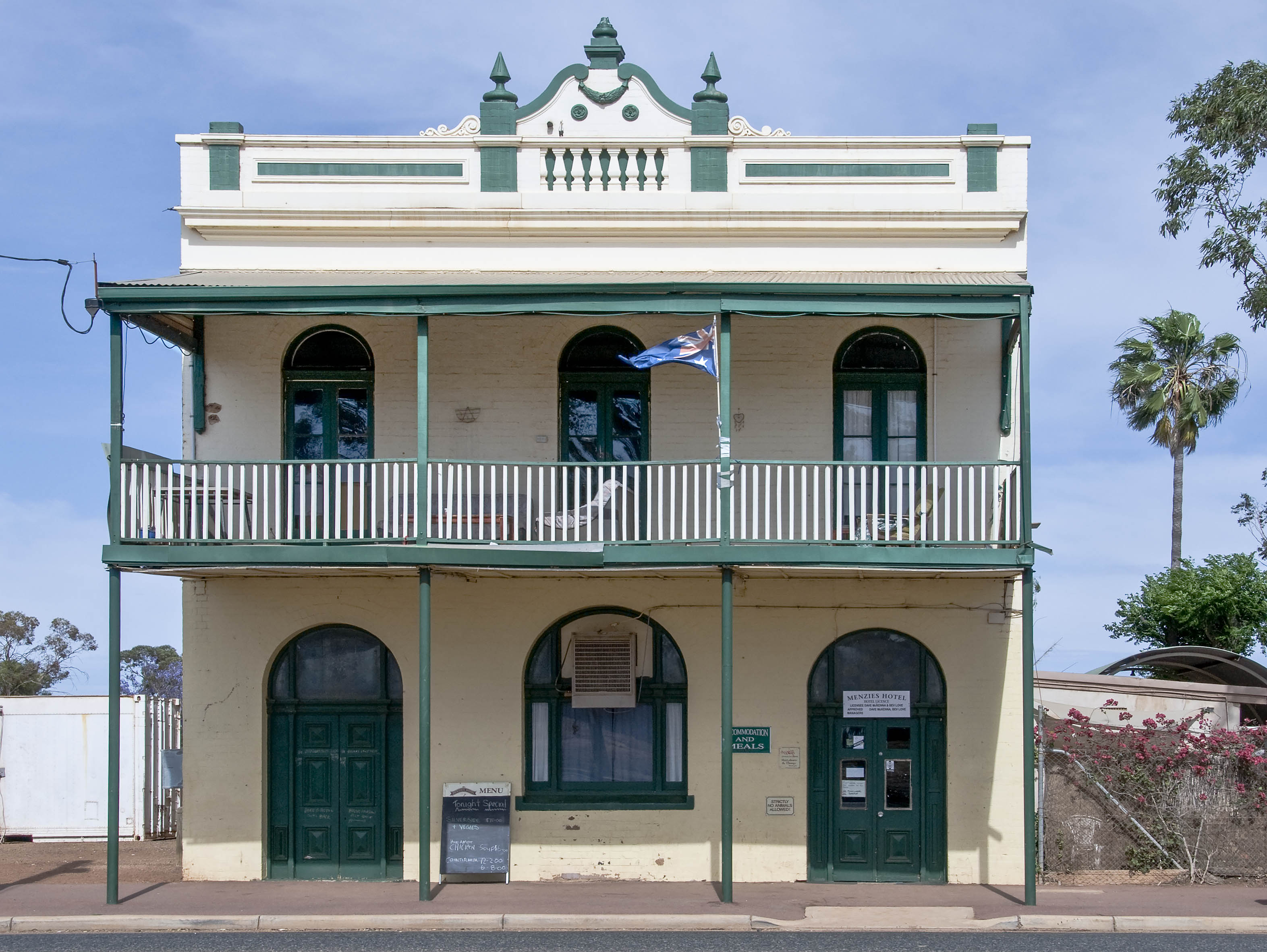
Railway Hotel, Menzies, est. 1902 (now called the Menzies Hotel) and its 117-year-old building still intact and maintained

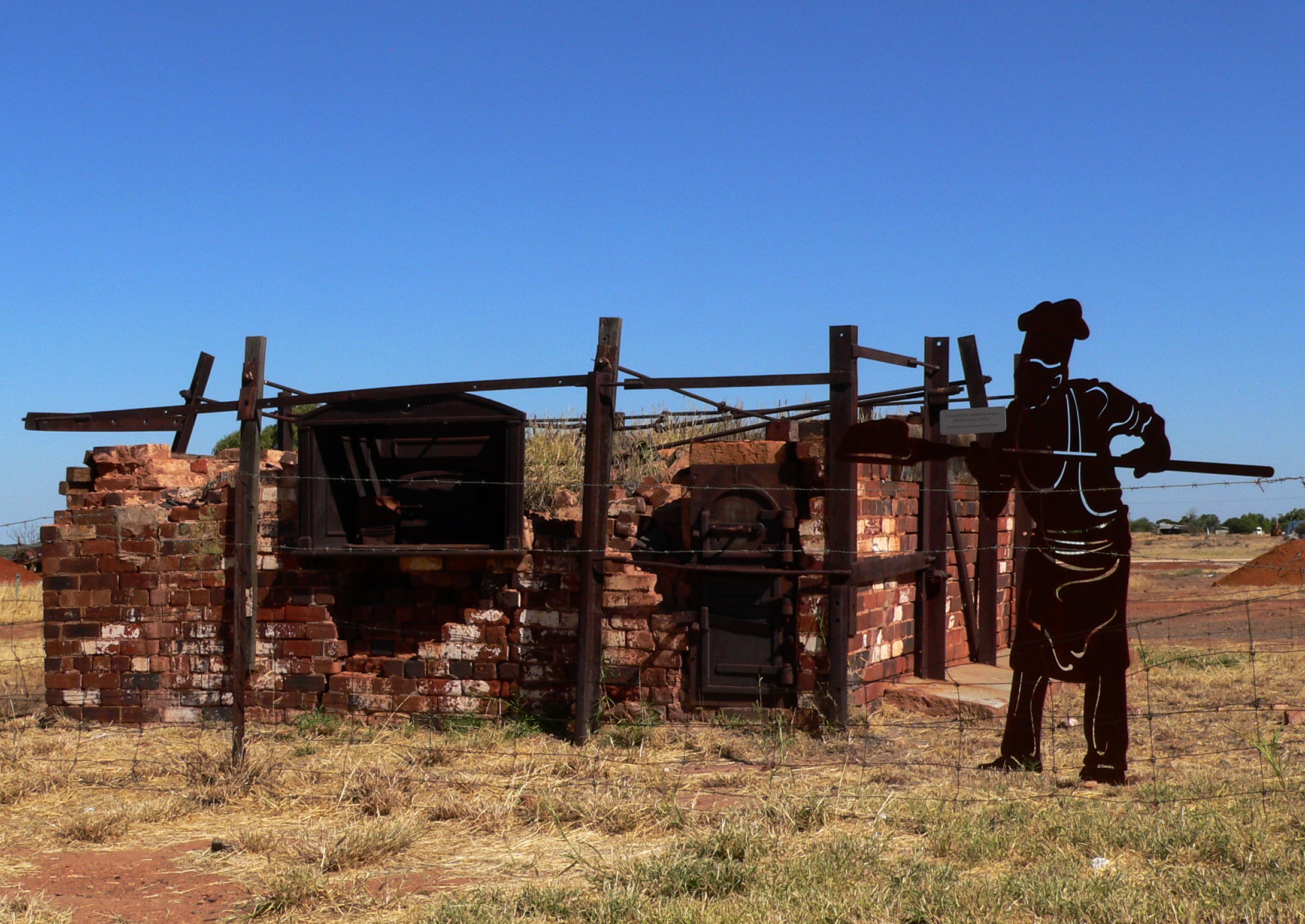
Baker's oven, in the ruins of Wells Bakery

Menzies is a town in the Goldfields-Esperance region of Western Australia, 728 kilometres (452 mi) east-northeast of the state capital, Perth, and 133 kilometres (83 mi) north-northwest of the city of Kalgoorlie. At the 2016 census, Menzies had a population of 108.

== History ==
Gold was discovered in the area in 1894, and Leslie Robert Menzies, a Canadian-born prospector, and John McDonald were the first to take up a lease here in October 1894, naming it the "Lady Shenton". It was a rich gold find, and the Mining Warden for the area recommended a townsite be declared in 1895, named in Menzies' honour. The townsite was gazetted in August 1895.

Land around the town was sold in 1895 and by 1896 it had become a municipality. A railway line was constructed from Kalgoorlie to Menzies and opened on 22 March 1898. By 1900, Menzies had a population of approximately 10,000 with thirteen hotels and two breweries.

There were applications for 320 mining leases, with an average area of 14 acres (5.7 ha), and within a 4 miles (6 km) radius of the post office.

Water had to be carted to the town from underground supplies and from lakes in the surrounding areas. The government started construction of a dam in 1897 that began to supply water to the town by 1901.

The town hall was completed in 1901. The hall tower remained without a clock for over 100 years due to the loss of the original clock in the wreck of the RMS Orizaba off Garden Island in 1905. A clock was finally installed to celebrate the new millennium in 2000.

The prosperity of the town declined shortly after 1901. The gold rush lasted for about 10 years and by 1905 most of the miners had left town to try their luck elsewhere. By 1910 the population of the town had declined to less than 1,000.

Gold mining continues in and around Menzies to the present day.

== Present day ==
Menzies is a place that has seen many changes over the years. The population is generally low (less than 100); however this can change - and has changed rapidly as mines open and close in the local area.

The town includes a hotel, shire office, a nursing post and a moth-balled police station. There had been a roadhouse that provided a post office and general food items but it is now closed. There is currently a small general store which sells a wide variety of foods including baked meals, dairy produce, fruit and vegetables and other small goods.

The police station was closed in 2007 due to budget cuts. The two officers who patrolled over 145,000 square kilometres were transferred, one to Kalgoorlie and the other took an Officer in Charge position at Bencubbin in the Wheatbelt. The Police had built a community relationship with the local town which saw virtually no crime. Community Basketball was a big hit with the children and young adults alike which attributed to the close community ties and work of one of the Senior Constables. The officer and his wife regularly held movie nights at their house for Menzies children who looked forward to Friday nights and a meal. Friendships were formed for the officers which exist to the present day.

== Menzies Cemetery ==
Is located north east of the townsite, One of the largest of the 'goldrush' cemeteries, with many graves of typhoid victims

== Notable people ==
Menzies was the birthplace of:

- Sir Thomas Meagher (1902–1979), surgeon and Lord Mayor of Perth
- Sir Colin Hannah (1914–1978), RAAF officer and Governor of Queensland
- Ted Evans (1939–1981), state Labor MLA

== See also ==
- Carnegie expedition of 1896
- The Menzies Miner
