= List of pastoral leases in Western Australia =

List of agricultural leases in Western Australia

Pastoral leases in Western Australia are increasingly known as "stations", and more particularly as either sheep stations or cattle stations. They are usually found in country that is designated as rangeland. In 2013 there were a total of 527 pastoral leases in Western Australia. All leases were put up for renewal or surrender in 2015.

Stations/pastoral leases are a significant part of Western Australian history. At different stages, inquiries, pleas for extensions of lease times and royal commissions have been made into the industry.

Nearly 90 million hectares or 36% of the area of Western Australia are covered by these stations. Despite the very low population involved in general management of stations, significant numbers of seasonal workers (shearers and others) have moved through the sheep stations to shear for wool. More recently, stations have also been used as holding places of feral goats for export and meat production.

== Administration ==
The current administration of leases is conducted by the appointed Minister for Lands and the Pastoral Lands Board of Western Australia, which succeeded the Pastoral Board after changes to the Land Act 1933 (repealed) and the new Land Administration Act 1997. Further current policies and details of governance are updated within publications and websites administered by the Pastoral Lands Board.

In 2006 the Pastoral Lands Board within the Department of Planning and Infrastructure produced a 24-page pamphlet, which although appearing to be dealing with Outback issues, deals mainly with the process of accessing pastoral leases in Western Australia. The significant distances between stations and points of transport have seen droving or "stock routes" created in the past, such as the Canning Stock Route. Also the rail route to Meekatharra can be seen as a means of reaching into the station country to facilitate stock transport.

== List ==
The list that follows is from various sources – abandoned, amalgamated, relinquished, and historical (no longer current) leases may be in the list.

The list includes the local government, and regional locations – for more specific locating of the stations, the Travellers Atlas of Western Australia map identifies all current pastoral leases.

=== A–C ===
Name of pastoral lease	Region	LGA
Abydos	Pilbara	East Pilbara
Adelong	Goldfields–Esperance	Menzies
Albion Downs	Murchison	Wiluna
Alice Downs	Kimberley	Halls Creek
Andover	Pilbara	Karratha
Anna Plains	Kimberley	Broome
Annean	Murchison	Meekatharra
Arcoona	Goldfields–Esperance	Menzies (former, 1985)
Argyle Downs	Kimberley	Wyndham–East Kimberley
Arizona	Kimberley	Halls Creek
Arrino	Great Southern	Gnowangerup
Arubiddy	Goldfields–Esperance	Dundas
Ashburton Downs	Pilbara	Ashburton
Atley	Murchison	Sandstone
Austin Downs	Murchison	Cue
Avoca Downs	Goldfields–Esperance	Kalgoorlie–Boulder (C)
Badja	Murchison	Yalgoo
Balfour Downs	Pilbara	East Pilbara
Balgair	Goldfields–Esperance	Kalgoorlie–Boulder
Bali	Goldfields–Esperance	Coolgardie
Balla Balla	Pilbara	Ashburton
Balline	Murchison	Northampton
Ballythunna	Murchison	Murchison
Balmoral	Pilbara	Karratha
Bamboo Springs	Pilbara	East Pilbara
Bandya	Goldfields–Esperance	Laverton
Banjawarn	Goldfields–Esperance	Leonora
Barnong	Murchison	Yalgoo
Barrambie	Murchison	Sandstone
Barton Plains	Kimberley	Wyndham–East Kimberley
Barwidgee	Murchison	Wiluna
Bedford Downs	Kimberley	Halls Creek
Beebyn	Murchison	Cue
Belele	Murchison	Meekatharra
Beringarra	Murchison	Murchison
Beyondie	Murchison	Meekatharra
Bidgemia	Gascoyne	Upper Gascoyne
Billabalong	Murchison	Yalgoo
Billiluna	Kimberley	Halls Creek
Billinnooka	Pilbara	East Pilbara
Binthalya	Gascoyne	Carnarvon
Black Flag	Goldfields–Esperance	Kalgoorlie–Boulder (C)
Black Hill	Murchison	Sandstone
Black Range	Murchison	Sandstone
Bohemia Downs	Kimberley	Halls Creek
Bonney Downs	Pilbara	East Pilbara
Booanya	Goldfields–Esperance	Dundas
Boodanoo	Murchison	Mount Magnet
Boodarie	Pilbara	Port Hedland (T)
Boogardie	Murchison	Mount Magnet
Boolaloo	Pilbara	Ashburton
Boolardy	Murchison	Murchison
Boolathana	Gascoyne	Carnarvon
Boonderoo	Goldfields–Esperance	City of Kalgoorlie–Boulder
Booylgoo Spring	Murchison	Sandstone
Bow River	Kimberley	Wyndham–East Kimberley
Bow River	Murchison	Northampton
Braeside	Pilbara	East Pilbara
Brick House	Gascoyne	Carnarvon
Brooking Springs	Kimberley	Derby–West Kimberley
Bryah	Murchison	Meekatharra
Bulga Downs	Murchison	Sandstone
Bullabulling	Goldfields–Esperance	Coolgardie
Bullara	Pilbara	Ashburton
Bullardoo	Murchison	Greater Geraldton
Bulloo Downs	Murchison	Meekatharra
Bundarra	Goldfields–Esperance	Leonora
Bunnawarra	Murchison	Yalgoo
Burkes Park	Kimberley	Halls Creek
Burnabbie	Goldfields–Esperance	Dundas
Burra Rock	Goldfields–Esperance	Coolgardie
Buttah	Murchison	Meekatharra
Byro	Murchison	Murchison
Callagiddy	Gascoyne	Carnarvon
Callawa	Pilbara	East Pilbara
Callytharra Springs	Gascoyne	Carnarvon
Calooli	Goldfields–Esperance	Coolgardie
Cane River	Pilbara	Ashburton
Carbla	Gascoyne	Shark Bay
Carbine	Goldfields–Esperance	Coolgardie
Cardabia	Gascoyne	Carnarvon
Carey Downs	Gascoyne	Upper Gascoyne
Carlaminda	Murchison	Yalgoo
Carlindi	Pilbara	East Pilbara
Carlton Hill	Kimberley	Wyndham–East Kimberley
Carnegie	Goldfields–Esperance	Wiluna
Carnot	Kimberley	Broome
Carranya	Kimberley	Halls Creek
Carrarang	Gascoyne	Shark Bay
Carson River	Kimberley	Wyndham–East Kimberley
Cashmere Downs	Murchison	Sandstone
Challa	Midwest	Mount Magnet
Charnley River	Kimberley	Wyndham–East Kimberley
Cherrabun	Kimberley	Derby–West Kimberley
Cherratta	Pilbara	Karratha
Chilimony	Murchison	Northampton
Chirritta	Pilbara	Karratha
Christmas Creek	Kimberley	Halls Creek
Clifton Downs	Gascoyne	Upper Gascoyne
Clover Downs	Goldfields–Esperance	Leonora
Cobra	Gascoyne	Upper Gascoyne
Coburn	Gascoyne	Shark Bay
Cogla Downs	Murchison	Sandstone
Cooalya	Gascoyne	Carnarvon
Coodardy	Murchison	Cue
Coolawanyah	Pilbara	Ashburton
Coolcalalaya	Murchison	Northampton
Cooloomia	Gascoyne	Shark Bay
Coonana	Goldfields–Esperance	Kalgoorlie–Boulder (C)
Coongan	Pilbara	East Pilbara
Cooralya	Gascoyne	Carnarvon
Coordewandy	Gascoyne	Upper Gascoyne
Cooya Pooya	Pilbara	Karratha
Corunna Downs	Pilbara	East Pilbara
Country Downs	Kimberley	Broome
Cowarna Downs	Goldfields–Esperance	Kalgoorlie–Boulder (C)
Credo	Goldfields–Esperance	Coolgardie
Croydon	Pilbara	Karratha
Culculli	Murchison	Cue
Cunyu	Murchison	Wiluna
Curbur	Murchison	Murchison

=== D–J ===
Name of pastoral lease	Region	LGA
Dairy Creek	Gascoyne	Upper Gascoyne
Dalgaranga	Murchison	Yalgoo
Dalgety Downs	Gascoyne	Upper Gascoyne
Dampier Downs	Kimberley	Broome
Dandaraga	Murchison	Sandstone
Daniels Well	Pilbara	Ashburton
Davyhurst	Goldfields–Esperance	Menzies (former, 1985)
De Grey	Pilbara	Port Hedland (T)
Deepdale	Pilbara	Ashburton
Denham	Kimberley	Wyndham–East Kimberley
Depot Springs	Murchison	Sandstone
Desdemona	Goldfields–Esperance	Leonora
Diamond Well	Murchison	Meekatharra
Dirk Hartog	Gascoyne	Shark Bay
Dooley Downs	Gascoyne	Upper Gascoyne
Doolgunna	Murchison	Meekatharra
Doon Doon	Kimberley	Wyndham–East Kimberley
Doongan	Kimberley	Halls Creek
Doorawarrah	Gascoyne	Carnarvon
Drysdale River	Kimberley	Wyndham–East Kimberley
Duck Creek	Pilbara	Ashburton
Durack River	Kimberley	Wyndham–East Kimberley
Earaheedy	Murchison	Wiluna
Edaggee	Gascoyne	Carnarvon
Edah	Murchison	Yalgoo
Edjudina	Goldfields–Esperance	Menzies
Edmund	Gascoyne	Upper Gascoyne
Eel Creek	Pilbara	East Pilbara
Eginbah	Pilbara	East Pilbara
El Questro	Kimberley	Wyndham–East Kimberley
Elgee Cliffs	Kimberley	Halls Creek
Ellavalla	Gascoyne	Carnarvon
Ellenbrae	Kimberley	Wyndham–East Kimberley
Elliott Creek	Gascoyne	Upper Gascoyne
Elvire	Kimberley	Halls Creek
Emu Creek	Pilbara	Exmouth
Erlistoun	Goldfields–Esperance	Laverton
Erong Springs	Gascoyne	Upper Gascoyne
Errabiddy	Gascoyne	Upper Gascoyne
Ethel Creek	Pilbara	East Pilbara
Ettrick	Pilbara	East Pilbara
Eudamullah	Gascoyne	Upper Gascoyne
Eurardy	Murchison	Northampton
Exmouth Gulf	Pilbara	Exmouth
Faure	Gascoyne	Shark Bay
First King	Goldfields–Esperance	Dundas
Flora Valley	Kimberley	Halls Creek
Fossil Downs	Kimberley	Derby–West Kimberley
Fox River	Kimberley	Halls Creek
Fraser Range	Goldfields–Esperance	Dundas
Frazier Downs	Kimberley	Broome
Frog Hollow	Kimberley	Wyndham–East Kimberley
Gabyon	Murchison	Yalgoo
Gibb River	Kimberley	Wyndham–East Kimberley
Gidgee	Murchison	Wiluna
Gifford Creek	Gascoyne	Upper Gascoyne
Gilroyd	Gascoyne	Shark Bay
Gindalbie	Goldfields–Esperance	Kalgoorlie–Boulder (C)
Ginrock	Goldfields–Esperance	Menzies
Giralia	Gascoyne	Shire of Exmouth
Glen	Murchison	Cue
Glenflorrie	Pilbara	Ashburton
Glen Hill	Kimberley	Wyndham–East Kimberley
Glenayle	Murchison	Wiluna
Glenburgh	Gascoyne	Upper Gascoyne
Glenorn	Goldfields–Esperance	Leonora
Glenroy	Pilbara	Ashburton
Glenroy	Kimberley	Derby–West Kimberley
Globe Hill	Pilbara	Ashburton
Gnaraloo	Gascoyne	Carnarvon
Gogo	Kimberley	Halls Creek
Goodingnow	Murchison	Yalgoo
Goongarrie	Goldfields–Esperance	Menzies
Goose Hill	Kimberley	Wyndham–East Kimberley
Gordon Downs	Kimberley	Halls Creek
Granite Peak	Murchison	Wiluna
Greenvale	Kimberley	Wyndham–East Kimberley
Hamelin	Gascoyne	Shark Bay
Hamersley	Pilbara	Ashburton
Harding River	Pilbara	Ashburton
Hill	Kimberley	Broome
Hill Springs	Gascoyne	Carnarvon
Hill View	Murchison	Meekatharra
Hillside	Pilbara	East Pilbara
Home Valley	Kimberley	Wyndham–East Kimberley
Hooley	Pilbara	Ashburton
How Mah	Kimberley	Broome
Hy Brazil	Murchison	Mount Magnet
Ida Valley	Goldfields–Esperance	Menzies
Ilgarari	Murchison	Meekatharra
Illawarra	Goldfields–Esperance	Menzies
Indee	Pilbara	Port Hedland (T)
Inglewood	Murchison	Sandstone
Innouendy	Murchison	Murchison
Iona	Murchison	Mount Magnet
Ivanhoe	Kimberley	Wyndham–East Kimberley
Jaurdi	Goldfields–Esperance	Coolgardie
Jimba Jimba	Gascoyne	Upper Gascoyne
Jimberlana	Goldfields–Esperance	Dundas
Jimblebar	Murchison	Meekatharra
Jingemarra	Murchison	Yalgoo
Juna Downs	Pilbara	Ashburton
Jundee	Murchison	Wiluna

=== K ===
Name of pastoral lease	Region	LGA
Kadji Kadji	Murchison	Morawa
Kalli	Murchison	Murchison
Kalumburu	Kimberley	Wyndham–East Kimberley
Kanandah	Goldfields–Esperance	City of Kalgoorlie–Boulder
Kangan	Pilbara	East Pilbara
Kangiangi	Pilbara	Ashburton
Karara	Murchison	Perenjori
Karbar	Murchison	Cue
Karunjie	Kimberley	Wyndham–East Kimberley
Kathleen Valley	Goldfields–Esperance	Leonora
Kennedy Range	Gascoyne	Carnarvon
Killara	Murchison	Meekatharra
Kilto	Kimberley	Broome
Kimberley Downs	Kimberley	Derby–West Kimberley
Kinclaven	Goldfields–Esperance	City of Kalgoorlie–Boulder
Kirkalocka	Murchison	Mount Magnet
Kookynie	Goldfields–Esperance	Menzies
Kooline	Pilbara	Ashburton
Koongie Park	Kimberley	Halls Creek
Koonmarra	Murchison	Meekatharra
Koordarrie	Pilbara	Ashburton
Korong	Goldfields–Esperance	Laverton
Kumarina	Murchison	Meekatharra
Kurrajong	Goldfields–Esperance	Leonora
Kyarra	Murchison	Cue
Kybo	Goldfields–Esperance	City of Kalgoorlie–Boulder

=== L ===
Name of pastoral lease	Region	LGA
Lake Barlee	Murchison	Sandstone
Lake Mason	Murchison	Sandstone
Lake Nerramyne	Murchison	Greater Geraldton
Lake Violet	Murchison	Wiluna
Lake Way	Murchison	Wiluna
Lake Wells	Goldfields–Esperance	Laverton
Lakeside	Murchison	Cue
Lalla Rookh	Pilbara	East Pilbara
Lamboo	Kimberley	Hals Creek
Landor	Gascoyne	Upper Gascoyne
Lansdowne	Kimberley	Halls Creek
Larranganni	Kimberley	Halls Creek
Laverton Downs	Goldfields–Esperance	Laverton
Leinster Downs	Goldfields–Esperance	Leonora
Leopold Downs	Kimberley	Halls Creek
Lewis Creek	Kimberley	Halls Creek
Limestone	Pilbara	East Pilbara
Lissadell	Kimberley	Wyndham–East Kimberley
Liveringa	Kimberley	Derby–West Kimberley
Lochada	Murchison	Perenjori
Lorna Glen	Murchison	Wiluna
Louisa Downs	Kimberley	Halls Creek
Lyndon	Gascoyne	Carnarvon
Lynton	Murchison	Northampton
Lyons River	Gascoyne	Upper Gascoyne

=== M ===
Name of pastoral lease	Region	LGA
Mabel Downs	Kimberley	Halls Creek
Madoonga	Murchison	Cue
Madoonia Downs	Goldfields–Esperance	Coolgardie
Madura	Goldfields–Esperance	Dundas
Mallina	Pilbara	Karratha
Manberry	Gascoyne	Carnarvon
Mandora	Kimberley	Broome
Manfred	Murchison	Murchison
Mangaroon	Gascoyne	Upper Gascoyne
Maranalgo	Murchison	Yalgoo
Mardathuna	Gascoyne	Carnarvon
Mardie	Pilbara	Karratha
Margaret River	Kimberley	Halls Creek
Marillana	Pilbara	East Pilbara
Marion Downs	Kimberley	Wyndham–East Kimberley
Maroonah	Pilbara	Ashburton
Marrilla	Gascoyne	Carnarvon
Marron	Gascoyne	Carnarvon
Mary Springs	Murchison	Northampton
Marymia	Murchison	Meekatharra
Meadow	Gascoyne	Shark Bay
Meda	Kimberley	Derby–West Kimberley
Meeberrie	Murchison	Murchison
Meedo	Gascoyne	Carnarvon
Meeline	Murchison	Mount Magnet
Meeragoolia	Gascoyne	Carnarvon
Meka	Murchison	Yalgoo
Melangata	Murchison	Yalgoo
Melita	Goldfields–Esperance	Leonora
Mellenbye	Murchison	Yalgoo
Melrose	Goldfields–Esperance	Leonora
Menangina	Goldfields–Esperance	Menzies
Menangina South	Goldfields–Esperance	Menzies
Merlinleigh	Gascoyne	Upper Gascoyne
Merolia	Goldfields–Esperance	Laverton
Mertondale	Goldfields–Esperance	Leonora
Mia Mia	Gascoyne	Carnarvon
Middalya	Gascoyne	Carnarvon
Mileura	Murchison	Murchison
Milgun	Murchison	Meekatharra
Millbillillee	Murchison	Wiluna
Millijidee	Kimberley	Derby–West Kimberley
Millrose	Murchison	Wiluna
Millstream	Pilbara	Ashburton
Milly Milly	Murchison	Murchison
Minara	Goldfields–Esperance	Leonora
Minderoo	Pilbara	Ashburton
Mingah Springs	Murchison	Meekatharra
Minilya	Gascoyne	Carnarvon
Minnie Creek	Gascoyne	Upper Gascoyne
Mitchell River	Kimberley	Wyndham–East Kimberley
Moogooree	Gascoyne	Carnarvon
Mooka	Gascoyne	Carnarvon
Moola Bulla	Kimberley	Halls Creek
Mooloo Downs	Gascoyne	Upper Gascoyne
Mooloogool	Murchison	Meekatharra
Moonera	Goldfields–Esperance	Dundas
Moopina	Goldfields–Esperance	Dundas
Moorarie	Murchison	Meekatharra
Mornington	Kimberley	Derby–West Kimberley
Mount Amherst	Kimberley	Halls Creek
Mount Anderson	Kimberley	Derby–West Kimberley
Mount Augustus	Gascoyne	Upper Gascoyne
Mount Barnett	Kimberley	Shire of Derby–West Kimberley
Mount Brockman	Pilbara	Ashburton
Mount Burges	Goldfields–Esperance	Coolgardie
Mount Carnage	Goldfields–Esperance	Kalgoorlie–Boulder
Mount Celia	Goldfields–Esperance	Menzies
Mount Clere	Gascoyne	Upper Gascoyne
Mount Divide	Pilbara	East Pilbara
Mount Edgar	Pilbara	East Pilbara
Mount Elizabeth	Kimberley	Wyndham–East Kimberley
Mount Elvire	Goldfields–Esperance	Shire of Menzies
Mount Farmer	Murchison	Mount Magnet
Mount Florence	Pilbara	Ashburton
Mount Gibson	Murchison	Yalgoo
Mount Gould	Murchison	Meekatharra
Mount Hale	Murchison	Meekatharra
Mount Hardman	Kimberley	Derby–West Kimberley
Mount Hart	Kimberley	Derby–West Kimberley
Mount House	Kimberley	Derby–West Kimberley
Mount Jackson	Goldfields–Esperance	Yilgarn
Mount James	Gascoyne	Upper Gascoyne
Mount Jowlaenga	Kimberley	Broome
Mount Keith	Murchison	Wiluna
Mount Minnie	Pilbara	Ashburton
Mount Monger	Goldfields–Esperance	Kalgoorlie–Boulder
Mount Narryer	Murchison	Murchison
Mount Newman	Pilbara	East Pilbara
Mount Padbury	Murchison	Meekatharra
Mount Phillips	Gascoyne	Upper Gascoyne
Mount Pierre	Kimberley	Derby–West Kimberley
Mount Remarkable	Goldfields–Esperance	Menzies
Mount Sandiman	Gascoyne	Upper Gascoyne
Mount Satirist	Pilbara	Port Hedland
Mount Seabrook	Murchison	Meekatharra
Mount Stuart	Pilbara	Ashburton
Mount Vernon	Murchison	Meekatharra
Mount Vetters	Goldfields–Esperance	Kalgoorlie–Boulder
Mount View	Murchison	Northampton
Mount Welcome	Pilbara	Karratha
Mount Weld	Goldfields–Esperance	Laverton
Mount Windarra	Goldfields–Esperance	Laverton
Mount Wittenoom	Murchison	Murchison
Muccan	Pilbara	East Pilbara
Muggon	Murchison	Murchison
Mulga Downs	Pilbara	Ashburton
Mulgul	Murchison	Meekatharra
Mulyie	Pilbara	East Pilbara
Mumbinia	Murchison	Mount Magnet
Mundabullangana	Pilbara	Port Hedland
Mundrabilla	Goldfields–Esperance	Dundas
Mungari	Goldfields–Esperance	Coolgardie
Munglinup	Goldfields–Esperance	Ravensthorpe
Muralgarra	Murchison	Yalgoo
Murchison Downs	Murchison	Meekatharra
Murchison House	Murchison	Northampton
Murgoo	Murchison	Murchison
Murrum	Murchison	Mount Magnet
Myroodah	Kimberley	Derby–West Kimberley

=== N–P ===
Name of pastoral lease	Region	LGA
Nalbarra	Murchison	Mount Magnet
Nallan	Murchison	Cue
Nambi	Goldfields–Esperance	Leonora
Nanambinia	Goldfields–Esperance	Dundas
Nanga	Gascoyne	Shark Bay
Nangetty	Murchison	Mingenew
Nanutarra	Pilbara	Ashburton
Napier Downs	Kimberley	Derby–West Kimberley
Narloo	Murchison	Yalgoo
Narndee	Murchison	Mount Magnet
Narracoota	Murchison	Meekatharra
Neds Creek	Murchison	Meekatharra
Nerren Nerren	Gascoyne	Shark Bay
New Forest	Murchison	Murchison
New Springs	Murchison	Meekatharra
Nicholson	Kimberley	Halls Creek
Nimingarra	Pilbara	East Pilbara
Ningaloo	Gascoyne	Exmouth
Ningbing	Kimberley	Wyndham–East Kimberley
Ninghan	Murchison	Yalgoo
Nita Downs	Kimberley	Broome
Nookawarra	Murchison	Murchison
Noondie	Murchison	Murchison
Noongal	Murchison	Yalgoo
Noondoonia	Goldfields–Esperance	Dundas
Noonkanbah	Kimberley	Derby–West Kimberley
Noreena Downs	Pilbara	East Pilbara
Norie	Murchison	Meekatharra
Nyang	Pilbara	Ashburton
Ord River	Kimberley	Halls Creek
Osmond Valley	Kimberley	Halls Creek
Oudabunna	Murchison	Yalgoo
Pantijan	Kimberley	Wyndham–East Kimberley
Pardoo	Pilbara	East Pilbara
Paroo	Murchison	Meekatharra
Peedamulla	Pilbara	Ashburton
Pentecost Downs	Kimberley	Wyndham–East Kimberley
Perkolilli	Goldfields–Esperance	Kalgoorlie–Boulder
Peron	Gascoyne	Shark Bay
Perrinvale	Goldfields–Esperance	Menzies
Phillips Range	Kimberley	Halls Creek
Piarri	Kimberley	Wyndham–East Kimberley
Pilga	Pilbara	East Pilbara
Pimbee	Gascoyne	Carnarvon
Pindabunna	Murchison	Yalgoo
Pindathuna	Murchison	Yalgoo
Pinegrove	Murchison	Greater Geraldton
Pingandy	Gascoyne	Upper Gascoyne
Pinnacles	Goldfields–Esperance	Leonora
Pippingarra	Pilbara	Port Hedland
Prairie Downs	Murchison	Meekatharra
Premier Downs	Goldfields–Esperance	Kalgoorlie–Boulder
Prenti Downs	Murchison	Wiluna
Pullagaroo	Murchison	Yalgoo
Pyramid	Pilbara	Karratha

=== Q–T ===
Name of pastoral lease	Region	LGA
Quanbun	Kimberley	Shire of Derby–West Kimberley
Quobba	Gascoyne	Carnarvon
Quondong Downs	Kimberley	Broome
Rawlinna	Goldfields–Esperance	Kalgoorlie–Boulder
Red Hill	Pilbara	Ashburton
Riverdale	Pilbara	Port Hedland
Riverina	Goldfields–Esperance	Menzies
Robertson Range	Pilbara	East Pilbara
Rockhole	Kimberley	Halls Creek
Rocklea	Pilbara	Ashburton
Roebuck Plains	Kimberley	Broome
Rosewood	Kimberley	Wyndham–East Kimberley
Roy Hill	Pilbara	East Pilbara
Ruby Plains	Kimberley	Halls Creek
Saunders Creek	Kimberley	Halls Creek
Seemore Downs	Goldfields–Esperance	Kalgoorlie–Boulder
Shaw River	Pilbara	Port Hedland
Sherlock	Pilbara	Karratha
Sophie Downs	Kimberley	Halls Creek
Southern Hills	Goldfields–Esperance	Dundas
Speewah	Kimberley	Wyndham–East Kimberley
Spring Creek	Kimberley	Wyndham–East Kimberley
Springvale	Kimberley	Halls Creek
Strelley	Pilbara	Port Hedland
Sturt Creek	Kimberley	Halls Creek
Sturt Meadows	Goldfields–Esperance	Leonora
Sylvania	Murchison	Meekatharra
Tabba Tabba	Pilbara	East Pilbara
Tableland	Kimberley	Halls Creek
Taincrow	Murchison	Cue
Talga Talga	Pilbara	East Pilbara
Talisker	Gascoyne	Shark Bay
Tallering	Murchison	Murchison
Tamala	Gascoyne	Shark Bay
Tambrey	Pilbara	Ashburton
Tangadee	Murchison	Meekatharra
Tardie	Murchison	Yalgoo
Tarmoola	Goldfields–Esperance	Leonora
Texas Downs	Kimberley	Halls Creek
Thangoo	Kimberley	Broome
Theda	Kimberley	Wyndham–East Kimberley
Three Rivers	Murchison	Meekatharra
Thundelarra	Murchison	Yalgoo
Tibradden	Murchison	Greenough
Tickalara	Kimberley	Halls Creek
Towera	Pilbara	Ashburton
Towrana	Gascoyne	Upper Gascoyne
Turee Creek	Pilbara	Meekatharra
Turner	Kimberley	Halls Creek
Twin Peaks	Murchison	Murchison

=== U–Z ===
Name of pastoral lease	Region	LGA
Uaroo	Pilbara	Ashburton
Ullawarra	Pilbara	Ashburton
Urala	Pilbara	Ashburton
Urawa	Murchison	Greater Geraldton
Wagga Wagga	Murchison	Yalgoo
Wahroonga	Gascoyne	Carnarvon
Waldburg	Gascoyne	Upper Gascoyne
Walgun	Pilbara	East Pilbara
Wallal Downs	Kimberley	Broome
Wallareenya	Pilbara	Port Hedland (T)
Walling Rock	Goldfields–Esperance	Menzies
Wandagee	Gascoyne	Carnarvon
Wandarrie	Murchison	Mount Magnet
Wandina	Murchison	Mullewa
Wanna	Gascoyne	Upper Gascoyne
Wanteen	Goldfields–Esperance	Dundas
Warambie	Pilbara	Karratha
Warralong	Pilbara	East Pilbara
Warrawagine	Pilbara	East Pilbara
Warriedar	Murchison	Yalgoo
Warroora	Gascoyne	Carnarvon
Waterbank	Kimberley	Broome
Weebo	Goldfields–Esperance	Leonora
Weedarra	Gascoyne	Upper Gascoyne
Weelarrana	Murchison	Meekatharra
Weld Range	Murchison	Cue
White Cliffs	Goldfields–Esperance	Laverton
White Springs	Pilbara	East Pilbara
Williambury	Gascoyne	Carnarvon
Winderie	Gascoyne	Upper Gascoyne
Windidda	Murchison	Wiluna
Windimurra	Murchison	Sandstone
Windsor	Murchison	Mount Magnet
Winning	Gascoyne	Carnarvon
Wogarno	Murchison	Mount Magnet
Wondinong	Murchison	Mount Magnet
Wonganoo	Murchison	Wiluna
Wongawol	Murchison	Wiluna
Woodlands	Murchison	Meekatharra
Woodleigh	Gascoyne	Shark Bay
Woodstock	Pilbara	East Pilbara
Wooleen	Murchison	Murchison
Woolgorong	Murchison	Mullewa
Woolibar	Goldfields–Esperance	Coolgardie
Woolyeenyer	Goldfields–Esperance	Dundas
Wooramel	Gascoyne	Carnarvon
Woorlba	Goldfields–Esperance	Dundas
Woyyo	Gascoyne	Carnarvon
Wydgee	Murchison	Yalgoo
Wyloo	Pilbara	Ashburton
Wynyangoo	Murchison	Mount Magnet
Yakabindie	Goldfields–Esperance	Leonora
Yalardy	Gascoyne	Shark Bay
Yalbalgo	Gascoyne	Carnarvon
Yalbra	Gascoyne	Upper Gascoyne
Yallalong	Murchison	Murchison
Yalleen	Pilbara	Ashburton
Yalobia	Gascoyne	Carnarvon
Yaloginda	Murchison	Meekatharra
Yamarna	Goldfields–Esperance	Laverton
Yandal	Goldfields–Esperance	Leonora
Yandeyarra	Pilbara	Port Hedland (T)
Yandi	Murchison	Northampton
Yanrey	Pilbara	Ashburton
Yaramin	Kimberley	Halls Creek
Yardie Creek	Gascoyne	Exmouth
Yaringa	Gascoyne	Carnarvon
Yarlarweelor	Murchison	Meekatharra
Yarrabubba	Murchison	Meekatharra
Yarragadee	Murchison	Mingenew
Yarraloola	Pilbara	Ashburton
Yarraquin	Murchison	Cue
Yarrie	Pilbara	East Pilbara
Yeeda	Kimberley	Derby–West Kimberley
Yeelirrie	Murchison	Wiluna
Yelma	Murchison	Wiluna
Yerilla	Goldfields–Esperance	Menzies
Yinnetharra	Gascoyne	Upper Gascoyne
Yoothapina	Murchison	Meekatharra
Youangarra	Murchison	Sandstone
Youanmi Downs	Murchison	Sandstone
Yougga Walla	Kimberley	Halls Creek
Young River	Goldfields–Esperance	Dundas
Youno Downs	Murchison	Wiluna
Yoweragabbie	Murchison	Mount Magnet
Yuin	Murchison	Murchison
Yuinmery	Murchison	Sandstone
Yundamindera	Goldfields–Esperance	Leonora

== See also ==
- List of homesteads in Western Australia
- List of the largest stations in Australia

== Atlas/map references ==
- Travellers atlas (1978–present)
- Western Australia. Department of Lands and Surveys (1978), Travellers atlas of Western Australia, Govt. Printer
- Streetsmart Travellers Atlas of Western Australia (2006) Department of Land Information and West Australian Newspapers,10th ed. ISBN 1-921048-13-1
  - In the state Maps (Road Maps of Western Australia Maps 1–154) 'Pastoral Lease Stations' are identified with their names and boundaries.
- Quality Publishing Australia.(2007) Roads & tracks Western Australia : campsites directory, roads and tracks, all in one Jolimont, W.A., Quality Publishing Australia, 5th ed ISBN 1-876723-35-1
  - Identifies homesteads but not specific pastoral leases.
- UBD Western Australia country road atlas (2005) Macquarie Park, N.S.W.UBD, a division of Universal Publishers, 11th ed ISBN 0-7319-1587-9
  - Identifies only selected pastoral leases in the first 20 general maps of the volume.
