= Ettrick Station =

Pastoral lease in Pilbara region of Western Australia

Coordinates: 20.526°S 119.67°E

Location in Western Australia

Ettrick Station is a pastoral lease that was once a sheep station but now operates as a cattle station in Western Australia.

The station was established prior to 1872 when the townsite of Condon was surveyed as a port to service the growing number of pastoral stations developed along the De Grey River, including Ettrick, Warrawagine, Warralong, Congan, Muccan, Yarrie, and Mulyie Stations.

In 1923 the property was sold twice in a week. The first sale was from G. L. Hardie, Stewart and Company to Corbett and Holthouse of Muccan Station, and Frank Young, of Adelaide. The price was approximately £28,000. Shortly afterwards it was sold to the De Grey Pastoral Company Ltd., at an increased figure.

== See also ==
- List of ranches and stations
- List of pastoral leases in Western Australia
