= Warroora =

Pastoral lease in Western Australia

Coordinates: 23.48279°S 113.79272°E

Location in Western Australia

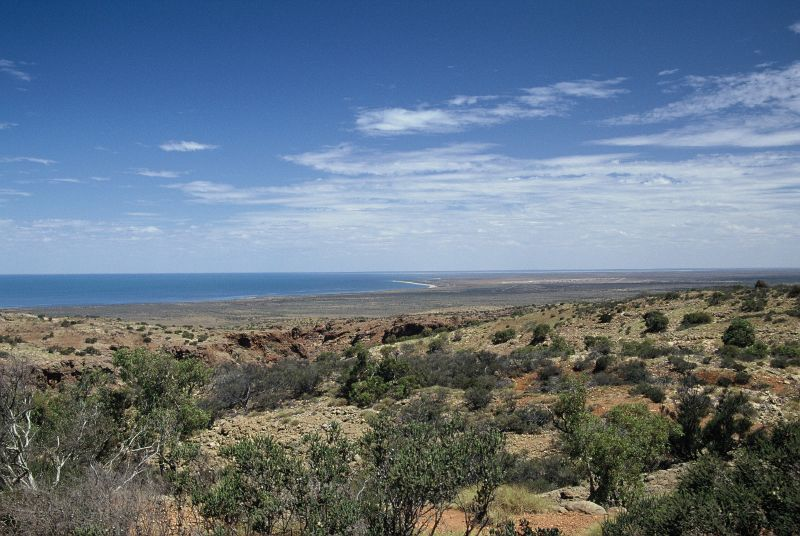
Ningaloo coastline

Warroora, or Warroora Station, is a pastoral lease that once operated as a sheep station and is now operating as a cattle station in the Gascoyne region of Western Australia. The property offers eco friendly accommodation to tourists with visitors able to stay in the old homestead, shearers' quarters or camping near the beach.

== Location ==
Situated on part of the Minilya-Exmouth Road, Warroora Station is located 18 kilometres (11 mi) south east of Coral Bay and 177 kilometres (110 mi) north of Carnarvon in the Gascoyne region. The Ningaloo Coast is adjacent to the property, which has approximately 50 kilometres (31 mi) of ocean frontage. Ningaloo Station is situated to the north of Warroora, Minilya Station is found to the south east and Gnaraloo to the south.

== History ==
Warroora was a part of Minilya Station during the time George Julius Brockman owned the property. The lands of Warroora saved Brockman's flocks on occasions when he shifted them to this coastal country. Brockman regarded the country highly as it was rich in milkbush that could support sheep in the driest season and required little water.

The property was purchased by Mr. H. G. Lefroy, who had recently sold Binthalya Station, from Donald N. McLeod in 1906, when it occupied an area of 280,000 acres (113,312 ha) of virgin country. The schooner Rescue was scheduled to deliver fencing materials to the site early the next year. Lefroy bought 2,000 ewes from Brick House Station in 1907 to stock up Warroora, and by 1908, 84 bales of wool were produced.

The property was sold by Lefroy in 1922 to Percy St. Barbe Ayliffe and H. R. Read. The property occupied an area of 271,000 acres (109,670 ha) and was running a flock of 13,000 sheep. By 1925 the property had been divided into 11 paddocks and one bore had been sunk that was producing 1,000,000 imperial gallons (4,546,090 L) of water per day from a depth of 1,780 feet (543 m), providing a water supply to seven of the paddocks.

By 1933 the property was carrying a flock of 23,000 sheep, including 5,000 lambs, and produced a total of 518 bales of wool.

The Horak family acquired Warroora in 1994 and have been living at and managing the property in a sustainable manner since that time.

A couple from Canberra drowned while holidaying at Warroora in 2013; the woman's body washed up shortly afterwards and the man's body washed up at Elle's beach a week later.

In 2015 the station owners had to renegotiate the lease agreement with the state government, including having the government excise sections of pastoral land along the world-heritage listed Ningaloo Coast from the property, for conservation and tourism ventures.

== See also ==
- List of pastoral leases in Western Australia
