= Barrambie Station =

Pastoral lease in Western Australia

Coordinates: 27°31.349′S 119°10.611′E

Location in Western Australia

Barrambie Station is a pastoral lease that has previously operated as a sheep station but now is a cattle station in Western Australia.

It is located approximately 120 kilometres (75 mi) south east of Meekatharra and 140 km (87 mi) north east of Mount Magnet in the Mid West region of Western Australia.

The 100,564 ha (248,500 acres) property has a five bedroom homestead and can carry 450 head of cattle and was listed for sale in 2018 for A$680,000. It had been very lightly stocked to virtually destocked from about 2004 to 2019 and the range report gives the property a potential carrying capacity of up to 680 cattle. In 2019 it was carrying 60 droughtmaster cattle. It was originally set up as a sheep station.

== See also ==
- List of ranches and stations
- List of pastoral leases in Western Australia
