= Cardabia =

Pastoral lease in Western Australia

Coordinates: 23.104°S 113.804°E

Location in Western Australia

Cardabia Station, commonly referred to as Carbabia, is a pastoral lease that operates as a cattle station in the Gascoyne region of Western Australia.

It is situated about 6 kilometres (4 mi) north east of Coral Bay and 133 kilometres (83 mi) south of Exmouth. Warroora Station is on Carbadia's southern boundary.

Cardabia is currently owned by the Indigenous Land Corporation, who acquired the 2,000-square-kilometre (772 sq mi) property in 1997. The Indigenous Land Corporation divested to the Baiyangu Aboriginal Corporation in 1998; the latter operate the property, including providing training opportunities to the traditional owners of the area.

The earliest recorded lease in the area was for 20,000 acres (8,094 ha), taken up by the Quailborough Squatting Company on New Year's Day in 1880.

The Cardabia and Lyndon runs, with a total area of 428,000 acres (173,205 ha), were put up for sale in 1884; both were unstocked at the time.

By 1913 approximately 16,000 sheep were shorn, producing 330 bales of wool.

The area was struck by drought, with only 2 inches (51 mm) of rain falling through a 13-month period from mid-1918 to late 1919.

In 2015 the station owners had to renegotiate the lease agreement with the state government, including having the government excise sections of pastoral land along the world-heritage listed Ningaloo Coast from the property, for conservation and tourism ventures.

== See also ==
- List of pastoral leases in Western Australia
