= Warrawagine =

Pastoral lease in Western Australia

Coordinates: 20°51′02″S 120°41′44″E

Location in Western Australia

Warrawagine or Warrawagine Station is a pastoral lease and cattle station located between Marble Bar and Broome in the Pilbara region of Western Australia.

== Description ==
The property is 1,000,000 acres (4,047 km^{2}) in size and is approximately 140 kilometres (87 mi) north east of Marble Bar bordering the Great Sandy Desert. The Oakover River borders the property, and the Carawine Gorge lies within the property boundary.

== Current ownership and management ==
As at 2026, Warrawagine Cattle Co owns both Warrawagine and Wallal Downs Stations, with the company being the private asset of Rob Jowett. The company operates the two properties jointly, with their Droughtmaster breeder programme being based at Warrawagine Station, and Wallal Downs acting as a finishing and sale depot. Both breeder and finishing operations are supplemented by the production of rhodes grass hay and silage on Wallal Downs centre pivot irrigation sites, Homestead and Cooragoora pivots.

Lux and Belinda Lethbridge have managed Warrawagine and Wallal Downs stations on behalf of Warrawagine Cattle Co since 2016, with Wallal Downs having been overseen under the Lethbridge's, by Ken and Megan Tarlinton since 2022.

The Warrawagine Cattle Co Droughtmaster herd is recognised for their fertility and consistent quality in both domestic and international markets, as highlighted by 'Droughtmaster Australia'.

== History ==
Warrawagine was established in 1896 and was initially managed by Frank Thompson and his wife Ceclia. The homestead was built in 1901 along with the store, workshop shed and blacksmith shop.

In 1916 the property was acquired by the Rubin family and contributed to the wool production for uniforms in both world wars.

The property was acquired by Mills in 1992 and was stocked with 460 cattle at the time. Wallal Downs was acquired in 2013 when the property market for cattle stations was at its lowest point.

In 2015 the property was owned by Robin Mills and Rob Jowett and run along with Wallal Station; Warragine is stocked with approximately 23,000 head of droughtmaster cattle. The pair have diversified and planted 37 hectares (91 acres) of sorghum, which is being grown using a centre-pivot irrigation system.

The 2015 season was dry with the station also being hit hard by bushfires. The station also commenced earthworks to hold annual rainwater runoff for longer to help rehydrate the rangelands in the De Grey River catchment area. Surrounding properties including Limestone, De Grey and Yarrie Stations are also involved in the project.

As of 2017 Rob Jowett became the sole owner of Warrawagine and Wallal Downs stations under Warrawagine Cattle Co, with the dissolving of the partnership with Robin Mills.

== See also ==
- List of ranches and stations
