= List of homesteads in Western Australia: 0–9 =

This list includes all homesteads in Western Australia with a gazetted name. It is complete with respect to the 1996 Gazetteer of Australia. Dubious names have been checked against the online 2004 data, and in all cases confirmed correct. However, if any homesteads have been gazetted or deleted since 1996, this list does not reflect these changes. Strictly speaking, Australian place names are gazetted in capital letters only; the names in this list have been converted to mixed case in accordance with normal capitalisation conventions.

Name	Location	Remarks
10 Mile Outcamp	28°24′S 121°14′E	
17 Mile Outcamp	24°6′S 116°0′E	
45 Mile Outcamp	29°21′S 120°31′E	

== See also ==
- List of pastoral leases in Western Australia
