= Atley Station =

Pastoral lease in Western Australia

Coordinates: 28.6407°S 118.7373°E

Location in Western Australia

Atley Station is a pastoral lease that operates as a sheep and goat station in Western Australia. The property is historically significant for its long association with the pastoral industry in the Sandstone district.

It is located along the Paynes Find-Sandstone road approximately 110 kilometres (68 mi) east of Mount Magnet and 150 kilometres (93 mi) west of Leinster in the Mid-West region of Western Australia.

The station had been established sometime prior to 1915. The lessee in 1915 was W.N. Cock, who was running sheep on the property at the time. By 1921 Wirth and Williams held the lease to the property, followed by Cumberland and Black in 1924, with Cumberland leaving the partnership leaving R.S. Black & Son as the leaseholders in 1927. Black also later acquired Roy Hill station at some time prior to 1934. Robert Silvers Black died in 1934 after a brief illness leaving his son Robin to take control of Atley.

The Black family remained at the property until 1939 when it was placed on the market. At this time Atley occupied an area of 261,882 acres (105,980 ha) with most of the area fenced into 20 sheep-proof paddocks and 11 holding paddocks. It was stocked with 2,500 sheep, 10 horses and 15 cattle. Buildings included the nine room homestead, shearing shed and assorted outbuildings with 16 fully equipped wells or bores. The typical flora found at Atley included mulga, kurara, saltbush, bluebush and other seasonal herbage.

In 2004 the lease was held by T.J. Hodshon.

== See also ==
- List of ranches and stations
- List of pastoral leases in Western Australia
