= Abydos Station =

Pastoral lease in Western Australia

Coordinates: 21°24′39″S 118°55′44″E

Location in Western Australia

Abydos Station is a pastoral lease and cattle station located between Tom Price and Marble Bar and approximately 126 km south of Port Hedland in the Pilbara region of Western Australia.

The station occupies an area of 248,800 acres (100,686 ha), and in 1946 had 192 miles (309 km) of fencing and the property was divided into 18 paddocks. The property also had 28 wells equipped with mills and a homestead and shearing shed. The Turner River flows through a portion of Abydos, and one of the neighbouring properties is Redcliffs Station.

The traditional owners of the area are the Kariyarra peoples, who maintain a strong connection with country at Abydos and the nearby Yandeyarra Community.

In 1912 the station was owned by Hall and Hester and was shipping bullocks out of Roebourne.

The rationing officer at the station in 1930 was Frank Leeds; the station was in debt to the tune of 13,000 pounds at the time.

The station is home to a rock formation known as the London Wall or China Wall, which is about 100 feet (30 m) wide and 200 yards (183 m) long; the feature looks as though it is man-made but is a natural formation of granite tors that has been uplifted. The formation was first reported in 1938.

The state government purchased Abydos and Woodstock stations in 1946. Both were set up to operate as research stations under the management of the CSIRO, Department of Agriculture and Institute of Agriculture of the University of Western Australia.

The station suffered some damage in 1947 when a cyclone passed through the area. The shearing shed and the cook's quarters were blown over, and an estimated 10 inches (254 mm) of rain fell.

== See also ==
- List of ranches and stations
- List of pastoral leases in Western Australia
