= Quanbun =

Pastoral lease in Western Australia

Coordinates: 18°23′10″S 125°13′34″E

Location in Western Australia

Quanbun Station, also known as Quanbum and Quanbun Downs, is a pastoral lease and cattle station located about 40 kilometres (25 mi) southwest of Fitzroy Crossing in the Kimberley region of Western Australia.

== History ==
The station was established at some point prior to 1887. In 1887, Edwin Rose and his brother became managers and part-owners of Quanbun. In 1888 the property occupied an area of 50,000 acres (20,234 ha). In 1894 the property was still managed by Rose, and was operating as a sheep station.

The Calvert expedition arrived at the station in 1896 and immediately set up a search party for a group of men who were supposed to arrive ahead of the main party.

In 1905 the property was owned by Arnold Jeffes Rose, who remained in the area until 1911. The property remained in the family, with son Richard Jeffes Rose taking over in adulthood.

Roses were managers at Quanbun in 1954 when SP Walker from United Aborigines Mission Station at Fitzroy Crossing visited.

The property was owned by Keith Anderson in 2010; Anderson also owned Jubilee Downs Station. Together the properties occupy an area of 2,200 square kilometres (849 sq mi) and were stocked with 12,000 Droughtmaster cattle.

In 2020, Andrew Forrest acquired both Quanbun and Jubilee Downs for over A$30 million.

== See also ==
- List of ranches and stations
- List of pastoral leases in Western Australia
