= List of homesteads in Western Australia: P–Q =

This list includes all homesteads in Western Australia with a gazetted name. It is complete with respect to the 1996 Gazetteer of Australia. Dubious names have been checked against the online 2004 data, and in all cases confirmed correct. However, if any homesteads have been gazetted or deleted since 1996, this list does not reflect these changes. Strictly speaking, Australian place names are gazetted in capital letters only; the names in this list have been converted to mixed case in accordance with normal capitalisation conventions.

Name	Location	Remarks
Padburys Station	30°9′S 115°6′E	
Paddy Outcamp	24°5′S 114°42′E	
Padgee	34°22′S 116°26′E	
Palamar	31°10′S 116°8′E	
Pallinup	33°57′S 117°51′E	
Pallomar	33°57′S 117°49′E	
Palm Spring	18°25′S 127°51′E	
Palmdale	34°47′S 118°7′E	
Palmhill	33°36′S 115°36′E	
Palmirup	33°47′S 117°9′E	
Palmyre	33°58′S 117°5′E	
Palomar	33°45′S 115°58′E	
Palomar	33°56′S 117°23′E	
Pamford	33°20′S 117°51′E	
Pankie	30°44′S 116°14′E	
Pannikin Springs	33°47′S 115°22′E	
Pannoo	34°42′S 118°1′E	
Panorama	34°33′S 118°1′E	
Panoro	33°27′S 117°3′E	
Pantijan	15°58′S 125°3′E	
Panyan	29°29′S 116°4′E	
Paper Collar Clays	34°17′S 118°11′E	
Paper Park	31°29′S 115°54′E	
Para Nama	33°49′S 120°23′E	
Parabana	34°5′S 118°37′E	
Paradise	33°22′S 115°47′E	
Paradise	18°1′S 124°32′E	
Paradise Bend	32°43′S 117°1′E	
Paradise Valley	33°38′S 115°56′E	
Parakalia	29°32′S 115°43′E	
Paralna	33°11′S 115°51′E	
Pardoo	20°6′S 119°35′E	
Pardoo Outcamp	19°59′S 119°55′E	
Paringa	33°31′S 116°17′E	
Paringa Park	33°41′S 116°36′E	
Parkeston	33°10′S 118°7′E	
Parkfield	33°12′S 115°42′E	
Parklands	32°39′S 116°37′E	
Parklands	33°38′S 115°34′E	
Parkside	33°36′S 115°36′E	
Parmango	33°44′S 122°38′E	
Parnaroo	34°24′S 119°4′E	
Paroo	26°16′S 119°46′E	
Parua Downs	33°10′S 118°45′E	
Paskeville	33°43′S 115°12′E	
Passchendale	33°38′S 117°41′E	
Passchendeele	29°34′S 116°0′E	
Passmore	31°26′S 116°47′E	
Patricia Downs Farm	29°54′S 115°33′E	
Patricia Farm	31°29′S 116°38′E	
Peacehaven	33°19′S 117°3′E	
Peach Hill	34°16′S 117°9′E	
Peak Downs	33°49′S 122°17′E	
Peak View	34°12′S 118°25′E	
Pearlcliffe	29°12′S 115°10′E	
Peebles Farm	33°42′S 115°4′E	
Peedamulla	21°51′S 115°37′E	
Peedamulla Outcamp	21°48′S 115°31′E	
Peenebup	34°8′S 118°20′E	
Pekaring Hill	32°5′S 117°45′E	
Pember Warren	34°27′S 115°56′E	
Pembridge	33°52′S 115°4′E	
Pendalup	34°2′S 118°27′E	
Pendeen	34°57′S 117°52′E	
Pendle Hill	33°53′S 120°21′E	
Pendower	33°44′S 115°21′E	
Penelup Farms	34°44′S 117°26′E	
Peninsula	33°56′S 116°4′E	
Peninsula Downs	34°7′S 115°11′E	
Penley	34°1′S 118°45′E	
Penmore	34°33′S 117°19′E	
Pennedale	34°59′S 117°40′E	
Penola	33°33′S 115°32′E	
Penrose	33°24′S 121°17′E	
Penrose Park	33°48′S 120°24′E	
Pentecost Downs	16°17′S 127°12′E	
Penwortham	33°47′S 116°32′E	
Pepperfields	33°43′S 115°13′E	
Peppermint Dell	33°26′S 115°45′E	
Peppermint Grove	34°26′S 119°22′E	
Peppermint Park	33°5′S 115°59′E	
Peppermint Park	34°7′S 115°7′E	
Peppertree Outcamp	29°3′S 120°29′E	
Peppin Park	32°10′S 117°35′E	
Peppinella West	33°55′S 118°46′E	
Perangery	29°22′S 116°24′E	
Pericles	31°51′S 118°6′E	
Perillup	34°34′S 117°14′E	
Perillup	34°31′S 117°9′E	
Perillup	34°30′S 117°14′E	
Perillup Estate	34°34′S 117°14′E	
Peringa Park	34°23′S 117°33′E	
Perivale	33°42′S 115°47′E	
Perkolilli	30°42′S 121°39′E	
Peron	25°50′S 113°33′E	
Perrinvale Outcamp	29°1′S 120°2′E	
Petarli	33°19′S 121°30′E	
Petersfield	34°32′S 117°29′E	
Petersham	34°11′S 118°29′E	
Peterson Outcamp	28°53′S 120°46′E	
Petone	34°16′S 117°51′E	
Petworthy	30°15′S 116°42′E	
Piawaning	30°53′S 116°24′E	
Pickmore	33°45′S 115°14′E	
Picnic Farm	31°30′S 116°54′E	
Picup	34°25′S 118°58′E	
Pilga	21°29′S 119°25′E	
Pimbee	25°29′S 114°52′E	
Pinchers Brook	33°31′S 115°57′E	
Pinconning	33°27′S 115°44′E	
Pindabunna	29°20′S 118°7′E	
Pindallup	33°58′S 117°29′E	
Pindarri	30°56′S 115°25′E	
Pindarrup	34°24′S 118°40′E	
Pindathuna	28°3′S 116°39′E	
Pine Cottage	35°1′S 117°44′E	
Pine Creek	33°49′S 115°47′E	
Pine Farm	33°44′S 117°41′E	
Pine Hill	33°31′S 121°49′E	
Pine Hill	33°55′S 117°39′E	
Pine Lodge	34°39′S 117°27′E	
Pine Park	29°39′S 116°16′E	
Pine Ridge	33°10′S 115°51′E	
Pine Ridge	33°48′S 117°30′E	
Pine Springs	29°9′S 115°26′E	
Pine View	32°1′S 118°23′E	
Pinegrove	27°47′S 115°40′E	
Pinehill	33°35′S 115°36′E	
Pinelock	33°49′S 115°47′E	
Pingamup	33°57′S 118°51′E	
Pingandy	24°0′S 117°31′E	
Pingarnup	33°39′S 118°33′E	
Pinjin	30°5′S 122°44′E	
Pinkawillinie	33°49′S 118°24′E	
Pinkwerry	31°1′S 116°42′E	
Pinnacles	28°12′S 120°26′E	
Pippingarra	20°28′S 118°41′E	
Pirrilyungka	26°32′S 128°26′E	
Plainfoss	31°43′S 116°31′E	
Plainview	32°44′S 117°52′E	
Plantation	31°19′S 116°7′E	
Pleasant Valley	33°43′S 121°34′E	
Pleasant View	34°50′S 118°11′E	
Pleasant View	34°51′S 117°59′E	
Pleiades Outcamp	23°33′S 114°46′E	
Plympton	33°42′S 115°50′E	
Plyowola	29°33′S 115°59′E	
Polelle	26°55′S 118°33′E	
Police Station Woolshed	24°44′S 116°15′E	
Poltalloch	33°33′S 116°36′E	
Ponda Rosa	30°34′S 115°59′E	
Ponderosa	33°15′S 116°54′E	
Ponderosa	34°59′S 117°33′E	
Poneke	29°31′S 115°55′E	
Poonawarriup	33°58′S 117°36′E	
Poorarecup	34°23′S 117°13′E	
Poplar	33°40′S 120°34′E	
Poplar Valley	33°19′S 116°9′E	
Poplars	34°44′S 117°49′E	
Porto Bella Farm	31°56′S 116°58′E	
Poverty Point	33°51′S 116°36′E	
Powhatunui	33°56′S 116°58′E	
Prairie Downs	23°33′S 119°9′E	
Praters	34°0′S 115°8′E	
Premier Downs	30°34′S 125°30′E	
Prenti Downs	26°31′S 122°48′E	
Preston	33°13′S 117°0′E	
Preston	31°34′S 116°42′E	
Preston Farm	33°33′S 115°52′E	
Preston Pines	33°32′S 116°0′E	
Preston Vale	32°34′S 115°56′E	
Pretty Gully	34°8′S 116°43′E	
Priory Park	33°46′S 117°4′E	
Privett	33°55′S 117°57′E	
Prospect	31°18′S 116°9′E	
Prospect Hill	33°32′S 117°20′E	
Proudlove Downs	33°24′S 119°53′E	
Prowaka Spring	29°36′S 115°54′E	
Proyart	33°38′S 117°18′E	
Pulfer	33°6′S 115°54′E	
Pullagaroo	29°11′S 117°55′E	
Pulpapunka Outstation	26°8′S 126°51′E	
Purpareena	34°29′S 117°26′E	
Putlands	33°12′S 116°46′E	
Pyara	30°22′S 116°7′E	
Pynup	34°19′S 117°35′E	
Pyramid	21°3′S 117°26′E	
Qodesh	16°53′S 125°48′E	
Quaalup	34°16′S 119°24′E	
Quabbin	33°40′S 117°33′E	
Quabing	33°22′S 117°8′E	
Quadney	31°48′S 116°37′E	
Quahlea	33°41′S 121°43′E	
Quailerup	33°29′S 117°11′E	
Quailleup Farm	33°57′S 117°4′E	
Qualem Downs	32°18′S 117°17′E	
Qualin	31°10′S 116°39′E	
Qualinup Park	34°25′S 119°4′E	
Quanandrup	33°50′S 117°10′E	
Quanbun	18°23′S 125°13′E	
Quangellup	34°36′S 117°36′E	
Quarry Park	31°17′S 116°51′E	
Queerearrup Park	33°30′S 117°12′E	
Quel Quelling	31°26′S 116°48′E	
Quenby Holme	34°18′S 117°18′E	
Querijup	33°56′S 116°30′E	
Quforty	32°48′S 115°40′E	
Quigup	33°59′S 115°43′E	
Quin Brook	31°19′S 115°42′E	
Quindabelup	34°35′S 116°58′E	
Quindal Wood	33°38′S 115°58′E	
Quinjarra Farms	33°1′S 116°28′E	
Quinninup Park	33°44′S 115°2′E	
Quinwindup	33°57′S 116°51′E	
Quobba	24°24′S 113°24′E	
Quokerlip Hill	35°3′S 117°34′E	
Quondong	31°15′S 116°32′E	
Quongup	33°52′S 115°52′E	

== See also ==
- List of pastoral leases in Western Australia
