= Swainsona calcicola =

Scientific classification
- Kingdom: Plantae
- Clade: Tracheophytes
- Clade: Angiosperms
- Clade: Eudicots
- Clade: Rosids
- Order: Fabales
- Family: Fabaceae
- Subfamily: Faboideae
- Genus: Swainsona
- Species: S. calcicola

Binomial name
- Swainsona calcicola Joy Thomps.

Species of plant

Swainsona calcicola is a species of flowering plant in the family Fabaceae and is endemic to north-western Western Australia. It is a prostrate or ascending, low-growing perennial with many stems, imparipinnate leaves usually with 7 to 11 broadly egg-shaped leaflets with the narrower end towards the base, and racemes of usually 4 or 5 pink, purple or red flowers.

== Description ==
Swainsona calcicola is a prostrate or ascending, low-growing perennial plant, that has many stems arising from a tap root. Its leaves are imparipinnate, mostly up to 100 mm (3.9 in) long with stipules often more than 10 mm (0.39 in) long at the base. There are mostly 7 to 11 broadly egg-shaped leaflets with the narrower end towards the base, the lower leaflets about 7–12 mm (0.28–0.47 in) and 4–8 mm (0.16–0.31 in) wide. The flowers are arranged in racemes 5–25 mm (0.20–0.98 in) long of 4 to 5, each flower 12–15 mm (0.47–0.59 in) long. The sepals are softly-hairy and joined at the base, forming a tube 2.0–2.5 mm (0.079–0.098 in) long with the sepal lobes about equal to or longer than the sepal tube. The petals are pink, purple or red, the standard petal 10–15 mm (0.39–0.59 in) long, the wings 8–11 mm (0.31–0.43 in) long, and the keel 10–15 mm (0.39–0.59 in) long. Flowering occurs in August and September, and the fruit is an oblong pod about 25 mm (0.98 in) long with the remains of the style about 7 mm (0.28 in) long.

== Taxonomy and naming ==
Swainsona calcicola was first formally described in 1990 by Joy Thompson in the journal Telopea, from a specimen collected by Alex George near Ningaloo Station homestead in 1970. The specific epithet (calcicola) means "limestone-dweller".

== Distribution and habitat ==
This species grows in sand on coastal limestone and dunes on the coast and off-shore islands of Western Australia in the Carnarvon and Yalgoo bioregions of north-western Western Australia.
