= List of homesteads in Western Australia: H–J =

This list includes all homesteads in Western Australia with a gazetted name. It is complete with respect to the 1996 Gazetteer of Australia. Dubious names have been checked against the online 2004 data, and in all cases confirmed correct. However, if any homesteads have been gazetted or deleted since 1996, this list does not reflect these changes. Strictly speaking, Australian place names are gazetted in capital letters only; the names in this list have been converted to mixed case in accordance with normal capitalisation conventions.

Name	Location	Remarks
Haddleton Stud	33°40′S 116°35′E	
Haddows Patch	33°17′S 121°8′E	
Haere Mia	34°1′S 115°7′E	
Haily	32°13′S 117°6′E	
Haisthorpe	32°3′S 116°52′E	
Hakea Park	33°15′S 120°2′E	
Halcyon	34°1′S 115°11′E	
Hale	34°32′S 117°50′E	
Haleakala	33°35′S 115°55′E	
Half Moon	33°51′S 117°7′E	
Hallyard	34°21′S 117°23′E	
Halycon	31°19′S 116°31′E	
Hambledon	33°33′S 115°59′E	
Hamelin	26°26′S 114°11′E	
Hamelin Outcamp	26°29′S 114°30′E	
Hamelin Park	33°4′S 116°46′E	
Hamersley	22°17′S 117°41′E	
Hampden	33°1′S 115°44′E	
Hampton Hill	30°45′S 121°45′E	
Hampton Park	34°40′S 117°19′E	
Hampton Plains	32°17′S 117°44′E	
Hampton Vineyard	31°38′S 116°37′E	
Hanley	32°25′S 116°34′E	
Hanna	33°41′S 120°46′E	
Hannaby Park	33°33′S 115°33′E	
Happy Days	34°56′S 117°54′E	
Happy Valley	33°39′S 117°25′E	
Happy Valley	33°34′S 117°21′E	
Happy Valley	34°57′S 117°11′E	
Harbour Flat	33°17′S 115°46′E	
Hardey	22°44′S 116°7′E	
Hardy Cottage	32°41′S 115°39′E	
Harelay	33°44′S 115°17′E	
Hargate Park	33°42′S 121°32′E	
Harrock Farm	33°35′S 117°34′E	
Harrow	33°19′S 115°44′E	
Harton South	34°59′S 117°44′E	
Hartville	34°16′S 117°11′E	
Hasely	31°25′S 116°30′E	
Hastings	32°33′S 116°49′E	
Hastings	33°13′S 118°3′E	
Hatchford	33°43′S 115°27′E	
Hathersay	30°41′S 116°53′E	
Havelock	30°42′S 115°59′E	
Havelock	31°20′S 116°44′E	
Haven Park	33°24′S 117°13′E	
Havendale	33°34′S 115°46′E	
Hawick Hill	33°24′S 117°29′E	
Hawkhurst	31°50′S 116°48′E	
Hawksbury	34°37′S 117°34′E	
Hawterville	33°46′S 115°57′E	
Hawthorn	33°38′S 115°55′E	
Hawthornden	31°31′S 116°28′E	
Hay River Estate	34°44′S 117°34′E	
Hayfield	33°56′S 117°29′E	
Hazel Wood	34°1′S 115°10′E	
Hazeldene	32°8′S 118°25′E	
Hazeldine	33°52′S 117°6′E	
Hazelvale	33°43′S 117°34′E	
Heatherleigh	33°33′S 115°36′E	
Heathlor Downs	33°44′S 121°59′E	
Helena	31°44′S 116°29′E	
Hendersyde	32°29′S 118°26′E	
Hensingham	33°18′S 115°46′E	
Henty Farm	33°21′S 115°50′E	
Henty Vale	33°55′S 116°44′E	
Hentydale	33°19′S 115°48′E	
Heracombe	32°58′S 116°48′E	
Herald Bay Outcamp	25°52′S 113°6′E	
Herekino	33°52′S 120°9′E	
Heritage Stud	31°18′S 115°56′E	
Herne Hills	33°34′S 115°51′E	
Herons Rock	33°51′S 117°53′E	
Heybrook	32°9′S 117°48′E	
Hi-view	33°43′S 116°41′E	
Hidala	33°34′S 121°34′E	
Hide-a-way	32°51′S 118°10′E	
High Glee	33°38′S 115°4′E	
High Jolly	33°53′S 115°5′E	
High Valley	34°4′S 115°48′E	
High View	29°4′S 115°20′E	
Highbury Fields	34°39′S 117°29′E	
Highland Park	33°22′S 121°35′E	
Highland Park	33°46′S 115°19′E	
Highland Valley	33°19′S 115°52′E	
Highlands Stud	33°58′S 118°31′E	
Hilda Vale	30°35′S 116°13′E	
Hildawn	30°20′S 116°59′E	
Hill 50	34°18′S 118°56′E	
Hill 60	31°19′S 116°31′E	
Hill Grove	32°12′S 118°11′E	
Hill Head	32°11′S 116°48′E	
Hill Spring	33°36′S 115°57′E	
Hill Springs	24°18′S 114°30′E	
Hill Top	34°1′S 118°51′E	
Hill View	33°49′S 117°38′E	
Hill View	29°46′S 116°5′E	
Hill View	32°25′S 117°17′E	
Hill View	33°52′S 117°49′E	
Hill View	30°34′S 116°13′E	
Hill View	31°20′S 116°51′E	
Hill View Park	31°35′S 118°21′E	
Hillcrest	33°37′S 115°55′E	
Hillcrest	33°35′S 117°44′E	
Hillcrest	33°39′S 115°55′E	
Hillcrest	29°59′S 116°41′E	
Hillcrest	33°34′S 116°32′E	
Hillcrest	33°36′S 117°30′E	
Hillcrest	29°51′S 116°5′E	
Hillcroft	32°21′S 116°51′E	
Hilldale	34°35′S 117°42′E	
Hills Estate	33°45′S 115°18′E	
Hillsea	34°37′S 118°41′E	
Hillside	31°59′S 116°44′E	
Hillside	31°29′S 116°56′E	
Hillside	29°32′S 116°0′E	
Hillside	33°31′S 115°58′E	
Hillside	33°40′S 117°33′E	
Hillside	33°12′S 115°43′E	
Hillside	33°15′S 115°52′E	
Hillside	33°34′S 117°34′E	
Hillside	21°43′S 119°24′E	
Hillside	33°39′S 117°37′E	
Hillside	33°1′S 116°42′E	
Hillside	31°30′S 116°6′E	
Hillside	30°29′S 116°12′E	
Hillside	33°22′S 117°42′E	
Hillside Outcamp	22°5′S 119°18′E	
Hillside Park	33°12′S 115°52′E	
Hilltop Park	33°24′S 117°13′E	
Hillview	31°9′S 116°37′E	
Hillview	31°30′S 116°44′E	
Hillview	33°50′S 120°24′E	
Hillview	34°33′S 117°42′E	
Hillview	32°15′S 116°57′E	
Hillview	34°55′S 117°2′E	
Hillview	30°28′S 116°45′E	
Hillview	26°54′S 118°50′E	
Hillview Outstation	22°6′S 115°55′E	
Hilton	34°0′S 116°19′E	
Hithergreen	33°43′S 115°30′E	
Hithergreen	33°43′S 115°30′E	
Hitor	33°38′S 117°2′E	
Hohenfels	30°48′S 115°49′E	
Holbrook	33°4′S 115°53′E	
Hollands Track Farm	33°9′S 118°51′E	
Holloway	34°2′S 116°43′E	
Hollywood	33°43′S 117°16′E	
Holme Park	34°6′S 117°51′E	
Holmesdale	33°49′S 115°58′E	
Holmhill	32°57′S 117°16′E	
Holmhurst	33°56′S 117°31′E	
Holmwood	34°1′S 115°5′E	
Home Valley	15°43′S 127°50′E	
Homeacres	33°42′S 121°50′E	
Homebush	32°12′S 117°21′E	
Homebush	32°59′S 115°53′E	
Homebush	34°15′S 117°14′E	
Homedale	30°40′S 116°0′E	
Homefield	32°31′S 117°40′E	
Homelands	32°47′S 117°47′E	
Homeleigh	30°12′S 116°32′E	
Homevale West	34°28′S 117°22′E	
Homeward	32°16′S 116°44′E	
Homewood	33°44′S 117°26′E	
Homewood	30°37′S 116°1′E	
Honeycomb	31°21′S 115°54′E	
Hooley	21°53′S 118°13′E	
Hope Farm	33°31′S 117°31′E	
Hope Farm	31°37′S 116°57′E	
Hope Valley	33°51′S 115°10′E	
Hopefuleigh	33°16′S 119°50′E	
Hopelands	32°21′S 116°55′E	
Hopewell	32°28′S 117°36′E	
Horrsby Heights	34°29′S 116°51′E	
Horseshoe	33°34′S 117°13′E	
Horseshoe Farm	32°43′S 117°59′E	
Horsford	32°5′S 116°50′E	
Hosslen	33°44′S 121°39′E	
Hotham Dale	32°34′S 116°53′E	
Hounsome	33°36′S 117°32′E	
Howland Park	32°27′S 117°40′E	
Hukochini	34°17′S 115°9′E	
Hulongin	31°21′S 116°48′E	
Hunting Lodge	31°41′S 116°56′E	
Hunton	34°56′S 118°1′E	
Hunts Foxhaven Estate	33°40′S 115°2′E	
Huntswell	29°6′S 115°6′E	
Hurbon	29°4′S 114°51′E	
Hursley Downs	31°27′S 115°57′E	
Huscote	33°35′S 119°32′E	
Hutchycup	34°9′S 116°44′E	
Hy Brazil	28°5′S 117°54′E	
Hylands	33°21′S 117°33′E	
Hyview	32°27′S 118°9′E	
Hyview Downs	33°25′S 118°31′E	
Ida Valley	28°42′S 120°30′E	
Idylwild	30°43′S 115°36′E	
Ileura	33°35′S 118°16′E	
Ilgarari Outcamp	24°21′S 119°35′E	
Illa-lange	33°28′S 117°10′E	
Illalawley	33°2′S 116°55′E	
Illalone	34°15′S 117°56′E	
Illangi	33°49′S 115°21′E	
Illareen	33°45′S 117°31′E	
Illawarra	31°15′S 116°50′E	
Illginup	33°39′S 115°26′E	
Illtamurra	34°1′S 117°2′E	
Illyarrie	29°47′S 115°41′E	
Illyarrie	29°19′S 115°3′E	
Inamess	29°49′S 115°27′E	
Inchyra	34°12′S 115°9′E	
Indarrie	30°40′S 116°18′E	
Indee	20°47′S 118°36′E	
Indialla	28°31′S 114°52′E	
Indinup	33°43′S 117°28′E	
Ingalara	30°33′S 115°52′E	
Inglebourne	34°14′S 118°7′E	
Inglewood	32°31′S 117°48′E	
Inglewood	32°30′S 117°48′E	
Inglewood	27°43′S 118°44′E	
Inglewood	29°53′S 116°0′E	
Inlet Park	33°39′S 115°25′E	
Innishargie	33°51′S 115°12′E	
Innouendy	25°42′S 116°32′E	
Innouendy Outcamp	25°49′S 116°15′E	
Invermay	32°52′S 117°21′E	
Inverness	29°38′S 115°54′E	
Inverness	29°44′S 115°29′E	
Iowna	28°21′S 117°57′E	
Ipswich View	31°34′S 116°27′E	
Iragana	30°36′S 115°46′E	
Irimple	33°0′S 119°22′E	
Irwin Farm	33°30′S 115°37′E	
Irwin House	29°13′S 115°6′E	
Irwin Park	34°58′S 117°19′E	
Irwin Park	29°14′S 115°4′E	
Irwin Plains	29°10′S 115°11′E	
Ivanhoe	33°19′S 118°50′E	
Ivanhoe	33°47′S 120°49′E	
Ivanhoe	15°41′S 128°41′E	
Iveston	33°0′S 116°51′E	
J.R.s Homestead	34°4′S 115°9′E	
Jabulani	33°37′S 121°38′E	
Jacaranda Park	34°43′S 117°31′E	
Jaffa	34°20′S 117°36′E	
Jailor Outcamp	26°32′S 116°19′E	
Jakkawilla	34°38′S 118°22′E	
Jalna	32°23′S 116°50′E	
Jaloran	33°9′S 117°26′E	
Jam Creek	33°58′S 117°43′E	
Jam Hills	33°35′S 117°40′E	
Jam Vale	34°16′S 118°30′E	
Jam Valley	33°43′S 116°48′E	
Jamindi	25°5′S 118°51′E	
Jandalee	34°32′S 118°39′E	
Jarangar	17°50′S 122°13′E	
Jardup	33°5′S 115°59′E	
Jarra Leah	34°50′S 118°1′E	
Jarrahdale	34°54′S 117°55′E	
Jarrahvale	34°57′S 118°1′E	
Jawaro	34°14′S 118°7′E	
Jay Bee	33°18′S 115°46′E	
Jecundars Park	30°24′S 116°49′E	
Jeda Mia	34°48′S 117°50′E	
Jeddiup	34°41′S 117°21′E	
Jeedamya	29°24′S 121°16′E	
Jellicoe	34°30′S 117°38′E	
Jemmalong	33°16′S 121°38′E	
Jenabillup	33°40′S 121°55′E	
Jendesco	30°57′S 115°42′E	
Jeneric	34°19′S 116°45′E	
Jennaberring	31°54′S 117°29′E	
Jennella	34°24′S 118°56′E	
Jennyville	29°13′S 115°26′E	
Jerdacuttup	33°36′S 120°11′E	
Jerildene	33°12′S 116°44′E	
Jesselton	33°54′S 116°12′E	
Jessica	33°56′S 115°14′E	
Jibberding Farm	29°58′S 116°52′E	
Jiggernoo Outcamp	27°16′S 115°54′E	
Jilbadgie	31°33′S 119°15′E	
Jilbadji	29°56′S 115°48′E	
Jillawarra	29°14′S 115°30′E	
Jilyara	33°46′S 115°4′E	
Jimba Jimba	25°3′S 115°8′E	
Jimberlana	32°9′S 121°49′E	
Jimberlana West	33°49′S 122°12′E	
Jims Oven	33°47′S 122°17′E	
Jindabine	34°58′S 117°6′E	
Jindabye	32°50′S 118°26′E	
Jindabyne	33°43′S 121°23′E	
Jindalee	33°32′S 115°59′E	
Jindalee	33°48′S 120°26′E	
Jindalee	33°58′S 118°50′E	
Jingalup	33°58′S 117°2′E	
Jingaree	33°39′S 115°8′E	
Jingemarra	27°45′S 116°45′E	
Joanna Plains	30°43′S 115°31′E	
Johnita	33°32′S 115°40′E	
Jojoba	29°47′S 115°20′E	
Jonalyn Park	33°45′S 115°14′E	
Jonegatup	33°39′S 121°0′E	
Jons Home	33°51′S 117°27′E	
Josbury	33°6′S 116°49′E	
Juadine	31°42′S 116°37′E	
Jubilee Downs	18°21′S 125°18′E	
Judeen	29°56′S 115°25′E	
Juegenup	33°14′S 115°46′E	
Julia Range	32°53′S 117°6′E	
Julijoogalup	33°40′S 115°25′E	
Julimar	31°30′S 116°16′E	
Jumgull Hill	31°48′S 116°46′E	
Jumperdine	31°15′S 116°10′E	
Juna Downs	22°53′S 118°29′E	
Jundee	26°21′S 120°38′E	
Juniper	33°50′S 115°1′E	
Jurunup	32°35′S 115°57′E	
Jusak	33°9′S 118°53′E	

== See also ==
- List of pastoral leases in Western Australia
