= Badja =

Badja could refer to:

- Badja Station, a pastoral lease in Western Australia
- Big Badja Hill, a mountain in New South Wales
- Big Badja River, a river in New South Wales
