= Korong Station =

Pastoral lease in Western Australia

Coordinates: 28.612°S 122.005°E

Location in Western Australia

Korong Station was a pastoral lease that operated as a sheep station in Western Australia.

It is situated approximately 39 kilometres (24 mi) west of Laverton and 72 kilometres (45 mi) east of Leonora in the Goldfields-Esperance region. The property adjoins Mount Crawford Station.

Gold was being mined at leases named Korong on the Mount Margaret goldfields in 1898.

The station was established sometime prior to 1914 and was breeding sheep at this time but not heavily stocked as a result of insufficient rain. In 1926 the property was supporting a flock of 5,000 sheep.

The homestead burnt to the ground in 1928 following a fire that started in the kitchen. The station manager's wife, Mrs Williams, was the only one home when the fire started. The station manager, Mr Williams, was a shareholder in the pastoral company that owned Korong. The property was running about 7,000 sheep at this time, despite it being a dry year.

By 1935 the property was running a flock of 12,000 sheep and shearing produced 250 bales of wool.

Koorong, along with neighbouring Mount Crawford, was owned by Hugo Green in 1947; Green had acquired the property from the Mount Crawford Pastoral Company. In 1948 both properties had a combined flock of 12,000 sheep.

== See also ==
- List of ranches and stations
- List of pastoral leases in Western Australia
