= Callawa Station =

Pastoral lease in Western Australia

Coordinates: 20.6344°S 120.5134°E

Location in Western Australia

Callawa Station is a pastoral lease that was once a sheep station but now operates as a cattle station in Western Australia.

It is located approximately 99 kilometres (62 mi) north east of Marble Bar and 200 km (124 mi) east of Port Hedland on the De Grey River in the Pilbara region of Western Australia. The property lies between Yarrie Station and Shay Gap. The station is the western terminus of the Gary Junction Road that runs west 1,350 kilometres (839 mi) from Liebig Hill. The property shares a boundary with Devahl Station.

The station was established at some time prior to 1909.

The Darlington family were owners of the property for a long period of time, from at least 1923 until 1952.

The 55,530-acre (22,472 ha) station is currently one of the Strelley properties, five pastoral leases held by Indigenous Australian groups including the Strelley Pastoral Company. Other properties in the group are Carlindi Station, Strelley and Lalla Rookh Station.

== See also ==
- List of ranches and stations
- List of pastoral leases in Western Australia
