= Bonney Downs Station =

Pastoral lease in Western Australia

Coordinates: 22.1832°S 119.9334°E

Location in Western Australia

Bonney Downs Station is a pastoral lease that was once a sheep station but now operates as a cattle station in Western Australia.

It is located approximately 115 kilometres (70 mi) south of Marble Bar and 130 km (80 mi) north of Newman on the Nullagine River in the Pilbara region of Western Australia. Neighbouring properties include Momalanna Station.

The heritage listed homestead is found on the property. The homestead has been classified by the National Trust and is on the Register of the National Estate.

In 1912 the station had a flock of 5,200 sheep and produced 93 bales of wool during shearing.

In 2015 the station sold off many of its Santa Gertrudis and Droughtmaster cattle following a season of unpredictable rainfall. The station manager, Peter Goyder, who also manages Warradarge Station, intended to sell off stock at a rate of 200 a week for six months.

In 2019 it featured on Prospero Productions's Outback Pilots series.

== See also ==
- List of ranches and stations
- List of pastoral leases in Western Australia
