= Pilga Station =

Pastoral lease in Western Australia

Coordinates: 21.481°S 119.414°E

Location in Western Australia

Pilga Station is a pastoral lease and sheep station located 48 km (30 mi) south west of Marble Bar and 210 km (130 mi) north of Newman in the Pilbara region of Western Australia.

The station occupies an area of 87,018 hectares (215,025 acres) and in 1946 had 256 km (159 mi) of fencing and the property was divided into 16 paddocks. The property also had 23 wells, was equipped with mills, a homestead and shearing shed. The Shaw River flows through a portion of Pilga.

In 1928 sheep from Pilga produced 134 bales of wool.

Shearers shore 15,400 sheep at Pilga in 1934, including 3,000 summer lambs producing 151 bales of wool; the clip was 3 long tons (3 t) better than the previous record.

In 1954 the station owner, J. J. Doughty, took miners to the Wardens court to seek the forfeiture of 16 mining tenements for non-compliance of labour conditions and continual use of water rights at the Cooglegong tin-field situated on the property.

== See also ==
- List of pastoral leases in Western Australia
