= Noreena Downs Station =

Pastoral lease in Western Australia

Coordinates: 22.292°S 120.1768°E

Location in Western Australia

Noreena Downs Station, often referred to as Noreena Downs, is a pastoral lease that has been used as both a sheep station and a cattle station.

It is located about 127 kilometres (79 mi) north of Newman and 135 kilometres (84 mi) south of Marble Bar in the Pilbara region of Western Australia.

The property was pioneered by A.W. Townshend and comprised 800,000 acres (323,749 ha); Townsend used it to graze cattle. Townshend and Jarman put the property on the market in 1910 then in 1911 it was purchased by Hardie, Walker, McLarty and Haynes. They introduced sheep to the property and by 1914 had a flock of 7,000 sheep and 3,000 cattle. In 1916 the station was stocked with 9,000 sheep. By the 1930s Noreena Downs was owned by Hardie and Middleditch and was a million acre sheep station running about 30,000 sheep.

Currently the property is owned by the Paull family and occupies an area of 910,128 acres (368,316 ha). The Paulls have been at Noreena Downs since 1981, when Tex and Tub Paull acquired it in partnership. By 1983 the Paulls owned the property outright although it was run down with no paddocks, working water points or homestead. They introduced a mixed herd of cattle, mostly Brahman and Droughtmaster.

== See also ==
- List of ranches and stations
- List of pastoral leases in Western Australia
