= Eucalyptus selachiana =

Scientific classification
- Kingdom: Plantae
- Clade: Tracheophytes
- Clade: Angiosperms
- Clade: Eudicots
- Clade: Rosids
- Order: Myrtales
- Family: Myrtaceae
- Genus: Eucalyptus
- Species: E. selachiana

Binomial name
- Eucalyptus selachiana L.A.S.Johnson & K.D.Hill

Species of eucalyptus

Eucalyptus selachiana is a mallee that is native to a small area in the Gascoyne region of Western Australia.

The mallee typically grows to a height of 1.7 to 3 metres (6 to 10 ft) and has glossy adult leaves. It blooms between February and April producing simple triad inflorescences with white flowers.

It is found among low open woodlands in the Gascoyne region between Carnarvon and Shark Bay where it grows in sandy calcareous soils.

Eucalyptus selachiana was first formally described in 1998 by Lawrie Johnson and Ken Hill in the journal Telopea, but it is now accepted by the Australian Plant Census as a synonym of the as yet (December 2019) undescribed E. eudesmioides subsp. Selachiana (M.I.H.Brooker 8129).

== See also ==
- List of Eucalyptus species
