= Coongan =

Coongan could refer to:

- Coongan River, A river in Western Australia
- Coongan Station, a pastoral lease in Western Australia
