= Adelong Station =

Pastoral lease in Western Australia

Coordinates: 29°33′28″S 120°52′58″E

Location in Western Australia

Adelong or Adelong Station is a pastoral lease and sheep station located about 21 kilometres (13 mi) west of Menzies and 86 kilometres (53 mi) south west of Leonora in the Goldfields of Western Australia.

The station adjoins Goongarrie National Park, which was also once a station that was taken up in 1924 but that was never fully developed as it was too difficult to establish watering points. Adelong is currently owned and managed by the Menzies Aboriginal Corporation. Adelong is operating under the Crown Lease number CL186-1969 and has the Land Act number LA3114/801.

Lake Ballard is on the northern boundary of the station. The property has a mix of mulga, saltbush and bluebush as well as native grasses suitable for feed. The Adelong Dunes, a stable and vegetated dune system, lie to the south of the station.

The station occupied an area of 182,000 acres (73,653 ha) in 1929 and had five wells, each with its own windmill attached. At the time, the property was only stocked with 200 head of cattle and 20 horses and it was sold for £7000 to Messrs. Camera and Maitland. The pair had previously owned two large properties in the Gascoyne, Eudamullah and Arthur River, which they had sold. They intended to convert Adelong to a sheep run.

Mr C. Bloxam owned the station in 1939 and bought 25 Bungaree blood rams for the property and made several small sales of wool in that year.

The station was put up for auction in 1940.

Charles Burrows took over Adelong in 1948, by which time its area was 225,000 acres (91,054 ha), but the property had been abandoned for some years. Burrows intended to stock the station with 400 cattle and 2,000 sheep but had noted the abundance of artesian water available at the property.

== See also ==
- List of ranches and stations
- List of pastoral leases in Western Australia
