= Cyperus ixiocarpus =

Scientific classification
- Kingdom: Plantae
- Clade: Embryophytes
- Clade: Tracheophytes
- Clade: Spermatophytes
- Clade: Angiosperms
- Clade: Monocots
- Clade: Commelinids
- Order: Poales
- Family: Cyperaceae
- Genus: Cyperus
- Species: C. ixiocarpus

Binomial name
- Cyperus ixiocarpus F.Muell.

Species of plant

Cyperus ixiocarpus is a sedge of the family Cyperaceae that is native to northern parts of Australia.

The robust perennial sedge typically grows to a height of 0.45 to 1 metre (1.5 to 3.3 ft) and has a viscid tufted habit. The plant blooms between February and July producing yellow-green-brown flowers.

The species was first described by the botanist Ferdinand von Mueller in 1887 as a part of the work, Transactions Of The Royal Society Of Victoria.

It is found across northern Australia in Western Australia, Queensland and the Northern Territory in seasonally dry tropical areas. In Western Australia it is found along sandy creek and river beds in the Gascoyne and Pilbara regions where it grows in red sandy-loamy soils.

== See also ==
- List of Cyperus species
