= Ningaloo Station =

Pastoral lease in Western Australia

Coordinates: 22°41′49.64″S 113°40′28.49″E

Location in Western Australia

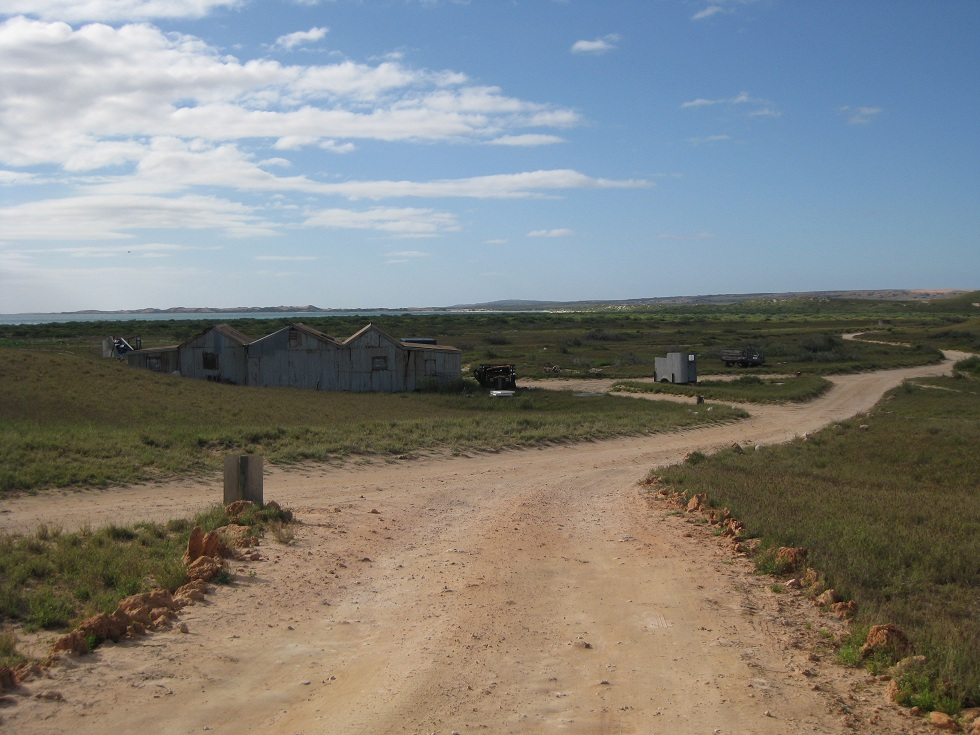
View from homestead

Ningaloo Station is a sheep station located in the Gascoyne region of Western Australia about 40 km (25 mi) north of Coral Bay. It is bordered to the north by Cape Range National Park.

The station has an area of approximately 50,000 ha (123,553 acres) and offers accommodation to travellers to the area in the form of camp-sites. The station is located adjacent to Ningaloo Reef, as are Cape Range National Park to the north and Gnaraloo Station and Warroora Station to the south.

Operating since at least 1919, the station produced at least 33 bales of wool in that year. The station was operated as a partnership between Herbert William Cope, Douglas Black and Leslie Leon Grant Black.

Receiving good falls of rain, 16.5 in (419 mm) by June, in 1923 the land contained excellent feed and lambing was heavy. A new machine shearing shed and quarters were constructed using materials from the schooner Geraldton that were landed in May. Fire broke out at the station early in November but was quickly brought under control with only minimal damage occurring. Later that year over 9,000 sheep were shorn and 215 bales of wool were produced by a shearing team of seven men over the course of three weeks; this was a record clip for the station. The wool was collected by Geraldton and shipped to Perth.

Over 1,200 sheep were removed from the station in 1924 and droved overland by Mr Cope to the port at Carnarvon over a period of 25 days. Although water was only available every second day only a dozen sheep were lost and the flock reached the port in excellent condition. Later the same year 10,100 sheep were shorn at the station, yielding 175 bales of wool; 3,000 lambs were also shorn, yielding an additional 30 bales.

Cope dissolved the partnership with the Blacks when he decided to retire in June 1924; the Blacks then took over sole ownership of the property.

The station had good falls of rain in 1927 and the country was reported as looking the best for five years, with good feed available. In all 9 in (229 mm) of rain fell between March and July, but shearing was expected to be poor with only 1000 lambs around due to the poor conditions from the previous years.

3,490 sheep were sold off from the station at the Midland Junction sale yards in 1929.

The Blacks sold the station in June 1937 to F. Lefroy and M. McBolt, who took possession of the property immediately.

Ningaloo and other nearby stations, including Wooramel Station, suffered from extensive damage from flooding following the passing of the remnants of a cyclone over the area in 1945.

The area received heavy rains in 1953 with Ningaloo being deluged with 303 points of rain overnight. Surrounding stations received falls of up to 3 in (76 mm).

In 2008 there was a rally of over 300 people to protest against the Department of Environment and Conservation move to take over the management of camping along the station's pristine coastline. The Lefroy family, who have held the lease on the station for over 70 years, were shocked at only being given five days to hand over management of its camp-sites. The state government also plans to extend its removal of the station coastline by 22 km (14 mi), covering an area of 22,000 ha (54,363 acres).

== See also ==
- List of pastoral leases in Western Australia
