= Burnabbie =

Former pastoral lease in Western Australia

Coordinates: 32.13127°S 126.29931°E

Location in Western Australia

Burnabbie or Burnabbie Station is a defunct pastoral lease that once operated as a sheep station. It is located about 50 kilometres (31 mi) southwest of Cocklebiddy and 430 kilometres (267 mi) east of Norseman in the Goldfields of Western Australia.

The station has existed since before 1941. The owners in that year were brothers H.E. and A.J. Carlisle, who disposed of their stock and enlisted in the army.

The ruins of the old homestead are located along the road from the highway to the Eyre Bird Observatory in the Nuytsland Nature Reserve.

== See also ==
- List of ranches and stations
