= Pippingarra =

Pastoral lease in Western Australia

Coordinates: 20.462°S 118.775°E

Location in Western Australia

Pippingarra Station is a pastoral lease that once operated as a sheep station and now operates as a cattle station, located 25 kilometres (16 mi) south east of Port Hedland and 125 kilometres (78 mi) north west of Marble Bar in the Pilbara region of Western Australia.

The station formed as a pastoral company in 1901 and for decades had one of the largest herds of sheep in the Pilbara.

The name of the station is taken from a well located within the area that was used as a resting place for travellers and stock.

In 1904 the station was owned by T. Richardson.

The lease for the property is currently held by the Western Australian Aboriginal Lands Trust and operated by the traditional owner groups of the area, the Ngarla, Njamal and Karriyarra.

== See also ==
- List of ranches and stations
- List of pastoral leases in Western Australia
