= Bulga Downs Station =

Pastoral lease in Western Australia

Location in Western Australia

Bulga Downs Station is a pastoral lease that once operated as a sheep station but is now a cattle station located in the Mid West region of Western Australia.

It is situated approximately 113 kilometres (70 mi) to the south west of Leinster and 192 kilometres (119 mi) south east of Mount Magnet.

Bulga Downs consists primarily of sand-plain country with outcrops of granite and ironstone. It receives an annual average rainfall of 225 millimetres (9 in). The trees and shrubs found in the area include mulga, sugar-brother, bowgada, mallee gums, saltbush and bluebush. Prominent grasses include broadleaf and narrowleaf wanderrie, kerosene grass, wind grass and white top granite grass.

The property was owned in 1921 by W. Baumberger, who sold it in 1923 to Messrs. Morrison and Calder. The 300,000-acre (121,406 ha) station was only partially improved at the time and was only carrying 1,500 sheep and some cattle. It was also experiencing problems with wild dogs attacking the stock.

In 1925 a total of 23,238 sheep were shorn at Bulga Downs. By 1928 the size of the flock had dropped to 4,879.

The McQuie family acquired the 2,870-square-kilometre (1,108 sq mi) property in 1984 and converted the station from grazing sheep to Angus cattle during the 1990s due to dingo problems. The last shearing was conducted in 2000 or 2001. J McQuie 2021.

== Geography ==
=== Climate ===
Bulga Downs has a subtropical desert climate (Köppen: BWh) with very hot summers, mild winters and low precipitation year-round. Extreme temperatures ranged from 48.0 °C (118.4 °F) on 21 January 2015 to −4.0 °C (24.8 °F) on 5 July 2017. The wettest recorded day was 27 February 1995 with 161.4 mm (6.35 in) of rainfall.

Climate data for Bulga Downs (28.50°S 119.74°E) (439 m (1,440 ft) AMSL) (1924-2025)
Month	Jan	Feb	Mar	Apr	May	Jun	Jul	Aug	Sep	Oct	Nov	Dec	Year
Record high °C (°F)	48.0 (118.4)	47.3 (117.1)	44.5 (112.1)	39.6 (103.3)	35.1 (95.2)	28.9 (84.0)	29.0 (84.2)	34.3 (93.7)	38.6 (101.5)	41.2 (106.2)	45.2 (113.4)	45.5 (113.9)	48.0 (118.4)
Mean daily maximum °C (°F)	38.1 (100.6)	37.0 (98.6)	33.0 (91.4)	28.7 (83.7)	24.1 (75.4)	19.9 (67.8)	19.4 (66.9)	22.3 (72.1)	25.7 (78.3)	30.3 (86.5)	33.2 (91.8)	36.5 (97.7)	29.0 (84.2)
Mean daily minimum °C (°F)	22.5 (72.5)	21.8 (71.2)	18.8 (65.8)	14.2 (57.6)	9.1 (48.4)	6.3 (43.3)	4.8 (40.6)	6.4 (43.5)	9.3 (48.7)	13.8 (56.8)	17.4 (63.3)	20.5 (68.9)	13.7 (56.7)
Record low °C (°F)	11.3 (52.3)	12.7 (54.9)	10.2 (50.4)	4.9 (40.8)	−0.4 (31.3)	−3.5 (25.7)	−4.0 (24.8)	−2.8 (27.0)	1.1 (34.0)	2.6 (36.7)	5.8 (42.4)	11.5 (52.7)	−4.0 (24.8)
Average precipitation mm (inches)	29.6 (1.17)	29.7 (1.17)	26.8 (1.06)	20.1 (0.79)	24.0 (0.94)	26.7 (1.05)	22.9 (0.90)	15.3 (0.60)	7.7 (0.30)	8.3 (0.33)	11.7 (0.46)	12.7 (0.50)	235.3 (9.26)
Average precipitation days (≥ 0.2 mm)	2.6	2.8	3.1	2.7	2.7	5.1	4.7	3.7	1.7	1.4	1.8	2.1	34.4
Source: Bureau of Meteorology (1924-2025)

== See also ==
- List of ranches and stations
- List of pastoral leases in Western Australia
