= Bow River Station =

Pastoral lease in Western Australia

Coordinates: 16.8717°S 128.2167°E

Location in Western Australia

Bow River Station is a pastoral lease that operates as a cattle station in Western Australia.

It is located approximately 20 kilometres (12 mi) north west of Warmun and 135 km (84 mi) south of Kununurra on the Bow River in the Kimberley region of Western Australia.

Gold was found in the area in 1885, with squatters occupying grazing lands in 1888.

The song "Bow River" on the 1982 album Circus Animals by Australian band Cold Chisel is named for the station. The brother of songwriter and performer, Ian Moss, had once worked there.

== See also ==
- List of ranches and stations
- List of pastoral leases in Western Australia
