= Balline Station =

Pastoral lease in Western Australia

Coordinates: 28.60585°S 114.1952°E

Location in Western Australia

Balline Station is a pastoral lease that operates as a sheep station in Western Australia.

It is located approximately 40 kilometres (25 mi) north-west of Northampton and 40 km (25 mi) south of Kalbarri in the Mid West region of Western Australia. The property has coastal frontage and is found between Lynton Station and the mouth of the Murchison River. The shearing shed is largely built from spars and planks washed ashore at nearby Lucky Bay.

John Thomas acquired the property some time prior to his death in 1895. He was among the first squatters in the area.

The property and surrounding area were shaken by an earthquake in 1909. Later the same year, a bushman named Palmer was taken to Geraldton Hospital and placed in isolation with a suspected case of bubonic plague, from which he later died.

Bushfires swept through the area in 1913, leaving little feed for stock.

The 40,000-acre (16,187 ha) property stocked with 3,000 sheep was put up for auction by C. H. Counsel in 1924 and sold for £10,000.

The Forrester family owned the property in 1930 when they built the heritage-listed residence, known as Stone House, in the town of Northampton. They remained at Balline until at least 1943. By 1945 the Hose brothers had acquired the property.

In 2004 the lease was held by R.J. & H.M. Hose and Sons.

== See also ==
- List of ranches and stations
- List of pastoral leases in Western Australia
