= Mount Keith Station =

Pastoral lease in Western Australia

Coordinates: 27°16′36″S 120°30′20″E

Location in Western Australia

Mount Keith Station is a pastoral lease in Western Australia.

It is located approximately 72 kilometres (45 mi) north of Leinster and 81 km (50 mi) south of Wiluna.

The station is named after nearby Mount Keith, which was named after Algernon Keith-Falconer, 9th Earl of Kintore by the explorer David Lindsay during the 1891 Elder expedition though the area. Mining leases became available in the area in 1895 following an expansion in the Murchison goldfields.

In 1928 the property occupied an area of 220,000 acres (89,031 ha) and was owned by a syndicate whose principal figure was H. E. Vail, who also owned the Wiluna gold mine.

The 233,000-acre (94,292 ha) property stocked with 4,400 sheep was sold by Robert Oldham in 1950 to John Jones of Boogardie Station.

== See also ==
- List of ranches and stations
- List of pastoral leases in Western Australia
