= Barwidgee Station =

Pastoral lease in Western Australia

Coordinates: 27.0347°S 120.9233°E

Location in Western Australia

Barwidgee Station is a pastoral lease that operates as a sheep station in Western Australia.

It is located approximately 85 kilometres (53 mi) south east of Wiluna and 92 km (57 mi) north east of Leinster in the Mid West region of Western Australia.

The Ryan brothers sold the property in 1944 to L. Bilston, who had managed the station for the previous five years. At this time the station occupied an area of 700,000 acres (2,833 km^{2}) and was completely fenced and divided into paddocks. There were sixty mills connected to tanks, a five-stand shearing shed, two wool sheds and a compact homestead. It was stocked with 7,000 sheep, 100 cattle and 30 horses.

In 1950 the property was stocked with 9,500 sheep.

Mega Uranium acquired the 2,760-square-kilometre (1,066 sq mi) lease in 2009. Mega's Lake Maitland uranium mine is located on the lease.

== See also ==
- List of ranches and stations
- List of pastoral leases in Western Australia
