= Carlindi Station =

Pastoral lease in Western Australia

Coordinates: 20.6462°S 119.2509°E

Location in Western Australia

Carlindi Station (also sometimes spelled as Carlindie Station) is a pastoral lease that was once a sheep station but now operates as a cattle station in Western Australia.

It is located approximately 75 kilometres (47 mi) south east of Port Hedland and 79 km (49 mi) north west of Marble Bar on the East Strelley River in the Pilbara region of Western Australia. The lease shares a boundary with Shaw Station.

The property was established at some time prior to 1907 and was regarded as one of the smaller leases in the area. It was producing wool for export in 1908, and was stocked with a flock of 5,300 sheep in 1912.

In 1913 the lease was held by Archie McGregor and Percy Charles Riches. The station occupied an area of 170,000 acres (68,797 ha) and was not yet completely fenced. The flock was 10,000 sheep but it was estimated that the area could support 17,000. The owners were also breeding donkeys and mules which they thought would be useful for general station work and well repairing work.

McGregor collapsed and died suddenly in 1919, followed by Riches four months later. Thomas Molloy later became the station manager and remained for many years before moving to De Grey Station.

Currently Carlindi is part of the Strelley group, at the centre of a group of stations leased by the Nomads Charitable Foundation for the Aboriginal people of the area. Carlindi occupies an area of 65,000 hectares (160,618 acres); other properties in the group include Callawa Station, Strelley and Lalla Rookh Station.

== See also ==
- List of ranches and stations
- List of pastoral leases in Western Australia
