= Mount Minnie Station =

Pastoral lease in Western Australia

Coordinates: 21.9732°S 115.4336°E

Location in Western Australia

Mount Minnie Station, often referred to as Mount Minnie, is a pastoral lease that once operated as a sheep station but now operates as a cattle station.

It is located about 50 kilometres (31 mi) south east of Onslow and 135 kilometres (84 mi) east of Exmouth in the Pilbara region of Western Australia.

The property was pioneered by Kenneth Durwent Messer. It was once part of the Gifford Creek lease, which was owned by Septimus Burt. The station takes its name from the nearby Minnie Creek. In 1913 a stone homestead was built on the property.

== See also ==
- List of ranches and stations
- List of pastoral leases in Western Australia
