= Boodanoo Station =

Pastoral lease in Western Australia

Coordinates: 28.7272°S 118.2676°E

Location in Western Australia

Boodanoo Station is a pastoral lease that was once a sheep station but now operates as a cattle station in Western Australia.

It is located approximately 85 kilometres (53 mi) south east of Mount Magnet and 115 km (71 mi) south of Cue in the Mid West region of Western Australia.

It was established some time prior to 1908; the owner in 1909 was S.R.L Elliot, who had been there for the last 12 months. Elliot sold the 300,000-acre (120,000 ha) holding to R. Lejeune and Vernon Sewell, who owned Sandsprings Station. The pair intended to stock the property immediately. In 1910 Boodanoo was stocked with approximately 4,000 sheep. By 1916 the flock was 5,500 sheep and 6,000 in 1919.

Lejeune was accidentally shot and killed by a kangaroo shooter in 1931. The shooter had shot a kangaroo but the bullet passed through the animal and travelled an additional 0.5 miles (0.8 km) through the mulga scrub before hitting Lejeune.

In 1946 the lease was split into Boodanoo North and Boodanoo South, with both properties being placed on the market. Boodanoo North comprised 172,000 acres (70,000 ha) with 150,000 acres (61,000 ha) fenced into 10 paddocks. The property had 15 windmills and an 8-roomed homestead. Boodanoo North comprised 210,000 acres (85,000 ha) with 200,000 acres (81,000 ha) fenced into 12 paddocks.

Julie and Robert Broadhurst purchased Boodanoo and Narndee Stations in 2015. The properties occupy a combined area of 560,000 acres (226,624 ha) and operate as both a cattle station and a tourist destination.

== See also ==
- List of ranches and stations
- List of pastoral leases in Western Australia
