= Binthalya Station =

Pastoral lease in Western Australia

Coordinates: 24.688°S 114.837°E

Location in Western Australia

Binthalya Station is a defunct pastoral lease that once operated as a sheep station in Western Australia.

It was located 121 kilometres (75 mi) east of Carnarvon and 203 kilometres (126 mi) south east of Coral Bay in the Gascoyne region. Situated at the foot of the Kennedy Range the property was well watered by numerous springs. The property was once described as consisting of soft and oathead spinifex flats with plenty of saltbush.

Binthalya is an Aboriginal word – the word thalya means hole there – and takes its name from a nearby well. The homestead was built by Andrew Dempster.

In 1906 the property was owned by George Baston and occupied an area of 260,000 acres (105,218 ha) and was stocked with 2,500 sheep. H. Gerald Lefroy acquired a stake in the property in 1908, providing capital to further improve the holding. Lefroy placed Binthalya on the market in 1909. At this stage the property comprised 210,000 acres (84,984 ha) and was stocked with 6,000 sheep and 45 cattle. It was divided into three sheep paddocks and one horse paddock, and had seven wells, two of which had windmills. It was eventually acquired by the Dempster brothers in 1914; the Dempsters recruited H. E. Bates to manage the property for them. W. E. Dempster sold the property along with the 9,000 sheep it was stocked with to A. W. Walker and Co. in 1923.

The lease for the property was surrendered in 1977 with parts of the lease taken up by the neighbouring properties, Mooka and Mardathuna Stations.

In 2013 the area once covered by Binthalya was being managed by the Department of Environment and Conservation.

== See also ==
- List of pastoral leases in Western Australia
