= Bandya Station =

Pastoral lease in Western Australia

Coordinates: 27.697°S 122.134°E

Location in Western Australia

Bandya Station, often referred to as Bandya, is a pastoral lease that operates as a sheep station.

It is located about 110 kilometres (68 mi) north of Laverton and 144 kilometres (89 mi) north west of Leinster in the Goldfields-Esperance region of Western Australia.

Established in the early 1900s, the property was initially known as Salt Soak Station. An early part owner was J. MacCalmont, who also owned Laverton Downs Station.

In 1927, W. C. Hill was the owner of the property.

In 1928 Bandya occupied an area of over 700,000 acres (2,833 km^{2}) and was owned by W. C. Hill. It was stocked with 2,000 cattle and 3,000 sheep.

In the 1980s the property was running an average flock size of 15,000 sheep. The Hill family, who also owned Mount Weld Station located to the north of Bandya, were experiencing difficulties with feral dogs attacking stock on the property.

== See also ==
- List of ranches and stations
