= Yakabindie =

Pastoral lease in Western Australia

Coordinates: 27°34′32″S 120°31′54″E

Location in Western Australia

Yakabindie is a pastoral lease, currently a cattle station and previously a sheep station, located about 31 kilometres (19 mi) north west of Leinster and 114 kilometres (71 mi) south of Wiluna in the Goldfields region of Western Australia.

The station was placed on the market in 1920, and existed as 13 separate leases that encircled Sir Samuel and encompassed an area of 447,000 acres (180,894 ha). 360 cattle, 200 horses and 75 camels were being run on the property, and they were kept watered by 10 wells fitted with windmills. About 38 miles (61 km) of fencing was in place, most around one big paddock but one smaller sheep paddock had its own 5-mile (8 km) fence.

The homestead was situated in Sir Samuel and had four large rooms, vestibule, kitchen, and bathroom constructed of wood and iron. The building was lined with stamped steel. The grazing land was described as typical Murchison country with plenty of mulga, saltbush and edible bushes suited for cattle.

The climate is semi-arid but prone to the occasional deluge of rain; in December 1928 a fall of 5 inches (127 mm) was recorded, and in January 1931, 2 inches (51 mm) were recorded in a day and 6 inches (152 mm) over the course of a week in January 1939 to break the drought.

The station occupied an area of 470,000 acres (190,202 ha) in 1923 when it was part owned by Mr. R. H. Adamson. When Adamson and partners acquired the station in 1920 it was running cattle but they introduced sheep in 1923 when they bought 2,000 ewes.

For the first clip in 1924, 3,300 sheep were shorn and with an estimated 500 stragglers to be mustered. About 7.3 pounds (3 kg) of wool per sheep was obtained.

The station was still owned by Adamson in 1953 when he succeeded Sir Langlois Lefroy as President of the Pastoralists' Association of Western Australia.

Presently owned by BHP subsidiary Nickel West, Yakabindie is one of six leases operated by it. The area of the station is now 250,000 hectares (617,763 acres) and runs approximately 1,200 droughtmaster cattle.

== See also ==
- List of ranches and stations
