= Beebyn Station =

Pastoral lease in Western Australia

Coordinates: 26.9073°S 117.8928°E

Location in Western Australia

Beebyn Station is a pastoral lease that operates as a sheep station in Western Australia.

It is located approximately 50 kilometres (31 mi) north of Cue and 72 km (45 mi) south west of Meekatharra in the Mid West region of Western Australia.

In 2015 the lease was owned by Viper Holdings Pty. Ltd.

== See also ==
- List of ranches and stations
- List of pastoral leases in Western Australia
