= List of homesteads in Western Australia =

This list includes all homesteads in Western Australia with a gazetted name.

== Currency ==
This list is complete with respect to the 1996 Gazetteer of Australia. Dubious names have been checked against the online 2004 data, and in all cases confirmed correct. However, if any homesteads have been gazetted or deleted since 1996, this list does not reflect these changes. Strictly speaking, Australian place names are gazetted in capital letters only; the names in this list have been converted to mixed case in accordance with normal capitalisation conventions.

== Conditions ==
Homesteads do not necessarily equate to current legally constituted pastoral leases as identified by Landgate – some might correlate to stations of the same name, but cannot be taken as specific identifiers of lands considered to be pastoral leases or stations.

Considerable numbers of homesteads – although identified and located by co-ordinates are not necessarily viable residences or locations – on maps of Australia, many homesteads are identified as either "ruins" or "abandoned homesteads".

== See also ==
- List of pastoral leases in Western Australia
