= Kinclaven Station =

Pastoral lease in Western Australia

Coordinates: 30.866°S 125.521°E

Location in Western Australia

Kinclaven Station, often referred to as Kinclaven, is a pastoral lease that operates as a cattle station.

It is located about 370 kilometres (230 mi) east of Kambalda and 385 kilometres (239 mi) north east of Norseman on the western edge of the Nullarbor plain in the Goldfields-Esperance region of Western Australia.

Kinclaven occupies an area of 4,967 square kilometres (1,918 sq mi) and is mostly composed of deflated limestone plains with regular karst depressions surrounded by bindii grasslands along with areas of calcrete plains covered with myall woodlands and mixed shrubland. The property is able to carry a flock of 33,250 sheep.

The station is an amalgamation of several leases including Seemore Downs and Premier Downs. The area was first used for pastoral pursuits in the early 1900s by J. D. Ryan, who ran stock to supply meat to the workers on the Trans-Australian Railway line, which passed through the holding. In the 1920s the lease was acquired by the Dimer brothers, who also owned Nanambinnia. By the 1930s the Dimers had sunk more wells in the area and installed windmills, the built cattle yards and constructed a small cottage on the property. The Dimers continued to acquire surrounding leases through the 1930s, and in 1936 the homestead building was taken from the Eyre repeater station and was moved to the Seemore Downs lease and rebuilt. The building had originally been built in 1877.

By the 1960s leases in the area were reallocated comprising much larger and more viable areas. M. H. Kittle took up Seemore Downs and Premier Downs and established an outcamp at Endeavour bore. He also employed a station manager and changed the herd to shorthorn cattle. In 1971 the Hogg family acquired the leases for 1,619 square kilometres (625 sq mi) between Seemore Downs and Gunnadorah and named it Kinclaven after the Scottish village where he had been born. By 1978, after four years of below average rainfall, the property was carrying 700 head of cattle. In 1982 the Hoggs acquired the leases of Seemore Downs and Premier Downs then further leases were added to the station in 1987.

== See also ==
- List of ranches and stations
