= Badja Station =

Pastoral lease in Western Australia

Coordinates: 28.601°S 116.778°E

Location in Western Australia

Badja Station is a pastoral lease that operates as a sheep station in Western Australia.

It is located approximately 121 kilometres (75 mi) south west of Mount Magnet and 101 kilometres (63 mi) north east of Morawa in the Mid West region of Western Australia.

The station was established at some time prior to 1897. In 1897 Badja was operating as a cattle station. The lessee, John Morrissey, died and approximately 1,400 cattle were put up for sale.

Edward Wittenoom owned both Badja and nearby Hinton Station in 1909, both of which were being operated as sheep stations.

Gindalbie Metals, an iron ore miner, proposed to turn part of its operations at Badja into a national radioactive waste management facility in 2015. Badja was destocked at the time and occupied an area of 1,336 square kilometres (516 sq mi). The station was the subject of a native title claim by Aboriginal Australians, the Widi people, at the time.

== See also ==
- List of ranches and stations
- List of pastoral leases in Western Australia
