= Wallal =

Bore in the Kimberley region of Western Australia

Coordinates: 19°46′45.62″S 120°38′29.33″E

Location in Western Australia

Wallal is the location of a bore in the Kimberley region of Western Australia. The bore is located 5 kilometres (3 mi) from the Great Northern Highway between Port Hedland and Broome and has an elevation of 10 metres (33 ft). The nearest town is Marble Bar, 140 kilometres (87 mi) south of the bore.

The bore falls within the boundaries of Wallal Downs Station, a historical pastoral lease, that operates in the area. The station also has a caravan park situated in close proximity to the bore and Eighty Mile Beach. The airstrip, located nearby, is no longer maintained to a useable degree, the nearest alternative being the strip at Sandfire Roadhouse.

The station is the most southerly cattle station in the Kimberley. With a size of approximately 660,000 acres (300,000 ha), the Wallal Downs property stretches from the coastal flats into the Great Sandy Desert. The property is owned by Warrawagine Cattle Co, and ran jointly with Warrawagine Station. Wallal Downs operates as a finishing block for Droughtmaster males bred at Warrawagine. Utilising the marine buffel plains and 12 centre pivots producing rhodes grass hay and silage, as well as functioning as grazing sites, animals perform exceptionally well on the property, recording consistently high average daily gains. Once at sale weights, these animals are regularly sold into both the domestic markets to the south and to the live export markets to the north, with the yards and infrastructure at Wallal downs facilitating all year round trucking access.

Wallal is also of historical interest as the location of an international effort to observe the solar eclipse on 21 September 1922, to validate Einstein's theory of relativity.

== See also ==
- List of ranches and stations
- The Eclipse at Wallal, Western Australia, 1922
