= Muccan Station =

Pastoral lease in Western Australia

Coordinates: 20°38′21″S 120°03′06″E

Location in Western Australia

Muccan or Muccan Station is a pastoral lease and cattle station that once operated as a sheep station, located approximately 68 kilometres (42 mi) north east of Marble Bar and 155 kilometres (96 mi) south east of Port Hedland in the Pilbara region of Western Australia. Kookenyia Creek and the De Grey River run through the property. The country is gently undulating with large areas of spinifex.

The lease was initially taken up by Messrs. Grant, Anderson and Edgar, who appointed Christopher Coppin as manager to pioneer the property in 1879. After seven years at Muccan Coppin left and took up the neighbouring lease and founded Yarrie Station.

Some time later the Darlot brothers acquired the 387,000-acre (156,613 ha) property, which they exchanged with Ball and Corbett for the Warrawagine country that the pair held.

By 1897 the property was owned by the Ball brothers and Michael Corbett with at least 5,000 sheep being run at the station. The partnership was dissolved in 1900, leaving Corbett and one of the Ball brothers in charge. By 1906 approximately 17,000 sheep were shorn at Muccan. followed by 13,005 in 1908.

In 1912 Corbett was the sole proprietor at Muccan. Later the same year 19,000 sheep were shorn producing 330 bales of wool.

Corbett was in a partnership with Charles Holthouse in 1913 when the property occupied an area of 200,000 acres (80,937 ha) and was stocked with approximately 20,000 sheep. In 1914 about 18,000 sheep produced 300 bales.

Corbett died in 1923, and Holthouse became the sole owner of Muccan. Holthouse died in 1945 leaving the property to his wife and family.

Muccan was run in conjunction with Yarrie Station from 1990 by the Coppin family to 2015. In 2015 Muccan was purchased by Mahony and Coppin Pastoral which owns and manages the property.

== See also ==
- List of pastoral leases in Western Australia
