= Laverton Downs =

Pastoral lease in Western Australia

Coordinates: 28.461°S 122.43°E

Location in Western Australia

Laverton Downs Station is a pastoral lease that has operated as both a cattle station and a sheep station in Western Australia.

It is situated approximately 20 kilometres (12 mi) to the north of Laverton and 181 kilometres (112 mi) east of Leinster in the Goldfields-Esperance region. The area supports stands of saltbush and other herbage with grassy plains.

In 1925 the property was stocked with 600 head of cattle and occupied an area of 250,000 acres (101,171 ha) and had been put on the market along with nearby Mount Crawford Station. The owner, J. MacCalmont, had vastly improved the property and was running 3,000 head of cattle. It was acquired a pair of Queenslanders, Messrs Allen and Rennie. By 1928 sheep were being run at Laverton Downs with a flock of 5,500 grazing the land. Some 9,000 sheep were shorn during shearing in 1930.

George William Anderson owned the property before 1940 and was still running it in 1948.

== See also ==
- List of ranches and stations
- List of pastoral leases in Western Australia
