= Shire of Upper Gascoyne =

Coordinates: 25°03′07″S 115°12′32″E

- Local government area
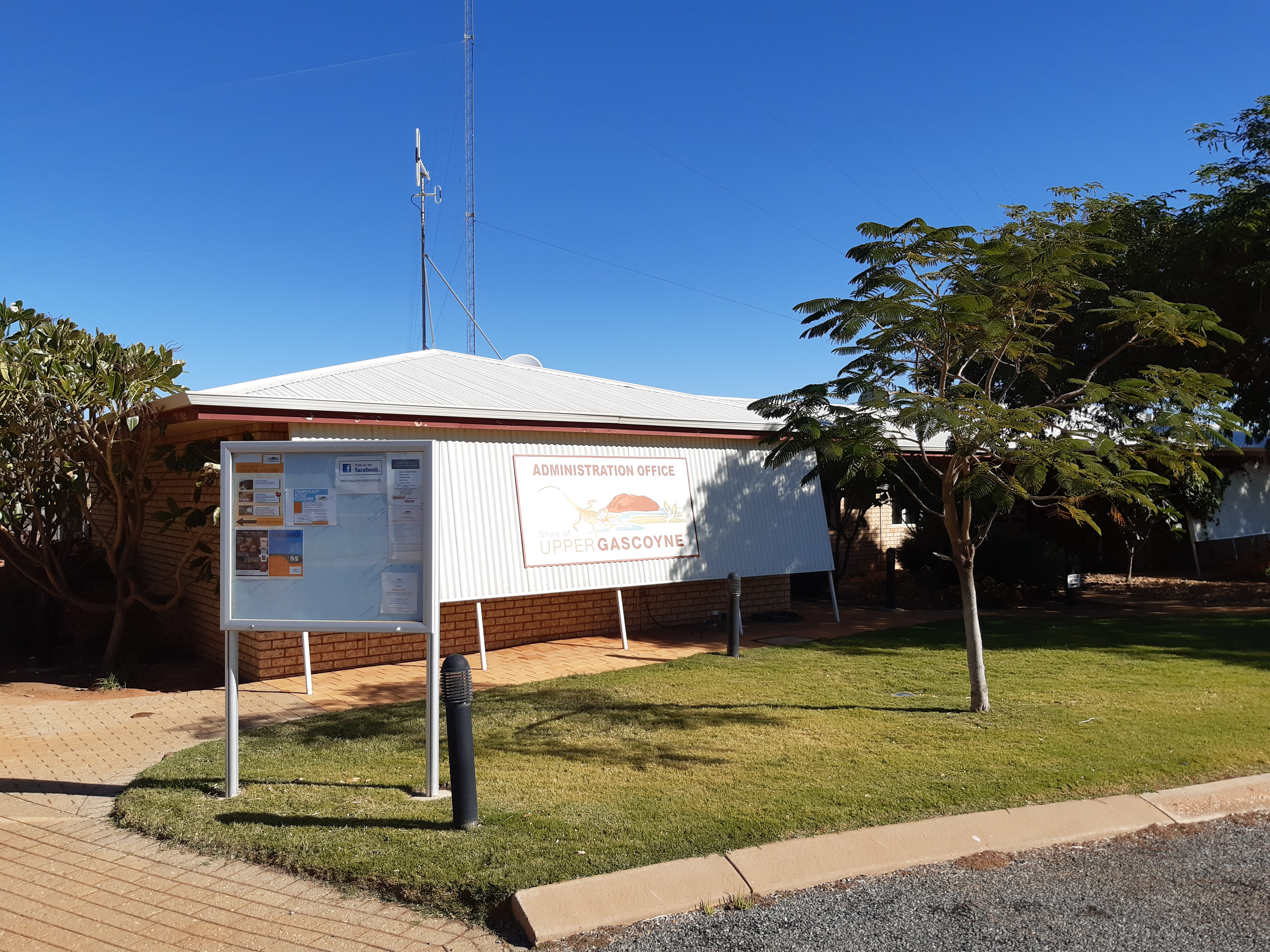
- The Shire of Upper Gascoyne administration office

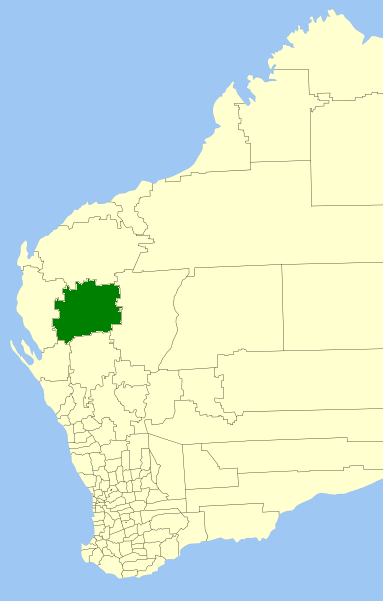
- Location in Western Australia
- Country: Australia
- State: Western Australia
- Region: Gascoyne region
- Established: 1887
- Council seat: Gascoyne Junction

Government
  - Shire President: Don Hammmarquist
  - State electorate: North West
  - Federal division: Durack

Area
  - Total: 57,939 km^{2} (22,370 sq mi)

Population
  - Total: 170 (LGA 2021)
- Website: Shire of Upper Gascoyne
LGAs around Shire of Upper Gascoyne
Ashburton	Ashburton	Meekatharra
Carnarvon	Shire of Upper Gascoyne	Meekatharra
Shark Bay	Murchison	Meekatharra

The Shire of Upper Gascoyne is a local government area in the Gascoyne region of Western Australia, inland from Carnarvon and about 1,000 kilometres (620 mi) north of the state capital, Perth. The Shire has an area of 57,939 square kilometres (22,370 sq mi), much of which is uninhabited land or sparsely vegetated sheep station country, and its seat of government is the small town of Gascoyne Junction. It has a population of 170 (2021 census), 56% of whom identify as Aboriginal.

== History ==
The Upper Gascoyne Road District was gazetted on 10 February 1887. On 1 July 1961, it became a Shire under the Local Government Act 1960, which reformed all remaining road districts into shires. The original Road Board office is now a heritage-listed site.

== Wards ==
The shire is divided into 3 wards, each with two councillors:

- North Ward
- South Ward
- East Ward

== Towns and localities ==
The towns and localities of the Shire of Upper Gascoyne with population and size figures based on the most recent Australian census:

Suburb	Population	Area	Map
East Lyons River	13 (SAL 2021)	11,014.3 km^{2} (4,252.6 sq mi)	
Gascoyne Junction	65 (SAL 2021)	21.1 km^{2} (8.1 sq mi)	
Gascoyne River	87 (SAL 2021)	26,744.9 km^{2} (10,326.3 sq mi)	
West Lyons River	0 (SAL 2021)	20,042.8 km^{2} (7,738.6 sq mi)	

== Notable councillors ==
- Everard Darlot, Upper Gascoyne Road Board member 1887; later a state MP
- Lionel Kelly, Upper Gascoyne Road Board member 1927–1928; later a state MP

== Heritage-listed places ==
As of 2024, 19 places are heritage-listed in the Shire of Upper Gascoyne, of which one is on the State Register of Heritage Places, the Upper Gascoyne Road Board Office in Gascoyne Junction.
