= Shire of Shark Bay =

Coordinates: 25°55′37″S 113°32′02″E

- Local government area
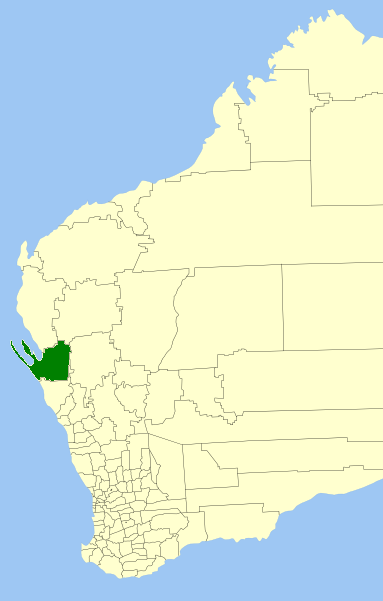
- Location in Western Australia

- Country: Australia
- State: Western Australia
- Region: Gascoyne
- Established: 1904
- Council seat: Denham

Government
  - Shire President: Cheryl Cowell
  - State electorate: Mid-West
  - Federal division: Durack

Area
  - Total: 25,423 km^{2} (9,816 sq mi)

Population
  - Total: 1,031 (LGA 2021)
- Website: Shire of Shark Bay
LGAs around Shire of Shark Bay
Indian Ocean	Carnarvon	Upper Gascoyne
Indian Ocean	Shire of Shark Bay	Murchison
Indian Ocean	Northampton	Northampton

The Shire of Shark Bay is a local government area of Western Australia in the Gascoyne region. It has an area of 25,423 square kilometres (9,816 sq mi) and a population of about 950. It is made up of two peninsulas and Shark Bay, located at the westernmost point of Australia. There is one town in the Shire of Shark Bay, Denham, which is the administrative centre for the Shire. There are also a number of small communities; they are Useless Loop (a now-closed mining site), Monkey Mia (a popular resort where dolphins come in), Nanga and Hamelin Pool. The Overlander and The Billabong are roadhouses.

== History ==
The Shark Bay Road District was gazetted on 13 May 1904. In 1951 the then current officials were dismissed. On 1 July 1961, it became a shire under the Local Government Act 1960, which reformed all remaining road districts into shires.

== Wards ==
The Shire is divided into three wards:

- Denham Ward (five councillors)
- Pastoral Ward (one councillor)
- Useless Loop Ward (one councillor)

== Towns and localities ==
The towns and localities of the Shire of Shark Bay with population and size figures based on the most recent Australian census:

Suburb	Population	Area	Map
Carbla	0 (SAL 2016)	952.6 km^{2} (367.8 sq mi)	
Carrarang		807.4 km^{2} (311.7 sq mi)	
Coburn	0 (SAL 2016)	1,004.7 km^{2} (387.9 sq mi)	
Denham	849 (SAL 2021)	53.2 km^{2} (20.5 sq mi)	
Dirk Hartog Island	9 (SAL 2021)	630.4 km^{2} (243.4 sq mi)	
Francois Peron National Park ^{[2]}	^{[1]}	1,084 km^{2} (419 sq mi)	
Gilroyd	0 (SAL 2016)	809.8 km^{2} (312.7 sq mi)	
Hamelin Pool	23 (SAL 2021)	2,054.7 km^{2} (793.3 sq mi)	
Meadow	3 (SAL 2021)	833.9 km^{2} (322.0 sq mi)	
Nanga	4 (SAL 2021)	1,786.8 km^{2} (689.9 sq mi)	
Nerren Nerren	6 (SAL 2021)	2,336.9 km^{2} (902.3 sq mi)	
Shark Bay	0 (SAL 2016)	8,202.4 km^{2} (3,167.0 sq mi)	
Talisker	0 (SAL 2021)	2,875.3 km^{2} (1,110.2 sq mi)	
Tamala	5 (SAL 2021)	1,386.4 km^{2} (535.3 sq mi)	
Toolonga	0 (SAL 2016)	4,142.5 km^{2} (1,599.4 sq mi)	
Woodleigh	0 (SAL 2021)	2,327.9 km^{2} (898.8 sq mi)	
Yalardy	0 (SAL 2016)	1,011.9 km^{2} (390.7 sq mi)	

- ^[1] For the purpose of the 2021 Australian census, Francois Peron National Park was counted as part of Denham.
- ^[2] Boundaries of national park and locality are not identical

== Economy ==
Major employers include the salt works at Useless Loop along with the fishing industry and the various retail outlets meeting the needs of the tourist industry. There are some 30 personnel employed by the Department of Environment and Conservation and twenty by the Shire. There is a primary school and a Distance Education structured secondary school. Numbers of school aged children fluctuate around the 100 mark. The police station is staffed by 3 officers.

Local industries include tourism, fishing, salt, pearl marine culturing, mining of shell grit and various pastoral activities.

== Tourism ==
The creation of the Shark Bay World Heritage Site has created significant impact on the community within the shire area.

== Community ==
The Shire council produced a community newsletter titled the Inscription Post from 1989 until January 2011 when it was produced by the Shark Bay Community Resource Centre.

== Climate ==
The Shire of Shark Bay has a mild arid tropical climate, with mean daily maximum temperatures ranging from 22 °C (72 °F) in July to 32 °C (90 °F) in February. On 18 February 2024, Shark Bay recorded a temperature of 49.8 °C (121.6 °F). Rainfall is low and variable, with most rain falling in the winter months and a certain amount due to cyclone activity. The average annual rainfall is 228 millimetres (9.0 in).

== Population ==
Historical population

Year	Pop.	±% p.a.
1911	226	—
1921	231	+0.22%
1933	257	+0.89%
1947	183	−2.40%
1954	233	+3.51%
1961	387	+7.52%
1966	387	+0.00%
1971	687	+12.16%
1976	696	+0.26%

Year	Pop.	±% p.a.
1981	629	−2.00%
1986	1,081	+11.44%
1991	1,570	+7.75%
1996	1,840	+3.22%
2001	2,025	+1.93%
2006	1,841	−1.89%
2011	857	−14.18%
2016	946	+2.00%
2021	1,031	+1.74%

== Heritage-listed places ==
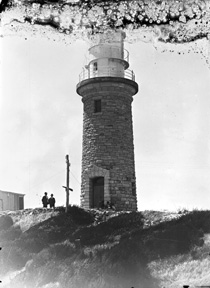
Cape Inscription lighthouse, Dirk Hartog Island, c.1910

As of 2024, 53 places are heritage-listed in the Shire of Shark Bay, of which three are on the State Register of Heritage Places, all on Dirk Hartog Island.
