= Wonganoo =

Pastoral lease in Western Australia

Coordinates: 27.139°S 121.338°E

Location in Western Australia

Wonganoo or Wonganoo Station is a pastoral lease that currently operates as a cattle station and had previously operated as a sheep station.

It is located about 106 kilometres (66 mi) north east of Leinster and 126 kilometres (78 mi) south east of Wiluna in the Mid West region of Western Australia.

The station occupies an area of 349,717 hectares (864,170 acres) and is currently carrying 3,000 head of cattle; it is rated to support a flock of 20,000 of sheep. It is watered by two permanent springs, numerous soaks and 64 bores. Other improvements include four-bedroom homestead, a two-bedroom cottage and five-bedroom workers quarters. The property has four sets of stockyards and an aircraft hangar. It was advertised for sale at A$2.5 million.

The Boladeras family acquired Wonganoo in 1925 with it being in partnership between the two Boladeras brothers.

Malcolm Boladeras commenced running the station in 1979 after taking over from his father. By 2000 large packs of feral dogs were attacking the sheep and reduced the flock size from 9,000 to 2,000 in one year. Boladeras hired a shooter in an attempt to control the dog population but by 2004 was making the change to cattle.

== See also ==
- List of ranches and stations
