= Lalla Rookh Station =

Pastoral lease in Western Australia

Coordinates: 20.8834°S 119.1405°E

Location in Western Australia

Lalla Rookh Station, often referred to as Lalla Rookh, is a pastoral lease that once operated as a sheep station but now operates as a cattle station.

It is located about 70 kilometres (43 mi) north west of Marble Bar and 85 kilometres (53 mi) south east of Port Hedland and in the Pilbara region of Western Australia.

The station was founded some time before 1903, and was owned by F. Thelemann in that year. Gold mines were operating in the area in 1916.

The 107,917-hectare (266,669-acre) station is currently one of the Strelley properties, five pastoral leases held by Indigenous Australian groups including the Strelley Pastoral Company. Other properties in the group are Carlindi, Strelley and Callawa Station.

== See also ==
- List of ranches and stations
