= Coongan Station =

Pastoral lease in Western Australia

Coordinates: 20.6864°S 119.6606°E

Location in Western Australia

Coongan Station is a pastoral lease that was once a sheep station but now operates as a cattle station in Western Australia.

It is approximately 55 kilometres (34 mi) north of Marble Bar and 117 km (73 mi) south-east of Port Hedland on the Coongan River in the Pilbara region of Western Australia.

The station was established at some time prior to 1896, when it was owned by a Mr. Hardey. The following year the station was owned by the Robinson brothers. The Robinsons, Percy and John, started with a flock of 2,000 sheep.

In 1910, the property supported a flock of 17,500 sheep, which produced 250 bales of wool.

Percy Robinson died in 1943 at the age of 77 years.

== See also ==
- List of pastoral leases in Western Australia
- List of ranches and stations
