= Yarrie Station =

Pastoral lease in Western Australia

Coordinates: 20°40′29″S 120°12′12″E

Location in Western Australia

Yarrie or Yarrie Station is a pastoral lease and cattle station that once operated as a sheep station, located approximately 73 kilometres (45 mi) north east of Marble Bar and 170 kilometres (106 mi) south east of Port Hedland in the Pilbara region of Western Australia. The De Grey River runs through the property.

The property currently occupies an area of 2,500 square kilometres (965 sq mi) and is stocked with 5,000 head of cattle. It was acquired by Annabelle Coppin in 2015; she had managed Yarrie for the previous five years, before purchasing the property from her parents. Yarrie has been held by the Coppin family for five generations.

The property was established in 1886 by Christopher Coppin, who had arrived in the area in 1873. He built the stone homestead that the family live in today. By 1897, the property was stocked with 8,000 sheep.

In 1914, the station was being run by Herbert Coppin and was stocked with approximately 15,000 sheep. The station had a good year, receiving 9 inches (229 mm) of rain in less than six months.

Muccan Station has been run in conjunction with Yarrie Station since about 1990 by the Coppin family.

In 2015, the station also commenced earthworks to hold annual rainwater runoff for longer to help rehydrate the rangelands in the De Grey River catchment area. Surrounding properties including Limestone, De Grey and Warrawagine Stations are also involved in the project.

== See also ==
- List of ranches and stations
