= Roy Hill Station =

Pastoral lease in Western Australia

Coordinates: 22°37′13″S 119°57′30″E

Location in Western Australia

Roy Hill Station is a pastoral lease and cattle station, located about 18 kilometres (11 mi) south of the Roy Hill mine.

Roy Hill Station was an important cattle station in the north-west, being on the Meekatharra-Nullagine Road and stock route. The station area is about 396,604 hectares (980,030 acres).

The station was established in 1886 by Nat Cooke, who owned Mallina Station. Mallina had suffered from several years drought so Cooke was keen to secure new pastures. The first official lease was granted to D. MacKay in 1890 for an area of 20,000 acres (8,094 ha).

In 1915, the property was carrying 10,000 head of cattle. It is situated south of Mulga Downs Station, once owned by Lang Hancock and presently owned by his daughter Gina Rinehart.

A nearby 69-metre (226 ft) bridge crossing the Fortescue River to service the cattle industry was constructed in the late 1920s.
