= Droughtmaster =

Australian breed of cattle

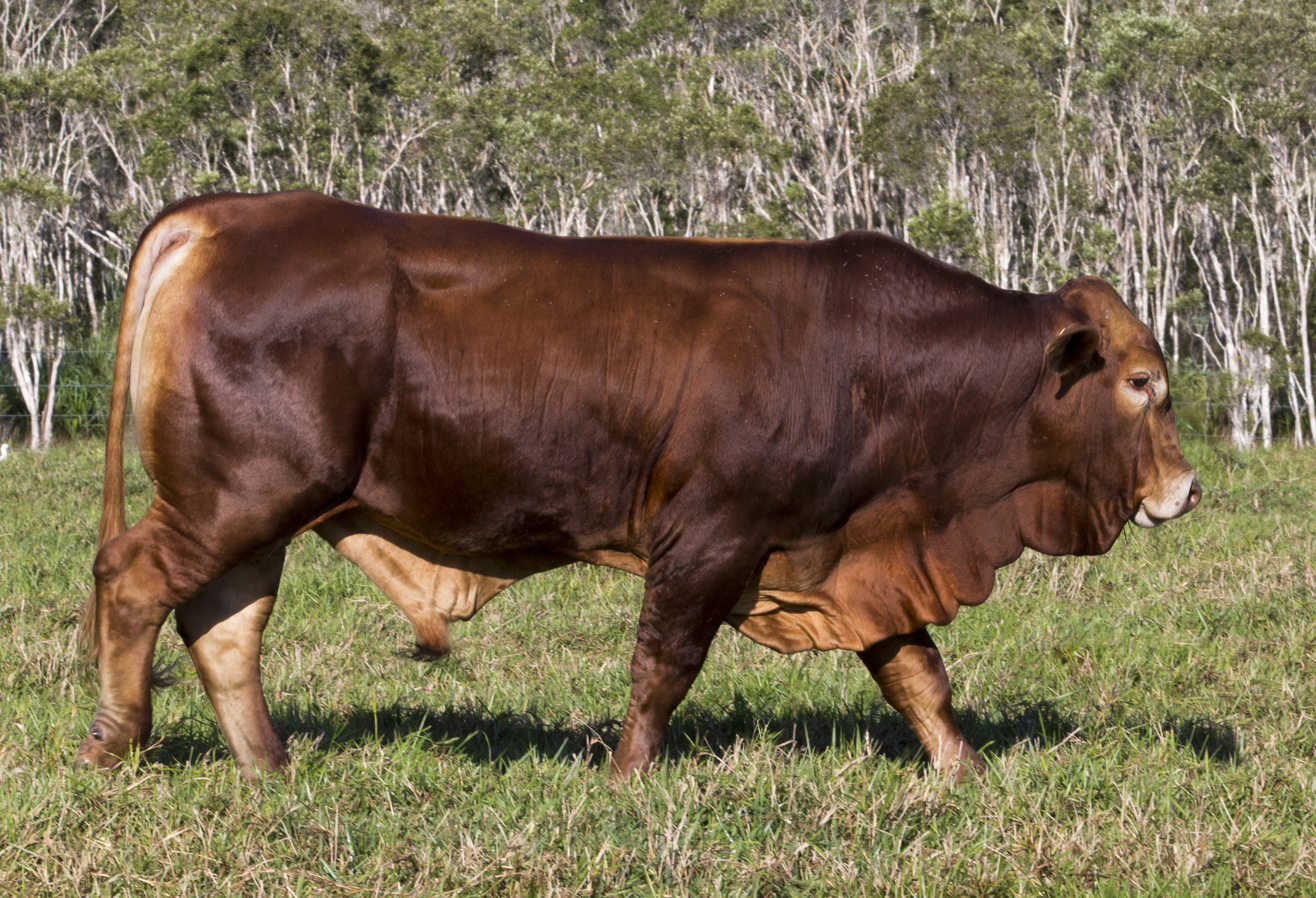
- A young bull

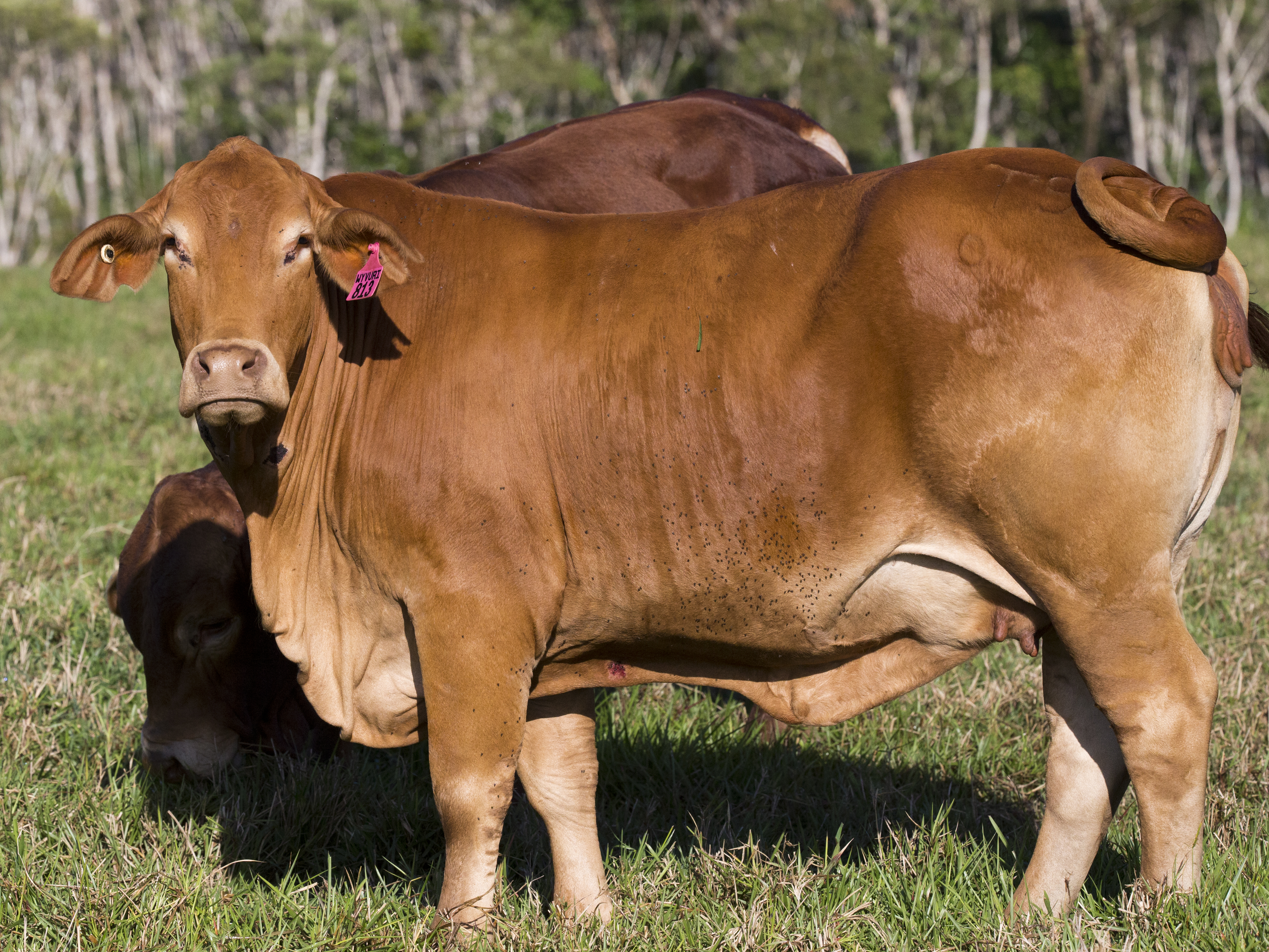
- A cow
- Conservation status: FAO (2007): not at risk; DAD-IS (2025): not at risk
- Country of origin: Australia
- Standard: Droughtmaster Stud Breeders' Society
- Use: beef

Traits
- Weight: Male: 1000 kg; Female: 695 kg
- Height: Male: 168 cm; Female: 137 cm
- Coat: red
- Horn status: horned or polled
- Cattle; Hybrid Bos (primigenius) taurus/indicus

The Droughtmaster is an Australian breed of beef cattle. It was developed from about 1915 in North Queensland by crossing zebuine cattle with cattle of British origin, principally the Beef Shorthorn. It was the first Australian taurindicine hybrid breed; it is approximately 50% Bos indicus and 50% Bos taurus.

== History ==
The Droughtmaster was developed in North Queensland, where environmental conditions – the cattle ticks which had recently been introduced to the area, the seasonally-variable tropical climate and the low levels of protein in pastures during the summer months – made it uneconomical to rear cattle of European breeds. A grey-blue zebu bull – formerly the property of the Melbourne Zoo – was brought into the area by a breeder named McDowall in 1911; its progeny included two red half-bred (taurindicine) bulls. From about 1930 these were crossed on cows of British origin, principally Beef Shorthorn and Shorthorn–Devon cross-breeds. Other British breeds, mainly Hereford, were later used. Much of the development was done by one breeder, R.L. Atkinson.

In 1956 breeders decided to focus on red cattle only; the Droughtmaster name proposed by Atkinson was adopted. A breed society, the Droughtmaster Stud Breeders' Society, was formed, and a herd-book was started.

From 1969, five Droughtmaster bulls were used for cross-breeding with the local Bhagnari in the Baluchistan province of Pakistan, leading to the creation of the Nari Master.

The Droughtmaster has been exported to several countries in Africa (Botswana, Namibia, Nigeria and Zimbabwe), Oceania (Papua New Guinea, Samoa), South and Central America (Brazil, Guatemala, Honduras and Mexico) and South-East Asia (Malaysia, the Philippines and Viet Nam). Population numbers are reported to DAD-IS by four countries, of which three – Australia, Mexico and Namibia – report numbers between 5000 and 10000. In 2025 the total population world-wide was estimated at 21473, and the conservation status of the breed was listed as "not at risk".

== Characteristics ==
The Droughtmaster is always red; the coat is short and soft. Sexual dimorphism is marked: average weights are 695 kg for cows and 1000 kg for bulls; the minimum weights specified in the breed standard are 645 kg and 900 kg respectively. Average heights at the withers are 137 cm for cows and 168 cm for bulls. The cattle may be either horned or naturally polled.

== Use ==
It is a beef breed, and is reared particularly in areas with a high incidence of drought, heat, tick-borne disease and sun damage.
