= Homestead (building) =

Single or small group of buildings belonging to a homesteader

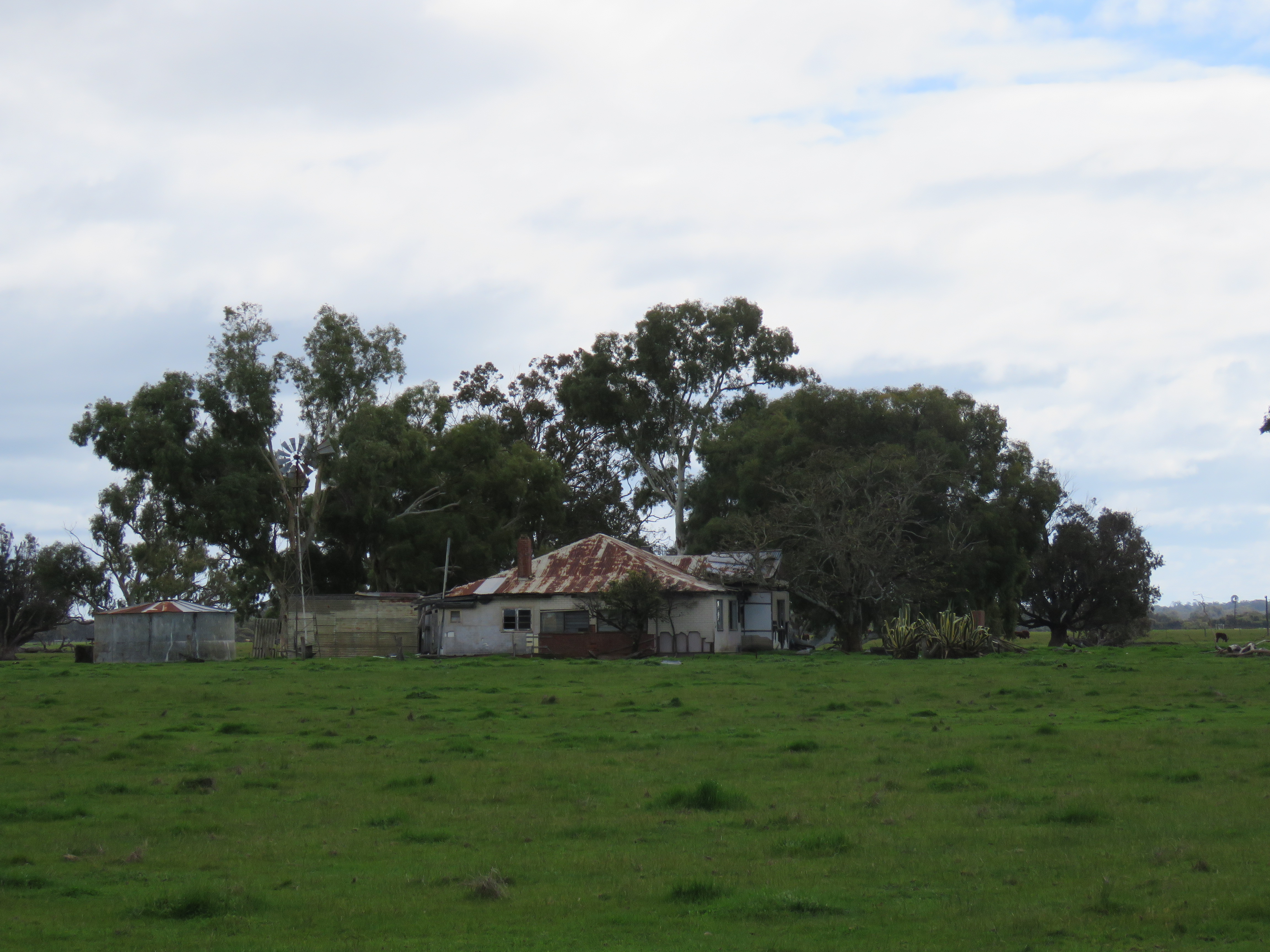
An abandoned homestead in Western Australia

A homestead is an isolated dwelling, especially a farmhouse, and adjacent outbuildings, typically on a large agricultural holding such as a ranch or station.

In North America the word "homestead" historically referred to land claimed by a settler or squatter under the Homestead Acts (United States) or the Dominion Lands Act (Canada). In Old English, the term was used to mean a human settlement, and in Southern Africa the term is used for a cluster of several houses normally occupied by a single extended family.

In Australia, it refers to the owner's house and the associated outbuildings of a pastoral property, known as a station. Some large and historic homesteads, especially those that resemble a mansion with large tracts of farmland, are often called "estates", and can be analogous to the English country house, châteaux, or a schloss, but are much younger and modest compared to their European counterparts. Examples include Booloominbah and Iandra Castle.

== See also ==
- Homestead principle
- Homesteading
- List of homesteads in Western Australia
- List of historic homesteads in Australia
- Settlement hierarchy
