= Gascoyne =

- Region
- Interactive map of Gascoyne
- Coordinates: 22°S 115°E
- Country: Australia
- State: Western Australia
- LGAs: Shire of Carnarvon; Shire of Exmouth; Shire of Shark Bay; Shire of Upper Gascoyne

Government
  - State electorate: North West Central
  - Federal division: Durack

Area
  - Total: 135,073.8 km^{2} (52,152.3 sq mi)

Population
  - Total: 9,277 (2019)
  - Density: 0.068681/km^{2} (0.177883/sq mi)

The Gascoyne region is one of the nine regions of Western Australia. It is located in the northwest of Western Australia, and consists of the local government areas of Carnarvon, Exmouth, Shark Bay and Upper Gascoyne. The Gascoyne has about 600 kilometres (370 mi) of Indian Ocean coastline; extends inland about 500 kilometres (310 mi); and has an area of 135,073.8 square kilometres (52,152.3 sq mi), including islands.

== Population ==
The Gascoyne has the lowest population of any region of Western Australia, with about 9,277 people. The majority of residents are non-Aboriginal people born in Australia (74%). Just over half live in Carnarvon (4,426) where Aboriginal residents account for 18% of the population. Other centres are Exmouth, Denham, Gascoyne Junction and Coral Bay.

== Climate ==
The Gascoyne has a moderate arid tropical climate. It is generally warm all year round, with mean maximum daily temperatures ranging from 22 °C (72 °F) in July to 35 °C (95 °F) in January. The region receives about 320 days of sunshine per year. Annual rainfall is low and variable, averaging about 200 mm (8 in), most of which occurs as a result of cyclonic activity. Because of the semi-arid climate, most of the Gascoyne is covered in scrub, primarily spinifex and mulga, with very little tree cover.

== Economy ==
Horticulture is the major industry of the Gascoyne region. Bananas, tomatoes, grapefruit, mangoes, table grapes and a range of vegetable products are grown along the Gascoyne River. Climatic advantages enable the growers to meet out-of-season demand both locally and in export markets.

Fishing is also a major industry with prawn, scallop, crab and wet line fishing operations based in Carnarvon and Exmouth. In the mining sector, salt and gypsum are mined at Lake MacLeod, north of Carnarvon.

Tourism is an important industry, due to the warm dry climate and the long coastline, which includes the Ningaloo Reef and the Shark Bay World Heritage Site.

The pastoral industry was historically important but is no longer a major contributor to the economy. It represents the region's main land use: in 1994 84% of the Gascoyne's land area was covered by pastoral leases.

== History ==
Before being settled by Europeans, the Gascoyne had been home to Indigenous Australians for thousands of years. The first known European to land in the region was Dirk Hartog in 1616; other early visitors include Willem Jansz, William Dampier, Nicolas Baudin, and Phillip King.

In September 1834 the presence of pearl shell and guano were noted by Thomas Hunt of the schooner Monkey, while searching for the wreck of the barque Mercury. Shark Bay became the site of Australia's first pearling industry when production of mother-of-pearl began in January 1850.

In 1839, George Grey explored the area and named the Gascoyne River after Captain John Gascoyne RN, son of Bamber Gascoyne, a Lord Commissioner of the Admiralty. Captain Gascoyne was a committee member of the London-based Western Australian Missionary Society and a member of the London Association for the Protection of the Interests of the Colony.

In 1858 Francis Gregory explored the region and subsequently publicized it as highly suitable to pastoralism. Settlement began in the 1860s, and the town of Carnarvon was gazetted in 1883.

By 1880 the area was home to approximately 20,000 sheep on a number of sheep stations in the area.

In 2021, four-year old girl Cleo Smith was abducted and later found in Carnarvon.

== 2010 floods ==
- December 2010 Gascoyne River flood

== See also ==
- North West Australia
