= List of ranches and stations =

This is a list of ranches and sheep and cattle stations, organized by continent. Most of these are notable either for the large geographic area which they cover, or for their historical or cultural importance.

== Africa ==
- Obudu Cattle Ranch
- SODEPA cattle ranches in Cameroon

== Australia ==
Station is the term used in Australia for large sheep or cattle properties.

=== New South Wales ===
- Borrona Downs Station
- Brindabella Station
- Caryapundy Station
- Cooplacurripa Station
- Corona Station
- Dunlop Station
- Elsinora
- Momba Station
- Mount Gipps Station
- Mount Poole Station
- Mundi Mundi
- Nocoleche
- Oxley Station
- Poolamacca Station
- Salisbury Downs Station
- Sturts Meadows Station
- Thurloo Downs
- Toorale Station
- Uardry
- Urisino
- Yancannia Station

=== Northern Territory ===
For a complete list see also: List of pastoral leases in the Northern Territory

- Alexandria Station
- Ambalindum
- Alroy Downs
- Amburla
- Amungee Mungee
- Andado
- Angas Downs Indigenous Protected Area
- Anningie Station
- Anthony Lagoon
- Argadargada Station
- Austral Downs
- Auvergne Station
- Ban Ban Springs Station
- Banka Banka Station
- Beetaloo
- Bradshaw Station
- Brunette Downs Station
- Bullo River Station
- Bunda Station
- Camfield Station
- Coniston Station
- Coolibah Station
- Crown Point Station
- Curtin Springs
- Deep Well Station
- Delamere Station
- Dungowan Station
- Elsey Station
- Epenarra Station
- Erldunda
- Fish River Station (became a wildlife reserve)
- Hamilton Downs Station
- Helen Springs Station
- Henbury Station
- Horseshoe Bend Station
- Inverway Station
- Kalala Station
- Killarney Station
- Kirkimbie
- La Belle Station
- Lake Nash Station
- Legune Station
- Limbunya
- Litchfield Station
- Lucy Creek Station
- Mallapunyah
- Manners Creek Station
- Marqua Station
- Maryvale Station
- Mittiebah Station
- Moroak
- Mount Bundy Station
- Mount Doreen Station
- Mount Ebenezer
- Mount Riddock Station
- Mount Sanford Station
- Muckaty Station
- Napperby Station
- Narwietooma Station
- Newcastle Waters Station
- Newry Station
- Pine Hill Station
- Riveren
- Rocklands Station
- Stapleton Station
- Supplejack Downs
- Tanami Downs
- Tanumbirini
- Tempe Downs Station
- The Garden Station
- Tipperary Station
- Tobermorey
- Ucharonidge Station
- Undoolya Station
- Victoria River Downs Station
- Walhallow Station
- Wave Hill Station
- Welltree
- Wollogorang Station
- Wongalara Sanctuary (previously Wongalara Station)
- Yambah Station

=== Queensland ===
- Adria Downs
- Annandale Station
- Aramac Station
- Arabella Station
- Arrabury
- Augustus Downs Station
- Bexley Station
- Boorara Station
- Bowen Downs Station
- Bullockhead Station
- Bulloo Downs Station
- Butcher's Hill (cattle station)
- Canobie Station
- Carandotta Station
- Claraville Station
- Connemara Station
- Cooinda
- Coorabulka
- Cubbie Station
- Currawilla
- Dagworth Station
- Davenport Downs Station
- Delta Downs Station
- Diamantina Lakes Station (became Diamantina National Park)
- Dillalah
- Dunbar Station
- Durham Downs Station
- Durrie Station
- Elderslie Station
- Esmeralda Station
- Gipsy Plains
- Glencoe Station
- Glengyle Station
- Glenormiston Station
- Headingly Station
- Iffley Station
- Isis Downs Station
- Jervoise Station
- Kangerong Station
- Keeroongooloo
- Kynuna Station
- Lyndhurst pastoral station
- Marion Downs Station
- Millungera Station
- Mittagong Station
- Morney Plains Station
- Mount Margaret Station
- Mywyn
- Nappa Merrie
- Naryilco
- Natal Downs
- Nockatunga Station
- Palparara
- Riversleigh Station
- Rowanlea Station
- South Galway Station
- Strathmore Station
- Tanbar Station
- Thylungra
- Tickalara
- Valley of Lagoons Station
- Warbreccan
- Wellshot Station
- Wondoola
- Yacamunda Station

=== South Australia ===
- Alton Downs Station
- Andamooka Station
- Angepena
- Angorichina
- Anlaby Station
- Anna Creek Station
- Arckaringa Station
- Arcoona
- Arkaba Station
- Beltana
- Billa Kalina
- Bloods Creek Station
- Bon Bon Reserve (previously Bon Bon Station)
- Boolcoomatta Reserve (previously Boolcoomatta Station)
- Bulgunnia Station
- Bundaleer
- Canowie Station
- Carriewerloo
- Clifton Hills Station
- Collinsville Station
- Commonwealth Hill Station
- Cordillo Downs
- Corunna Station
- Cowarie Station
- Dalhousie Station
- Dulkaninna
- Eringa Station
- Hiltaba
- Holowiliena Station
- Innamincka Station
- Kalamurina Sanctuary (previously Kalamurina Station)
- Kanyaka Station
- Kappawanta
- Ketchowla Station
- Kirkala
- Koomooloo
- Lambina
- Macumba Station
- Merty Merty Station
- Mikkira
- Moolawatana Station
- Moolooloo
- Moonaree
- Mount Eba Station
- Mount Nor' West
- Mount Victor Station
- Mulka Station
- Muloorina
- Mundowdna Station
- Munduney
- Mungeranie Station
- Murnpeowie
- Myrtle Springs Station
- Nilpena
- Nonning
- Old Koomooloo
- Oulnina
- Pandie Pandie Station
- Paney Station
- Parakylia
- Puttapa
- Quinyambie
- Redcliffe Station
- Roxby Downs Station
- Stuart Creek Station
- Talia Station
- Tinga Tingana
- Todmorden Station
- Wallerberdina Station
- Warrioota
- Welbourne Hill Station
- Wilgena Station
- Winnowie
- Wirrealpa
- Witchelina
- Wooltana Station
- Woolundunga Station
- Yardea

=== Victoria ===
- Neds Corner Station
- Wonnangatta Station
- Wooloomanata Station

=== Western Australia ===
- Abydos Station
- Adelong Station
- Albion Downs
- Alice Downs
- Anna Plains Station
- Annean Station
- Argyle Downs
- Arubiddy Station
- Ashburton Downs
- Atley Station
- Austin Downs
- Avondale Agricultural Research Station
- Badja Station
- Balfour Downs Station
- Balgair
- Balla Balla Station
- Balline Station
- Bandya Station
- Banjawarn station
- Barnong Station
- Barwidgee Station
- Bedford Downs Station
- Beebyn Station
- Belele Station
- Beringarra Station
- Bidgemia
- Billabalong Station
- Billiluna Station
- Binthalya Station
- Bonney Downs Station
- Boodanoo Station
- Boodarie Station
- Boogardie Station
- Boolaloo
- Boolardy
- Boolathana Station
- Boologooroo
- Boonderoo
- Bow River Station
- Brick House Station
- Brooking Springs
- Bulga Downs Station
- Bulloo Downs Station
- Bunnawarra
- Burnabbie
- Byro Station
- Callagiddy
- Callawa Station
- Cardabia
- Carlton Hill Station
- Charnley River Station
- Cherrabun
- Chirritta
- Cobra Station
- Cogla Downs Station
- Coongan Station
- Cooya Pooya
- Corunna Downs Station
- Credo Station
- Croydon Station
- De Grey Station
- Doolgunna
- Doorawarrah
- Drysdale River Station
- Edjudina
- El Questro Wilderness Park
- Ellenbrae
- Emu Creek Station
- Erlistoun
- Ethel Creek Station
- Ettrick Station
- Exmouth Gulf Station
- Fossil Downs Station
- Fraser Range Station
- Gabyon Station
- Giralia
- Glenflorrie
- Glenorn
- Glenroy Station
- Globe Hill Station
- Gnaraloo
- Gogo Station
- Hamersley Station
- Hooley Station
- Ivanhoe Station
- Jimba Jimba Station
- Juna Downs
- Kadji Kadji
- Kalli Station
- Karbar Station
- Kimberley Downs
- Kinclaven Station
- Kirkalocka
- Kooline
- Koordarrie
- Korong Station
- Lake Way Station
- Lake Wells Station
- Lalla Rookh Station
- Landor Station
- Lansdowne Station
- Laverton Downs
- Leinster Downs
- Liveringa
- Louisa Downs Station
- Madura Station
- Mallina Station
- Mandora Station
- Mardie Station
- Maroonah
- Marillana
- Marrilla
- Meda Station
- Meedo
- Meka Station
- Melangata Station
- Mertondale Station
- Middalya Station
- Mileura Station
- Millstream Station
- Milly Milly
- Minara Station
- Minderoo Station
- Minilya Station
- Moola Bulla
- Moorarie Station
- Mornington Station
- Mount Augustus Station
- Mount Barnett Station
- Mount Celia Station
- Mount Clere Station
- Mount Edgar Station
- Mount Elizabeth Station
- Mount Elvire Station
- Mount Florence Station
- Mount Gould Station
- Mount Hart Station
- Mount House Station
- Mount Keith Station
- Mount Minnie Station
- Mount Narryer
- Mount Vernon Station
- Mount Welcome Station
- Muccan Station
- Mulga Downs Station
- Mundrabilla Station
- Murgoo Station
- Murrum Station
- Myroodah
- Nambi
- Nanutarra Station
- Napier Downs
- Ningaloo Station
- Noonkanbah Station
- Nookawarra Station
- Noreena Downs Station
- Nyang Station
- Pardoo Station
- Paroo Station
- Peedamulla
- Pilga Station
- Pippingarra
- Pinnacles Station
- Prairie Downs
- Prenti Downs
- Pyramid Station
- Quanbun Downs Station
- Quobba
- Rawlinna Station
- Rocklea Station
- Roebuck Plains Station
- Ruby Plains Station
- Sherlock Station
- Springvale Station
- Sturt Meadows Station
- Tangadee
- Tarmoola Station
- Three Rivers Station
- Thundelarra
- Tibradden Station
- Turee Creek Station
- Uaroo
- Ullawarra
- Wallal
- Warrawagine
- Warroora
- Windidda
- Wonganoo
- Wooleen Station
- Wooramel Station
- Wyloo
- Yakabindie
- Yanrey
- Yardie Creek Station
- Yarrabubba
- Yarragadee Station
- Yarraquin
- Yarraloola
- Yarrie Station
- Yeeda Station
- Yeelirrie Station
- Yerilla Station
- Yuin Station
- Yuinmery
- Youanmi Downs
- Yundamindera Station

== North America ==
=== Canada ===
- Douglas Lake Ranch
- Gang Ranch
- Bar U Ranch
- OH Ranch

=== Mexico ===
- Sánchez Navarro ranch

=== United States ===
==== Arizona ====
- Lee's Ferry and Lonely Dell Ranch

==== California ====
- Conaway Ranch
- Harris Ranch
- Hollister Ranch
- Keys Desert Queen Ranch
- (former) Rancho Santa Margarita y Las Flores -- became Marine Corps Base Camp Pendleton
- Tejon Ranch

==== Colorado ====
- Flying W Ranch
- Latigo Ranch
- SLW Ranch
- Trinchera Ranch
- Vermejo Park Ranch

==== Florida ====
- Adams Ranch
- Babcock Ranch, Florida

==== Hawaiʻi ====
- Parker Ranch

==== Montana ====
- Grant–Kohrs Ranch National Historic Site

==== Nebraska ====
- Spade Ranch (Nebraska)

==== New Mexico ====
- Bell Ranch
- Cow Springs Ranch
- Imus Ranch
- Philmont Scout Ranch
- Vermejo Reserve

==== Oklahoma ====
- Miller Brothers 101 Ranch

==== Oregon ====
- David L. Shirk Ranch
- Roba Ranch
- Whitehorse Ranch

==== Texas ====
- (former) Allen Ranch
- A. S. Gage Ranch
- Four Sixes Ranch
- JA Ranch
- Kenedy Ranch
- King Ranch
- Michaelis Ranch
- Prairie Chapel Ranch
- Southfork Ranch
- (former) Spade Ranch (Texas)
- Waggoner Ranch
- XIT Ranch

==== Utah ====
- Deseret Ranches
- Hardware Ranch

==== Wyoming ====
- Snake River Ranch
- TA Ranch Historic District

== Oceania ==
=== New Zealand ===
Run or station is the term used in New Zealand for large sheep or cattle properties.

- Akitio
- Brancepeth Station
- Castle Hill
- Double Hill Station, located on the Rakaia River
- Erewhon Station, named after a fictitious place (based on Mesopotamia Station) in Samuel Butler's book "Erewhon"
- Flock Hill
- Glenaray Station
- Maraekakaho
- Marainanga
- Matanaka Farm
- Mesopotamia Station
- Molesworth Station
- St James Station (became conservation land)
- Terawhiti Station
- Walter Peak Station
- Mount Nicholas Station

== South America ==
- Dadanawa Ranch
- Estancia Harberton
- Finca Los Alamos
- Hacienda Nápoles

== See also ==
- Cattle station
- Estancia
- Guest ranch
- Hacienda
- Movie ranch
- Sheep station
- Station (Australian agriculture)
- Station (New Zealand agriculture)
- List of historic ranches in British Columbia
- List of the largest stations in Australia
