= Coolibah Station =

Pastoral lease in the Northern Territory

Coordinates: 15.551°S 130.961°E

Location in Northern Territory

Coolibah Station is a pastoral lease that operates as a cattle station in the Northern Territory of Australia.

It is situated about 53 kilometres (33 mi) east of Timber Creek and 184 kilometres (114 mi) south west of Katherine, with the homestead situated along the Victoria River.

The 5,000-square-kilometre (1,931 sq mi) property, running 80,000 head of cattle, is leased by Milton Jones. Jones, who owns a helicopter business specializing in aerial mustering, leased the property from the Crown in 1988 with cash. The station is best known for being the location of the reality television program Keeping up with the Joneses.

The property was leased by Patrick Quilty, the son of Tom Quilty, in 1938. Quilty Sr leased Glenore Station and Euroka Springs Station, both of which were passed onto his sons. Prior to his death in 1938 Patrick Quilty and his brother Tom leased Bradshaw Station, Coolibah Station and Bedford Downs Station.

A Dragon Rapide aeroplane, of Connellan Airways, crashed at Coolibah in 1949. The head stockman, an Aboriginal man named Jack Brumby, was recommended for a gallantry award for rescuing the pilot.

In 1953 the station was regarded as the third largest in Australia, with an area of 7,000 square miles (18,130 km^{2}). The manager of the day, Hugh Byers, was committed to stand trial for the theft of 88 head of cattle from neighbouring Victoria River Downs Station.

In the same year filming of the Charles Chauvel movie Jedda was commenced at Coolibah.

== See also ==
- List of ranches and stations
