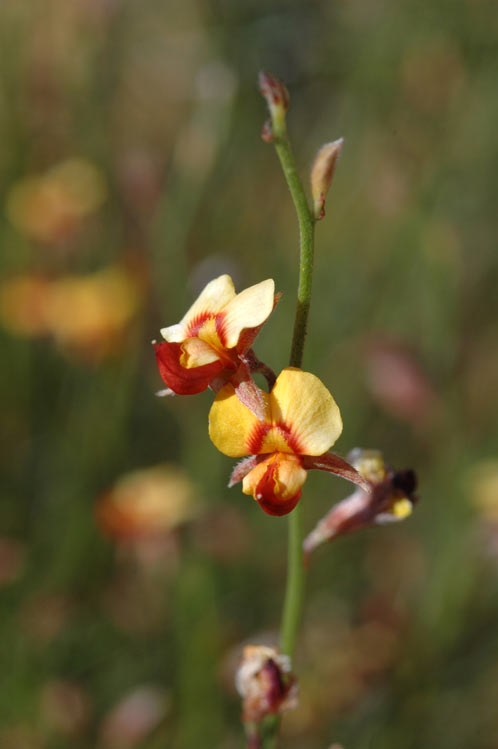

Conservation status
- Priority Three — Poorly Known Taxa (DEC)

Scientific classification
- Kingdom: Plantae
- Clade: Tracheophytes
- Clade: Angiosperms
- Clade: Eudicots
- Clade: Rosids
- Order: Fabales
- Family: Fabaceae
- Subfamily: Faboideae
- Genus: Jacksonia
- Species: J. anthoclada

Binomial name
- Jacksonia anthoclada Chappill

= Jacksonia arenicola =

Species of legume

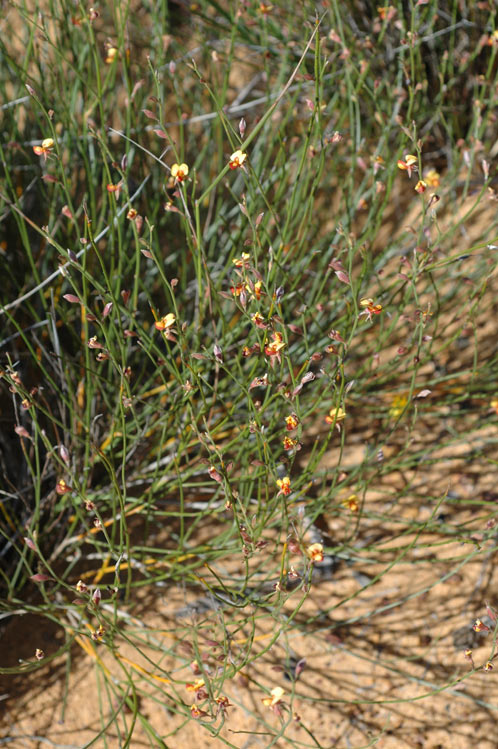
Habit north of Binnu, Western Australia

Jacksonia arenicola is a species of flowering plant in the family Fabaceae and is endemic to the south-west of Western Australia. It is an erect, broom-like shrub with densely hairy, sharply-pointed phylloclades, yellow-orange flowers with red markings, and woody pods that are hairy at first, later glabrous.

== Description ==
Jacksonia arenicola is a tufted, broom-like shrub that typically grows up to 0.2–1 m (7.9 in – 3 ft 3.4 in) high and about 1 m (3 ft 3 in) wide, its branches greyish-green. Its phylloclades are densely hairy with white hairs, 0.8–1.6 mm (0.031–0.063 in) wide at their midpoint. The leaves are reduced to broadly egg-shaped, dark brown to black, scale leaves 1.5–2 mm (0.059–0.079 in) long, 0.9–1.4 mm (0.035–0.055 in) wide. The flowers are arranged scattered along the branches on a pedicel 2.2–2.4 mm (0.087–0.094 in) long. There are egg-shaped bracteoles 1.5–2 mm (0.059–0.079 in) long and 0.9–1.4 mm (0.035–0.055 in) wide on the pedicels. The floral tube is 0.9–1.0 mm (0.035–0.039 in) long and the sepals are membranous, the lobes 3.3–4.2 mm (0.13–0.17 in) long and 1.4–2.0 mm (0.055–0.079 in) wide. The standard petal is yellow-orange with red markings, 4.2–5.7 mm (0.17–0.22 in) long, the wings yellow-orange without markings, 4.2–5.8 mm (0.17–0.23 in) long, and the keel deep red, 4.3–5.2 mm (0.17–0.20 in) long. The stamens have white filaments 3.2–5.5 mm (0.13–0.22 in) long. Flowering occurs from July to November, and the fruit is a woody, densely hairy at first, later glabrous, broadly elliptic pod, 5.0–5.3 mm (0.20–0.21 in) long and 3.5–4.1 mm (0.14–0.16 in) wide.

== Taxonomy ==
Jacksonia arenicola was first formally described in 2007 by Jennifer Anne Chappill in Australian Systematic Botany from specimens collected 7 km (4.3 mi) east of the North West Coastal Highway on Nabawa Road, by Chappill and Carolyn F. Wilkins in 1991. The specific epithet (arenicola) means 'an inhabitant of a sandy place'.

== Distribution and habitat ==
This species of Jacksonia grows in woodland or shrubland on sand on sandplains and sandhills between Shark Bay and Eneabba and east to Gabyon Station, in the Avon Wheatbelt, Carnarvon, Coolgardie, Geraldton Sandplains and Yalgoo bioregions in the south-west of Western Australia.

== Conservation status ==
Jacksonia anthoclada is listed as "not threatened" by the Government of Western Australia, Department of Biodiversity, Conservation and Attractions.
