= List of State Register of Heritage Places in the Town of Port Hedland =

The State Register of Heritage Places is maintained by the Heritage Council of Western Australia. As of 2026, 81 places are heritage-listed in the Town of Port Hedland, of which seven are on the State Register of Heritage Places.

== List ==
The Western Australian State Register of Heritage Places, as of 2026, lists the following seven state registered places within the Town of Port Hedland:

Place name	Place #	Location	Suburb or town	Co-ordinates	Built	State registered	Notes	Photo
Dalgety House	3357	6 Anderson Street	Port Hedland	20°18′48″S 118°34′37″E	1901	14 May 1999	An uncommon example in the towns of the north-west of a relatively intact residence from the early years of the twentieth century	
District Medical Officer's Quarters (former)	2286	Corner McKay & Richardson Street	Port Hedland	20°18′36″S 118°34′40″E	1907	17 March 2006	Also referred to as Medical Staff Quarters and The Green House; A rare surviving example of a Federation Bungalow style single skin timber framed residence built in the north-west in the pre-World War One period	
Lock Hospital (former) and Burial Ground	5948	34 Sutherland Street	Port Hedland	20°18′34″S 118°36′03″E	1919	4 September 2019	The only extant remains of a lock hospital in Western Australia; Representative of the official government policy of treating Aboriginal and non-Aboriginal patients in separate medical facilities	
Mundabullangana Station	4004	North West Coastal Highway	Mundabullangana	20°31′10″S 118°03′34″E	1878	16 May 2008	A Victorian-Georgian style homestead; The first pastoral lease taken up in the region south-west of Port Hedland	
Mundabullangana Wool Shed - Shearing Shed	18445	North West Coastal Highway	Mundabullangana	20°31′10″S 118°03′34″E	1930		Part of Mundabullangana Station Precinct (4004); A former two-storey shearing shed, now demolished	
St Matthew's Anglican Church	2285	Lot 37 Edgar Street	Port Hedland	20°18′43″S 118°34′37″E	1917	1 March 1994	Also referred to as Art Gallery and Exhibition Centre and Olde St Matthew's Church; A simple timber building with a corrugated iron roof, built to replace the previous church (built 1908), which had been destroyed by fire; Demolished in 2003 due to extensive termite damage	
De Grey - Mullewa Stock Route No. 9701	5113	Through Woodenooka & Tallering Peak from Mullewa			1870	7 December 2022	Also referred to as De Gray Mullewa Stock Route; A 1,500 kilometre stock route from Mullewa to just east of the De Grey River, near Port Hedland	
