= Claraville Station =

Pastoral lease in Queensland, Australia

Coordinates: 18.65948°S 141.71234°E

Location in Queensland

Claraville Station is a pastoral lease that currently operates as a cattle station in Queensland.

It is located approximately 7 kilometres (4 mi) south west of Croydon and 128 kilometres (80 mi) south east of Normanton in the gulf country of Queensland. The property is composed of open forest country with softer area of frontage country along the Clara and Yappar Rivers and their tributaries. There are good stands of Mitchell grass, spearwood and spinifex throughout, along with edible shrubs such as verano and stylos.

The channel systems support areas of coolibah, gum and box trees that extend into wattle. The property is divided into 10 main paddocks, 6 smaller paddocks and numerous holding paddocks. The main house at the homestead was built in 2005.

Clareville was established at some time prior to 1884, when it was acquired by the Rochfort brothers, who also owned Dotswood and Wallabadah Stations. By 1891 the property was owned by A. S. Haydon, occupied an area of 700 square miles (1,813 km^{2}) and ws stocked with 2,000 cattle.

Jack Campbell and John Thomas Willcox owned the property in 1925, with Campbell managing the station.

The Priestley brothers owned the station in 1952, which had been a dry season and the herd had been reduced to 2,000 head, 1,000 of which were transferred to Wondoola Station.

In 2013 the property was placed on the market by Sydney-based owners Mike and Kim Sergeant. Claraville occupies an area of 2,170 square kilometres (838 sq mi) and was stocked with 10,000 head of cattle.

== See also ==
- List of ranches and stations
