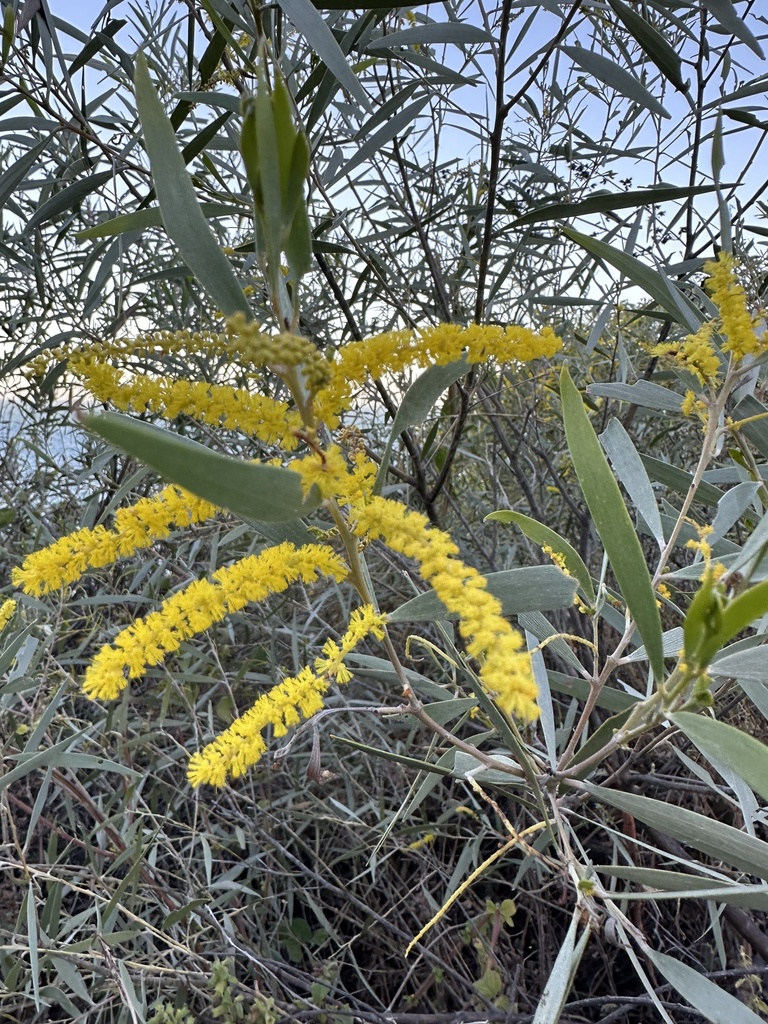
- On Magnetic Island

Scientific classification
- Kingdom: Plantae
- Clade: Embryophytes
- Clade: Tracheophytes
- Clade: Angiosperms
- Clade: Eudicots
- Clade: Rosids
- Order: Fabales
- Family: Fabaceae
- Subfamily: Caesalpinioideae
- Clade: Mimosoid clade
- Genus: Acacia
- Species: A. leptostachya

Binomial name
- Acacia leptostachya Benth.
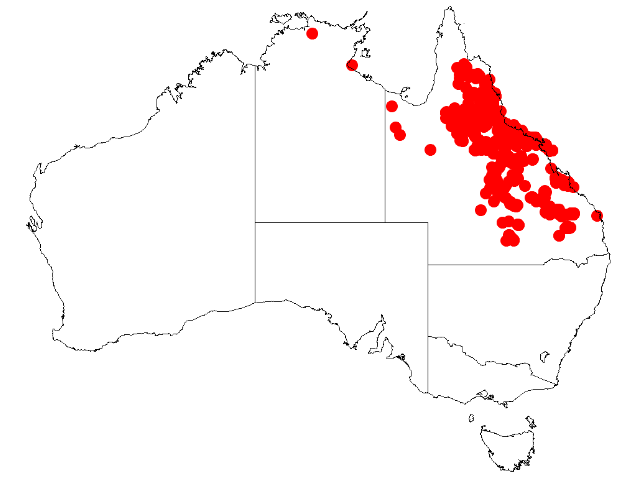
- Acacia leptostachya occurrence data from Australasian Virtual Herbarium

Synonyms
- Acacia argentea Maiden; Racosperma leptostachyum (Benth.) Pedley; Acacia conspersa auct. non F.Muell.: Domin, K. (October 1926)

= Acacia leptostachya =

Townsville wattle

Species of legume

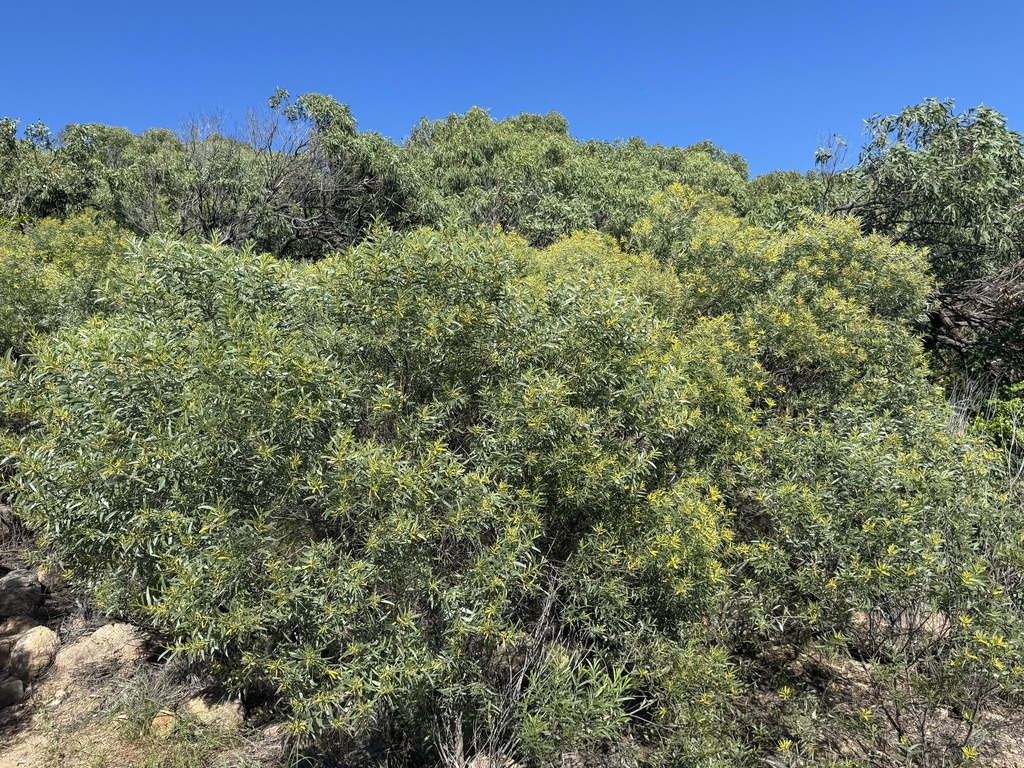
Habit, near Bowen

Acacia leptostachya, commonly known as Townsville wattle or slender wattle, is a species of flowering plant in the family Fabaceae and is endemic to Queensland, Australia. It is a small shrub or tree with branchlets usually covered with soft hairs, narrowly elliptic to lance-shaped phyllodes, spikes of golden yellow flowers, and linear, firmly papery to thinly leathery pods raised over the seeds.

== Description ==
Acacia leptostachya is a shrub or tree that typically grows to a height of 0.5–6 m (1 ft 8 in – 19 ft 8 in) and usually has soft hairs pressed against the surface and young shoots resinous but not sticky. Its phyllodes are narrowly elliptic to lance-shaped, sometimes almost linear, 40–90 mm (1.6–3.5 in) long and 2–12 mm (0.079–0.472 in) wide and contain many fine, rather closely packed veins, with two or three more prominent. The flowers are golden yellow and borne in two spikes 20–40 mm (0.79–1.57 in) long on a peduncle 1–3 mm (0.039–0.118 in) long. Flowering occurs in August and September, and the pods are linear, up to 60 mm (2.4 in) long, 2–9 mm (0.079–0.354 in) wide, firmly papery to thinly leathery glabrous, and raised over the seeds. The seeds are oblong, 2.7–4 mm (0.11–0.16 in) long and shiny brown with a small aril.

== Taxonomy ==
Acacia leptostachya was first formally described in 1864 by George Bentham in his Flora Australiensis. The specific epithet (leptostachya) is derived from the Greek words lepto meaning slender and stachys meaning ear of corn, in reference to the shape of the flower spikes.

== Distribution and habitat ==
This species of wattle grows in deep sand on sandstone or granite in eucalypt woodland, open forest or Triodia hummock grassland from the central-eastern parts of Cape York Peninsula near Coen through coastal and inland districts ae far south as Maryborough and south of Charleville. It is also found near Riversleigh Station, about 200 km (120 mi) north-west of Mount Isa.

== Conservation status ==
Acacia leptostachya is listed as 'least concern' under the Queensland Government Nature Conservation Act 1992.

== Use in horticulture ==
This species of shrub or tree grows well a full sun position in dry well drained soils. It can be propagated from seed after seeds are scarified or treated with boiling water.

== See also ==
- List of Acacia species
