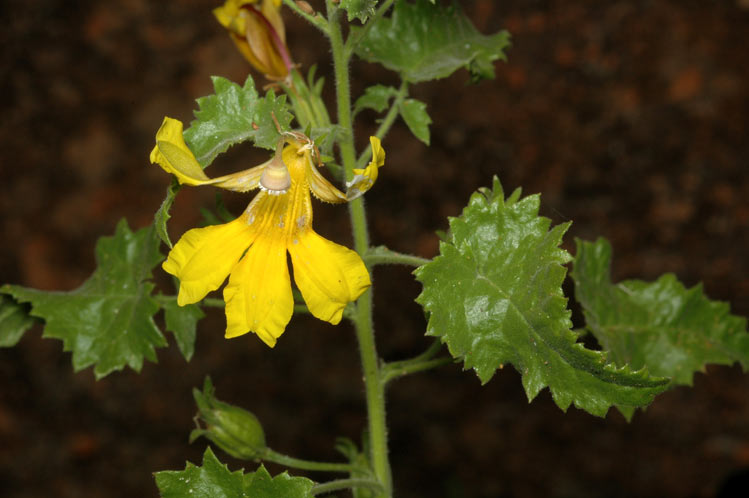

Scientific classification
- Kingdom: Plantae
- Clade: Tracheophytes
- Clade: Angiosperms
- Clade: Eudicots
- Clade: Asterids
- Order: Asterales
- Family: Goodeniaceae
- Genus: Goodenia
- Species: G. kingiana

Binomial name
- Goodenia kingiana Carolin

= Goodenia kingiana =

Species of plant

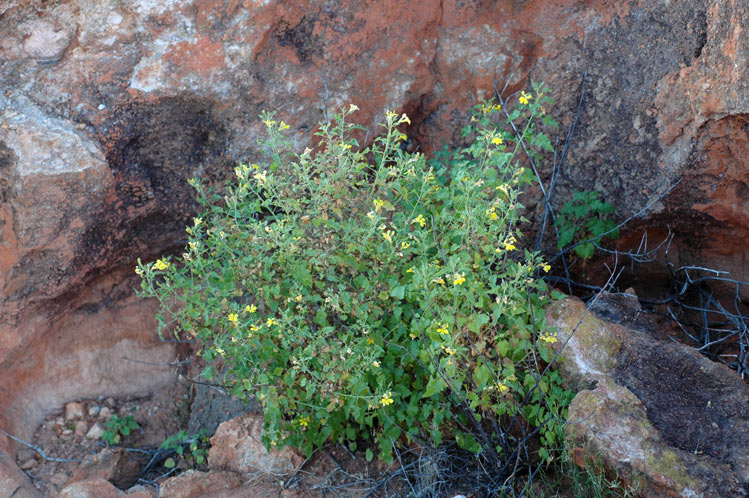
Habit near the Murchison settlement

Goodenia kingiana is a species of flowering plant in the family Goodeniaceae and is endemic to Western Australia. It is an erect shrub with deeply-lobed or divided leaves and racemes or thyrses of yellow flowers.

== Description ==
Goodenia kingiana is an erect shrub that typically grows to a height of 1.5 m (4 ft 11 in) long and is covered with sticky glandular hairs. The leaves are lyre-shaped to pinnatifid, the end leaflet egg-shaped, heart-shaped or toothed, 20–40 mm (0.79–1.57 in) long and 10–25 mm (0.39–0.98 in) wide. The petiole is 30–70 mm (1.2–2.8 in) long and the side leaflets egg-shaped to linear. The flowers are arranged in racemes or thyrses up to 120 mm (4.7 in) long with leaf-like bracts, each flower on a pedicel 15–20 mm (0.59–0.79 in) long. The sepals are lance-shaped, 4–5 mm (0.16–0.20 in) long, the corolla yellow and 25–30 mm (0.98–1.18 in) long. The lower lobes of the corolla are 14–16 mm (0.55–0.63 in) long with wings 3–4 mm (0.12–0.16 in) wide. Flowering occurs from July to October and the fruit is an oval capsule about 8 mm (0.31 in) long.

== Taxonomy and naming ==
Goodenia kingiana was first formally described in 1990 by Roger Charles Carolin in the journal Telopea from material collected by Nathaniel Speck, east of Kalli in 1965. The specific epithet (kingiana) honours Henry Sandford King who first collected this species.

== Distribution and habitat ==
This goodenia grows at the base of laterite breakaways near Cue in the Murchison and Yalgoo biogeographic regions of Western Australia.

== Conservation status ==
Goodenia kingiana is classified as "not threatened" by the Department of Environment and Conservation (Western Australia).
