= Kooline =

Pastoral lease in Western Australia

Coordinates: 22.913°S 116.289°E

Location in Western Australia

Kooline Station, often referred to as Kooline, is a pastoral lease that operates as a cattle station.

It is located about 140 kilometres (87 mi) south of Pannawonica and 200 kilometres (124 mi) south east of Onslow in the Pilbara region of Western Australia.

Kooline occupies an area of 2,043 square kilometres (789 sq mi) with the Ashburton River running through the property for a distance of about 90 kilometres (56 mi). The property shares boundaries with Ashburton Downs, Glenflorrie, Ullawarra, Wyloo and Amelia Stations as well as vacant crown land.

In 1921 the property was owned by Mr Sanderson, Michael Corbett and his two brothers, who experienced a good season followed by a drought that broke in early 1923.

== See also ==
- List of ranches and stations
