= Dillalah =

Cattle station in Queensland

Coordinates: 26.8666°S 146.0734°E

Location in Queensland

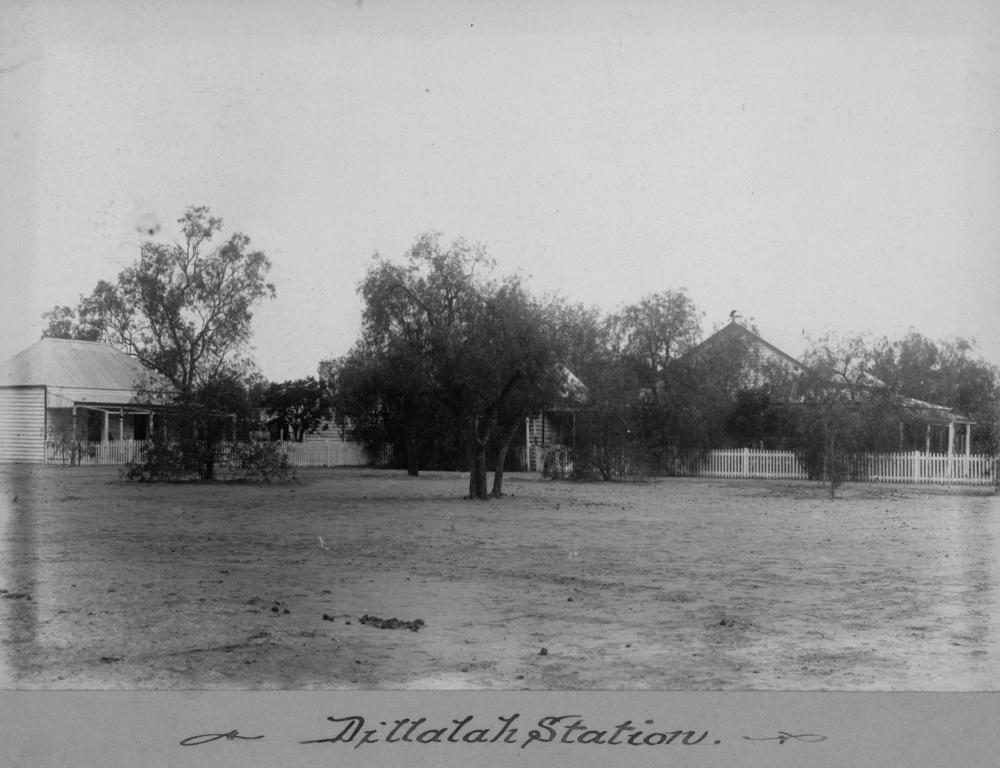
View of Dillalah Station in the Charleville district, 1902-1904

Dillalah Station is a pastoral lease that operates as a cattle station in Queensland.

The property is situated approximately 54 kilometres (34 mi) south west of Charleville and 138 kilometres (86 mi) north of Cunnamulla. The property is situated on the western side of the Warrego River and is intersected by the Nimminmulla Creek with several permanent waterholes. The country comprises open plains covered in Mulga, Saltbush, bluebush, cottonbush, Mitchell grass and yarron.

The name is Aboriginal in origin, Dillilah means Galah in the local dialect. The name is taken from a waterhole along the Warrego River.

The area was initially established prior to 1864 by Mr. W. G. Conn who still owned it in 1864 when it was stocked with 500 head of cattle. In 1869 the property was owned by Messrs Russell and Company, who put it up for sale stocked with 2,100 head of cattle. In 1873 the property was on the market again along with Yarronvale Station. Together they encompassed an area of 500 square miles (1,295 km^{2}) and were broken into 13 blocks. Stocked with 2,500 head of cattle improvements at the time included a house, kitchen, store and stockyards.

By 1876 the property occupied an area of 810 square miles (2,098 km^{2}) and was stocked with 4,200 cattle and 45 horses. The property sold at auction in 1877 for £32,000 including stock, but the buyers name was not declared. Frederick Walters was managing the property in 1878, it was owned by the Dillalah Company in 1883 with Walters still managing. /the property occupied an area of 1,000 square miles (2,590 km^{2}). The Morgan brothers owned the property in 1883 and soon introduced sheep to the run.

The state government purchased the homestead area of the run in 1916. The total area acquired was 24,000 acres (9,712 ha) stocked with 3,100 head of cattle. A total of £13,000 was paid with an extra £10,000 expected to be spent on improvements in the future.

In 2010 the property received 200 millimetres (8 in) of rain over a period of two days. The owner, Brock Hindmarsh, was looking forward to a good season with the Balonne, Warrego and Paroo Rivers all in full flood.

== See also ==
- List of ranches and stations
