= Arabella Station (Queensland) =

Pastoral lease in Queensland

Coordinates: 26.43796°S 146.4561°E

Location in Queensland

Arabella Station is a pastoral lease that currently operates as a cattle station in Queensland.

It is located approximately 22 kilometres (14 mi) east of Charleville and 70 kilometres (43 mi) south of Augathella in Queensland.

The property was established at some time prior to 1887 and in 1888 was owned by Mr McKenzie and was trading in cattle.

In 1907 Messrs Fisken and Bunning sold the property to Arnold Wienholt. The 176-square-mile (456 km^{2}) property was stocked with 2,000 cattle and 30 horses.

Messrs Keogh and Rowe sold the unstocked 100-square-mile (259 km^{2}) property in 1924 to C. E. Tidswell.

In 1938 Tidswell sold the 100-square-mile (259 km^{2}) property for £20,000 to G. H. Griffiths. It was stocked with 10,000 sheep at this time.

In 1956 the homestead was the scene of an armed robbery when a man crashed his stolen car nearby then menaced the owner, C. Starky, with a shotgun before stealing one of the station trucks.

In 2014 the 235-square-kilometre (91 sq mi) property was in the grip of drought. The owner, Greg Ballinger, had been destocking cattle since early 2013 and had used thinning permits to feed stock mulga along with supplements to keep the herd alive.

== See also ==
- List of ranches and stations
