= Warbreccan =

Pastoral lease that operates as a cattle station in Queensland, Australia

Coordinates: 24.311°S 142.845°E

Location in Queensland

Warbreccan Station is a pastoral lease that operates as a cattle station. It is located about 62 kilometres (39 mi) north of Jundah and 172 kilometres (107 mi) south west of Longreach in the outback of Queensland, Australia. The Thomson River runs through Warbreccan, giving it 15 miles (24 km) of double frontage. Currently the property occupies 155,000 hectares (383,013 acres) and has a two bedroom homestead with a three bedroom unit attached to it. A separate three bedroom open plan overseers home is located close by. Numerous creeks and permanent waterholes are found throughout the country, which is a mix of pebbly black soil open downs to the south and mulga land in the north. The downs are grassed with a mix of Mitchell and Flinders grasses.

In 1885 the proprietors of Warbreccan, Affleck and Simson, purchased 20,000 ewes to stock the property.

Approximately 2,380 sheep were stolen from the property in 1923 when it was owned by the Australian Pastoral Company. Three men were charged with the crime after trying to sell the stock to a nearby landowner.

The Felix Pastoral Company acquired the property in 1924 and remained the owner until placing the property up for auction in 1971.

In 1936 the 953,880-acre (386,022 ha) station was placed on the market along with the 64,000 sheep and 15,000 head of cattle that it was stocked with. The property had a 24 stand shearing shed and 15 bores fitted with windmills.

Warbreccan encompassed an area of 600 square miles (155,399 ha) and was subdivided into 16 main paddocks when it was put on the market in 1971. From 1963 to 1971 it had been stocked with an average of about 20,000 sheep and 600-900 cattle.

== See also ==
- List of ranches and stations
