= Keeping up with the Joneses (TV series) =

2010 Australian TV series

- Genre: Reality
- Starring: The Joneses
- Narrated by: James Blundell
- Composer: Neil Sutherland
- Country of origin: Australia
- Original language: English
- No. of seasons: 2
- No. of episodes: 16

Production
- Producer: WTFN
- Production locations: Coolibah Station, Northern Territory
- Running time: 30 minutes
- Production company: WTFN Productions

Original release
- Network: Network Ten
- Release: 14 October 2010 – 2011

Keeping up with the Joneses is an Australian reality television series that follows the life of a family on a cattle station – Coolibah Station – 600km south-west of Darwin, in the Northern Territory.

== Synopsis ==
The show follows the daily lives of the titular Jones family – father Milton and mother Cristina – and their staff as they muster cattle with helicopters, fight fires, battle floods and even wrestle crocodiles. This raw and humorous snapshot of family life shows what it takes to live in the outback. The family own over 1,000,000 acres.
