= Winnowie =

Pastoral lease in South Australia

Coordinates: 33.30842°S 138.59591°E

Location in South Australia

Winnowie Station is a pastoral lease that operates as a sheep station in South Australia.

It is situated approximately 37 kilometres (23 mi) south west of Leigh Creek and 55 kilometres (34 mi) north west of Blinman.

Brothers Samuel and Robert Stuckey in partnership with E. C. Randall acquired Winnowie in 1857. By 1859 the Stuckeys owned the property outright. Drought struck the area in 1864 and the stock was removed from the property and taken to Manuwalkaninna Station.

At some time later the property was acquired by G. W. Luxmoore who in turn sold it in 1872 to Thomas Elder for £1,125. At this time it occupied an area of 112 square miles (290 km^{2}) and adjoined Beltana Station.

== See also ==
- List of ranches and stations
