= Alice Downs =

Pastoral lease in Western Australia

Coordinates: 17.756°S 127.939°E

Location in Western Australia

Alice Downs Station is a pastoral lease that operates as a cattle station in Western Australia. As of March 2022 it is one of four stations known as the Springvale Aggregation, owned by Harvest Road.

== History ==
The property was established prior to 1901; the manager that year was F. G. Taylor. The area had been struck by ticks at the same time, though Alice Downs had not been largely affected.

The owners of the property, Yates, Taylor and Cranwell, placed the 151,000-acre (61,108 ha) property on the market in 1908, at which time it was stocked with 1,800 head of shorthorn cattle.

Frank Taylor retained possession of Alice Downs but with a new partner, H. F. Parnell, who was also known as C. H. Newman. The pair placed both Alice Downs and Panton Hills Station on the market in 1919. At this time Alice Downs occupied an area of 289,790 acres (117,274 ha) and was stocked with 3,000 head of cattle and 146 horses.

In 2003, E. G. Green and sons, the owners of Alice Downs, Springvale Station, Mabel Downs and Texas Downs with a total area of 5,850 square kilometres (2,259 sq mi) and that were carrying approximately 32,000 head of Brahman cattle, sold the aggregation to a South African buyer for A$15 million.

In March 2022, Andrew Forrest's agribusiness, Harvest Road, bought the station, along with Springvale Station, Mabel Downs, and Texas Downs, together known as the Springvale Aggregation. Together they cover 604,430 ha (1,493,600 acres) and are stocked with 35,000 head of cattle. Traditional owners of the land were keen to work with the new owners, hoping for some of the land to be developed as tourist destinations, which would create jobs for Indigenous people in a region which has few opportunities. In addition, with Forrest's known interest in improving the lives of Indigenous peoples, it is hoped that his wealth could be used to improve educational outcomes for children in the Halls Creek area.

== Description ==
Alice Downs is situated approximately 59 kilometres (37 mi) north east of Halls Creek and 86 kilometres (53 mi) south of Warmun in the Kimberley region. A portion of the Panton River flows through the property, along with many of its tributaries such as Eales Creek, Wild Dog Creek, and Purple Appleseed Creek. Stock can also be watered at numerous springs. The area consists of open downs covered with Mitchell, Flinders and bundle grasses.

As of 2003 the property occupies an area of 340,491 acres (137,792 ha).

== See also ==
- List of ranches and stations
- List of pastoral leases in Western Australia
