= Mittagong Station =

Pastoral lease in Queensland

Coordinates: 18.391°S 142.259°E

Location in Queensland

Mittagong Station is a pastoral lease that operates as a cattle station in Queensland.

The property is situated approximately 26 kilometres (16 mi) north of Croydon and 135 kilometres (84 mi) west of Georgetown.

Mittagong occupies an area of 5,000 square kilometres (1,931 sq mi).

Charles Lind sold the property in 2006 stocked with 17,500 head of cattle for A$17.5 million.

== See also ==
- List of ranches and stations
