= Oxley Station =

Coordinates: 30.897°S 147.486°E

Location in New South Wales

Oxley Station, also once often referred to as Oxley Fork Station, is a pastoral lease that operates as a sheep station in north west New South Wales, Australia.

It is situated about 65 kilometres (40 mi) west of Coonamble and 76 kilometres (47 mi) north of Warren along the banks of the Macquarie River and the edge of the Macquarie Marshes. The station is made up of both the Oxley and Ringorah leases.

The country's territory is floodplain with river alluvial soils providing good feed. It is divided into 35 paddocks and has extensive bores and tanks to complement natural water sources.

J. J Leahy acquired Oxley at some time prior to 1939. Leahy was still in possession of the property in 1950.

Oxley was acquired by Clyde Agricultural in 1998 from the Twynham Pastoral Company. Other previous owners included the Fisher family, the Berawinnia Pastoral Company and the Naroo Pastoral Company (which was owned by British Tobacco).

Placed in the market in 2010 by the Swire Group company, Clyde Agricultural, it was expected to fetch around A$24 million.

The 352.5-square-kilometre (136 sq mi) property was acquired by the Paraway Pastoral Company in 2011 and carries approximately 10,000 head of Angus and Angus cross cattle.

== See also ==
- List of ranches and stations
