= Redcliffe Station =

Pastoral lease in South Australia

Coordinates: 33.709°S 139.548°E

Location in South Australia

Redcliffe Station, also often spelled Redcliff, is a pastoral lease operating as a sheep station in South Australia.

The property is situated approximately 37 kilometres (23 mi) north of Morgan and 69 kilometres (43 mi) south east of Hallett. The property is composed of almost flat to undulating country watered by creeks, gullies and natural water catchment areas. It is lightly timbered with black oak, bull oak, sugarwood, saltbush and bluebush, and supports spear grass, bindii and other native grasses.

The property occupies an area of 39,847 hectares (98,464 acres) and was placed on the market in 2013 for A$4.85 million. The property has two homesteads: one is a four bedroom stone building that was built on the 1920s; the second is Oakleigh, built in the 1930s. Other infrastructure includes a seven bedroom shearers' quarters, a 2400 head feedlot, a six stand shearing shed and a large machinery shed. Redcliffe has a carrying capacity of approximately 14,000 head of sheep.

Redcliffe had been established prior to 1897 when it was owned by the Scott family. The Scotts sold the 27,477-acre (11,120 ha) property stocked with 2,875 sheep in 1906 to well known pastoralist R. J. M. McBride for £7,000. McBride's son, Thomas, was left to manage the property along with nearby Florieton Station. McBride senior died in 1921, at age 91, after acquiring a large area of pastoral land. The McBride family retained possession of Redcliffe with Thomas McBride running the property. By 1933 the size of the station was 60,000 acres (24,281 ha). Following a serious illness McBride placed Redcliffe and Oakleigh Stations up for auction in 1937. The properties were sold along with the 6,600 head of sheep they were stocked with. Redcliffe was owned by W. H. Sandland in 1940; he also owned Balah Station. Sandland died in 1942, and the 60,318-acre (24,410 ha) property was put up for auction in 1943. At this stage the property had a 10-room stone homestead, a four bedroom stone house, wool shed, shearers quarters, 15 dams, five wells and fully sub-divided and fenced. In 1944 the owners were A & G Tennant, who still owned the property in 1954.

In 2009 the property was acquired by Adam Hamersley who also bought nearby Pine Valley Station. Hamersley sold Pine Valley later the same year but retained Redcliffe where he continued breeding white dorper sheep.

== See also ==
- List of ranches and stations
