= Middalya Station =

Pastoral lease in Western Australia

Coordinates: 23.906°S 114.768°E

Location in Western Australia

Middalya Station is a pastoral lease that operates as a sheep station in Western Australia.

It was located 132 kilometres (82 mi) south east of Coral Bay and 256 kilometres (159 mi) north east of Denham in the Gascoyne region. The Minilya River runs through the property. The traditional owners of the area are the Tharrkari people, who currently lease and manage Ullawarra station.

The rangeland occupies an area of 1,977 square kilometres (763 sq mi), approximately 1,655 square kilometres (639 sq mi) of which is described as being in good or fair condition. It is able to be stocked with 19,350 sheep, with a flock of 15,200 being recommended. It is composed of sandplains, alluvial and stony plains and hills.

In 1887 the property was stocked with 6,000 sheep, which produced 87 bales of wool; by 1890 the flock had increased to 16,000 producing 220 bales. J. H. Mansfield, who had previously managed Karratha Station and later owned Maroonah Station, was managing Middalya in the 1880s.

Douglas John Hearman acquired Middalya at some time prior to 1897.

Middalya was placed on the market in 1902, at which time it occupied an area of 600,000 acres (242,811 ha) and was stocked with 18,000 sheep, 40 cattle and 80 horses.

In 1907 the property was hit by a severe storm and recorded 3 inches (76 mm) of rain in a short period of time. The homestead was damaged by strong winds and several windmills were blown over.

During the shearing season of 1918 a total of 15,500 sheep, including 3,000 lambs, were shorn, producing a total of 300 bales of wool.

A flock of 15,936 sheep and 5,208 lambs were shorn in 1923 producing 525 bales of wool.

== See also ==
- List of pastoral leases in Western Australia
