= Rocklea Station =

Pastoral lease in Western Australia

Coordinates: 22.887°S 117.448°E

Location in Western Australia

Rocklea Station, often referred to as Rocklea, is a pastoral lease that once operated as a sheep station but now operates as a cattle station.

It is located about 41 kilometres (25 mi) south west of Tom Price and 42 kilometres (26 mi) north west of Paraburdoo in the Pilbara region of Western Australia.

Rocklea occupies an area of 1,849 square kilometres (714 sq mi) and shares boundaries with Turee Creek Station, Ashburton Downs, Mininer and Wyloo Stations as well as vacant crown land. The property is divided by a line of basalt hills, including Mount Jope, that splits it into a northern and southern half. Otherwise the station is composed of broad sandy and clayey plains.

Established prior to 1911, the property was producing wool in that year. In 1925 Rocklea was owned by Smith and Smith. In 1949 Oscar Leonard Smith died in his sleep at a well on the property.

The property changed from grazing sheep to cattle in the 1960s.

In 1979 Rocklea was running a herd of 1,200 head of cattle, and is estimated to be able to run 2,660 head in a good season.

The mining company Hamersley Iron, a part of Rio Tinto, currently own Rocklea. Rio Tinto own another five stations in the Pilbara, including Yarraloola, Hamersley and Juna. Collectively the properties run a herd of approximately 24,000 cattle.

== See also ==
- List of ranches and stations
