= Mundabullangana, Western Australia =

Pastoral lease in Western Australia

Mundabullangana
- Location within Western Australia

General information
- Type: Station
- Location: 100 km south-west of Port Hedland, Pilbara, Western Australia
- Coordinates: 20°31′10″S 118°03′34″E

Western Australia Heritage Register
- Designated: 16 May 2008
- Reference no.: 4004

Mundabullangana is a settlement in Western Australia, located approximately 100 km south-west of Port Hedland. It is the site of a 225,000-hectare cattle station. Mundabullangana is more commonly known as Munda Station.

In 1872, brothers Roderick Louden Mackay and Donald McDonald Mackay, then their younger brother Donald Mackay and his son, Samuel Peter Mackay, took up a tract of country on the Yule River, where there was a good pool of permanent water, bearing the Aboriginal name Mundabullangana. Although for most of its history Mundabullangana was predominantly a sheep station, in 1985, long after it passed out of the Mackay family, it was destocked in favour of cattle.

The station originally occupied an area of 1,000,000 acres (4,047 km^{2}) and by 1903, following the death of his father, Samuel Mackay became the sole owner of the station.

With its lease taken up in the 1870s, Mundabullangana Station is significant as the first pastoral lease taken up by European settlers in the Yule and Turner River areas of Western Australia. It became one of the largest and most successful enterprises of its kind in the nineteenth and early twentieth centuries, and its pastoral use continued through the twentieth century, and into the twenty-first century.

In 1898, the station recorded 10 inches (254 mm) of rain following a cyclone in the area. The Aboriginal workers on the station said the Yule River ran higher than ever before as a result of the deluge.

In 1925, the property was sold by the Mackay estate for £87,000, when it occupied an area of 511,807 acres (207,121 ha) and was stocked with 35,000 sheep and 190 horses. It was acquired by the Craig brothers, who also owned Portree, Yalbago, Wandina and Maroonah Stations.

The homestead at Mundabullangana Station is a good example of Victorian Georgian style architecture. On 2 March 1984, Mundabullangana homestead was entered on the Register of the National Estate. The nomination lapsed, and it was removed from the Register on 14 May 1991.

The lessee in 2015 was Michael Thompson, who also grazes his cattle on neighbouring Boodarie Station. Following a series of incidents of poaching and arson in 2015, costing Thompson $100,000, he closed the gates to Mundabullangana and employed guards to keep the public out.

== See also ==
- List of pastoral leases in Western Australia
