= Wyloo =

Pastoral lease in Western Australia

Coordinates: 22.69°S 116.233°E

Location in Western Australia

Wyloo Station, often referred to as Wyloo and previously known as Peake, is a pastoral lease that operates as a sheep station and cattle station.

It is located about 116 kilometres (72 mi) south of Pannawonica and 158 kilometres (98 mi) west of Paraburdoo in the Pilbara region of Western Australia.

Wyloo occupies an area of 3,280 square kilometres (1,266 sq mi) and shares boundaries with Ashburton Downs, Kooline, Mount Stuart, Rocklea and Glenflorrie Stations.

Peake Station was established prior to 1897 and was trading in sheep at that time. The station was owned by the McGrath family in 1907 when the area received good rains following a cyclone hitting the coast.

The Wyloo Pastoral Company was established in 1927 when the company was registered with £10,000 of capital raised on 10,000 shares. The company acquired the 548,312-acre (221,894 ha) property known as Peake Station later the same year. Peake was renamed shortly afterwards to Wyloo. George Monger was appointed manager of Wyloo and Hardey Junction Station the following year, following substantial improvements. Mervyn Forrest was a part owner of both Wyloo and Minderoo Stations in 1928.

A new shearing shed was built in 1935 at Loghut, an outstation of Wyloo; the 12-stand shed put through a total of 29,000 sheep during shearing that year. In 1936 a total of 20,770 sheep were shorn after a dry season.

In 1946 Wyloo was put up for auction; at the time it occupied an area of 783,805 acres (317,195 ha) and was divided into 34 paddocks with 450 miles (724 km) of fencing. About 550,000 acres (222,577 ha) was fenced for sheep with the remainder for cattle. Stock were watered by several permanent and semi-permanent waterholes along with 30 wells and 25 bores. The station had a stone homestead, men's quarters, two drafting yards and two shearing sheds. It was advertised as being capable of carrying 30,000 sheep and 2,000 cattle, but after a long drought was only carrying 2,000 sheep and 1,000 cattle.

Drought conditions were experienced through the area in 1954, including one day where a temperature of 125 °F (52 °C) was recorded at Wyloo.

Wyloo has been owned by the Pensini family since 1976, but the western half of the property was sold off in early 2001. The eastern half of the property, now called Cheela Plains, is a cattle station run by Evan Pensini.

== See also ==
- List of ranches and stations
