= Kalli Station (pastoral lease) =

Pastoral lease in Western Australia

Coordinates: 26°53′30.42″S 117°07′21.79″E

Location in Western Australia

Kalli Station is a pastoral lease that has operated as both a cattle and sheep station in Western Australia.

== Description ==
The property covers an area of 85,322 hectares (210,835 acres) and has traditionally farmed sheep for the production of wool. The station is located in the Shire of Murchison in the Mid West region of Western Australia; the nearest town is Cue. The soil has a low level of erosion, with 91% of the land being described as nil or minor. The perennial vegetation condition is poor, with 47% of vegetation cover being described as poor or very poor. Kalli adjoins Boolardy, Meka, Mileura and Madoonga Stations.

== History ==
The station was put on the market in 1918 by John Patrick McGrath. McGrath had previously owned the Peake and left to establish Kalli Station. In 1918 the station covered an area of 213,750 acres (86,502 ha). The property eventually sold to Ted Church in 1920 and later sold again to John Forrest in 1927.

304 wethers were sold off from the station in 1926.

Three trucks of cattle were sold and moved from the station via Day Dawn to Midland Junction in 1928.

The area was struck by drought in 1936–1937 when the station was owned by Mr A. Lloyd who said "if it had not been for mulga cutting he would have no sheep left at all"; the rains came in April 1937, allowing stock to be turned out.

The property was put on the market in 1948 as part of the estate of E. J. Church, along with the flock of over 5,200 sheep.

In 1989, an inspector from the Department of Agriculture stumbled across a large cannabis crop at Kalli Station. Following a police investigation, Operation Cerberus, another crop was found at Gingin and another was planned to be planted at Mount Elvire by the L'Onorata Syndicate. As a result, ten men were arrested including Rocco Versace and Sebastino Pizzata, who were the ringleaders. The head of the operation Bruno "The Fox" Romeo was arrested years later.

The CSIRO regional land classification system uses the name taken from the station to describe plains of red sand over laterite.

The current lessees are Ross and Ailsa Ariti. Kalli is operating under the Crown Lease number CL574-1966 and has the Land Act number LA3114/670.

== See also ==
- List of ranches and stations
- List of pastoral leases in Western Australia
