= Bexley Station (Queensland) =

Pastoral lease in Queensland

Coordinates: 23.19548°S 144.32495°E

Location in Queensland

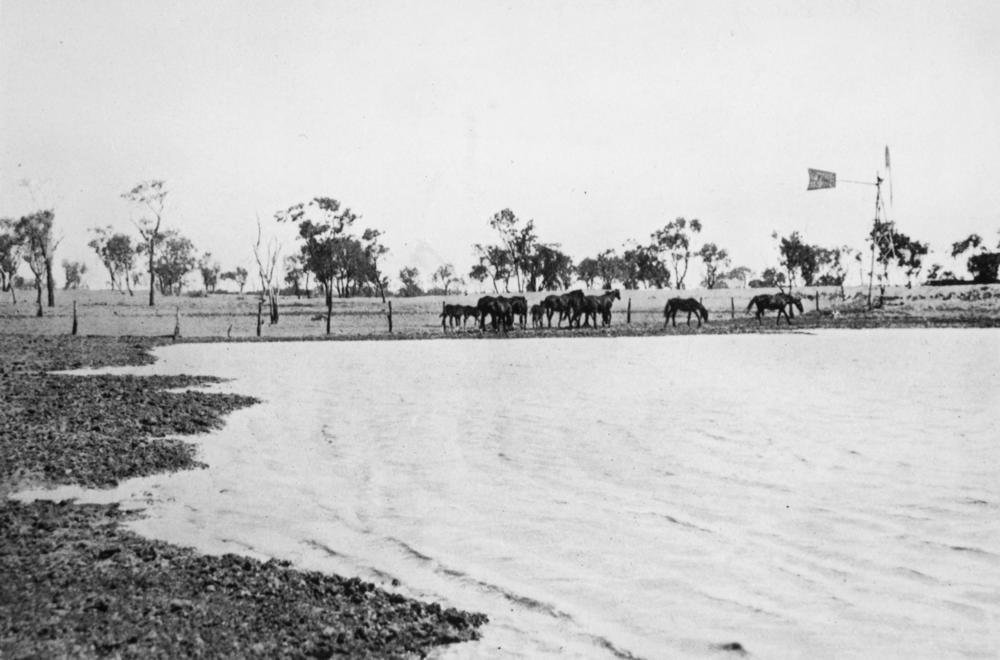
Thoroughbred horses on Bexley Station ca. 1913

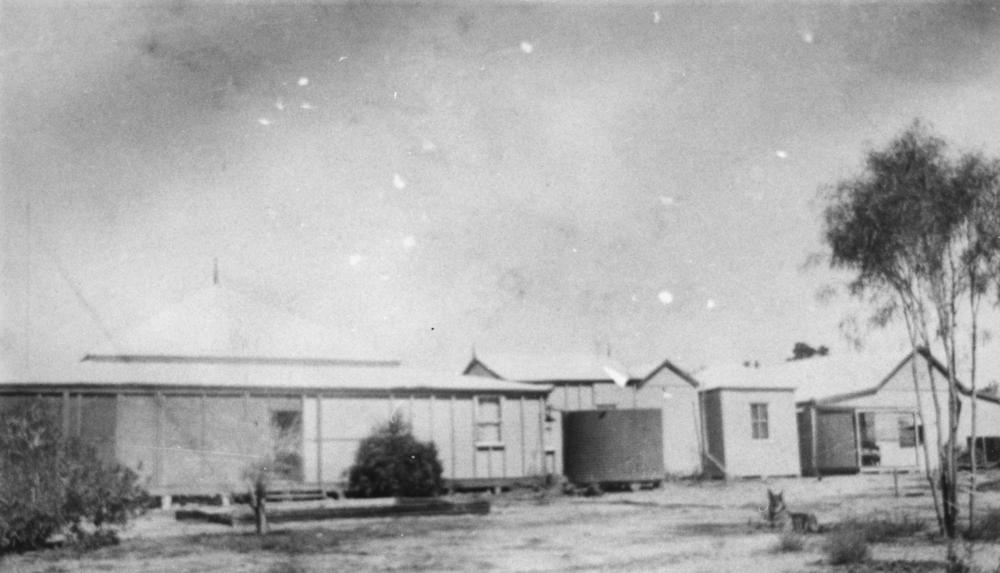
Section of the Bexley homestead buildings, ca. 1926

Bexley Station is a pastoral lease that operates as a sheep station in Queensland.

The property is situated approximately 29 kilometres (18 mi) north of Longreach and 70 kilometres (43 mi) south of Muttaburra.

Established at some time prior to 1890 by Edward Goddard Blume, the paddocks were burnt out the same year with the loss of most feed and some fencing. The property was stocked with sheep, producing 68 bales of wool in 1892 and 71 in 1893.

Blume sold Bexley in 1939 to T. Scanlan. Blume sold the 39,800 acres (16,106 ha) completely unstocked but retained the 44,215 acres (17,893 ha) Yanburra portion of the property for himself.

The area was flooded in 1950 and then a plague of snakes with 27 snakes being found in the homestead. In 1953 the property was owned by W. G. Allen and his wife and two sons.

The property, owned by the McPherson family, was deluged during a storm in 2001 when a total of 200 millimetres (8 in) of rain fell during a single storm that lasted nearly 24 hours.

In 2011 the property was still owned by Ross and Michelle McPherson.

== See also ==
- List of ranches and stations
