= Munduney =

Pastoral lease in South Australia

Coordinates: 33.46084°S 138.69311°E

Location in South Australia

Munduney Station is a pastoral lease that operates as a sheep station in South Australia.

It is situated approximately 9 kilometres (6 mi) north east of Spalding and 20 kilometres (12 mi) west of Hallett.

The station was established some time prior to 1884, when it was already producing wool for London markets. John Davies owned the station in 1902. By 1912 the property was carrying a flock of 16,000 sheep.

The University of Adelaide sold the property in 2011 for approximately A$20 million. The property at this time consisted of 7,513 hectares (18,565 acres). It had been bequeathed to the university and Prince Alfred College by the estate of J.S. Davies. The sale included all plant and equipment along with the 11,000 sheep the property was stocked with. The property also had 4,000 hectares (9,884 acres) of planted crops and 18 wind turbines that would supply revenue until 2033.

== See also ==
- List of ranches and stations
