= Barnong Station =

Pastoral lease in Western Australia

Coordinates: 28.6327°S 116.2808°E

Location in Western Australia

Barnong Station is a pastoral lease that operates as a sheep station in Western Australia.

It is located approximately 70 kilometres (43 mi) north east of Morawa and 76 km (47 mi) south east of Mullewa in the Mid West region of Western Australia.

The station is an amalgamation of a number of smaller leases that were established in the 1870s. From 1872 Michael Morrissey had commenced acquiring several of the small leases, combining them into one property that became Barnong.

In 1886 a lease known as Meru and Barnong was advertised for sale. The lease, which occupied an area of 40,000 acres (16,187 ha), had four wells and several semi-permanent pools to water stock.

The heritage listed homestead was constructed in the 1890s; the complex consists of the main house, the kitchen and dining rooms, staff quarters and shearing shed. The original house has two rooms with pug walls that have concrete render on the outside to window sill height. The new part of the house is built from stone that was quarried a short distance away.

Wainwright and Company held the lease to Barnong, Gabyon and Pindathirna Stations in 1898 when the area had a good year's rain with pools filled to overflowing and good feed available to stock.

In 2000 Judy Mitchell published the book The First Hundred Years: The Mitchell Family on Barnong Station, detailing the story of the family's time at Barnong.

== See also ==
- List of ranches and stations
- List of pastoral leases in Western Australia
