= Bloods Creek Station =

Pastoral lease and cattle station in South Australia

Coordinates: 26.2715°S 134.9285°E

Location in South Australia

Bloods Creek Station is a defunct pastoral lease that once operated as a sheep station and a cattle station in the Far North of South Australia.

The property is situated approximately 150 kilometres (93 mi) north of Oodnadatta and 169 kilometres (105 mi) east of Kulgera.

The traditional owners of the area are the Arrernte people, who remained on the property after the 1920s.

The lease takes its name from Bloods Creek, which has some semi-permanent waterholes. The Overland Telegraph passed near one of the waterholes.

In 1901 the state government drilled a 2,002 feet (610 m) bore and a large windmill was built to reach the hot sub-artesian water, which rose to within 140 feet (43 m) of the surface. The property was also once an important railhead for the original Ghan railway.

In 1905 the leaseholder was John Bailes, who had introduced Angora goats to the property.

The lease was taken up by Ted Colson, the first white man to cross the Simpson Desert, in 1931. Colson ran sheep, tended the bore and ran a store. Later the lease was amalgamated into the Dalhousie pastoral company, along with Federal, Mount Dare and Dalhousie Springs leases by Edwin Lowe.

== See also ==
- List of ranches and stations
