= Springvale Station =

Pastoral lease in Western Australia

Coordinates: 17.784737°S 127.6849988°E

Location in Western Australia

Springvale or Springvale Station is a pastoral lease that operates as a cattle station in the East Kimberley region of Western Australia. The Springvale Aggregation was created when Springvale was purchased along with Alice Downs, Mabel Downs, and Texas Downs by a South African company in 2003. As of March 2022 the four properties are owned by Harvest Road, an agribusiness owned by Andrew Forrest.

Springvale Station is situated about 48 kilometres (30 mi) north of Halls Creek and 84 kilometres (52 mi) south west of Warmun in the Kimberley region. The cluster of stations known as Springvale Aggregation covers 604,430 ha (1,493,600 acres).

== History ==
J. W. McAdam acquired Springvale in 1932 from E. Bridge and Sons.

The family business Quilty and Sons expanding their already vast ownership in the region, acquired Springvale in 1948 from W. J. McAdam in 1948. The Quilty’s already owned neighbouring Bedford Downs Station.

In 2003 the 1,344-square-kilometre (519 sq mi) property was sold as part of a A$15-million four-property deal to South African interests. The four adjoining stations of Springvale, Bedford Downs, Mabel Downs and Alice Downs comprised an area of 5,850 square kilometres (2,259 sq mi) and were stocked with approximately 32,000 head of cattle.

== Today ==
In March 2022, Andrew Forrest's agribusiness, Harvest Road, bought the station, along with Mabel Downs, Alice Downs and Texas Downs, together known as the Springvale Aggregation. Together they cover 604,430 ha (1,493,600 acres) and are stocked with 35,000 head of cattle. Traditional owners of the land were keen to work with the new owners, hoping for some of the land to be developed as tourist destinations, which would create jobs for Indigenous people in a region which has few opportunities. In addition, with Forrest's known interest in improving the lives of Indigenous peoples, it is hoped that his wealth could be used to improve educational outcomes for children in the Halls Creek area.

== See also ==
- List of ranches and stations
