= Boodarie Station =

Pastoral lease in Western Australia

Coordinates: 20.4069°S 118.4714°E

Location in Western Australia

Boodarie Station is a pastoral lease that was once a sheep station but now operates as a cattle station in Western Australia.

It is located approximately 20 kilometres (12 mi) south west of Port Hedland and 130 km (81 mi) north east of Karratha on the Turner River in the Pilbara region of Western Australia.

Fred Arunder and Charlie Upton initially took up the Boodarie lease circa 1880. A homestead was also constructed prior to 1880, but a more substantial building was completed circa 1910.

The property was exporting wool by sea in 1888, with the natural harbour and landing being regarded as a good place to land cargo.

The property is currently owned by BHP. The company was leasing out the land to Michael Thompson of neighbouring Mundabullangana Station in 2015 to graze his cattle on. Following a series of incidents of poaching and arson in 2015 costing Thompson $100,000, he closed the gates to Mundabullangana and employed guards to keep the public out.

== See also ==
- List of ranches and stations
- List of pastoral leases in Western Australia
