= Mount Elvire Station =

Pastoral lease in Western Australia

Coordinates: 29°22′0″S 119°36′0″E

Location in Western Australia

Mount Elvire Station was a pastoral lease and sheep station located approximately 177 kilometres (110 mi) south west of Leonora in the Goldfields-Esperance region of Western Australia.

The explorer John Forrest passed through the area in 1869. Travelling in the area to the north of Mount Elvire, which he named after his wife, he named the nearby Lake Barlee after the Colonial Secretary of Western Australia. The station encompasses a large peninsula of Lake Barlee at its northern boundary.

Malcolm Campbell Ross, of Menzies, took up the lease on the station in 1966 but it was never fully stocked or developed. The owners from 1973-77 were the McLaughlin family, who ran 3,500 head of sheep on the lease.

In 1989, an inspector from the Department of Agriculture stumbled across a large cannabis crop at Kalli Station, another sheep station in the Mid West near Cue. Following a police investigation, Operation Cerberus, another crop was found at Gingin and another was planned to be planted at Mount Elvire by the L'Onorata syndicate. As a result, ten men were arrested, including the ringleaders Rocco Versace and Sebastino Pizzata. The head of the operation Bruno "The Fox" Romeo was arrested years later.

The pastoral lease was acquired by the Department of Environment and Conservation in 1991 and is now used as a tourist destination, offering overnight stays on the site.

In 2006, the Department of Environment and Conservation proposed that the 1,543-square-kilometre (596 sq mi) station be converted to the Mount Elvire Conservation Park as part of the larger Mount Manning Nature Reserve.

== See also ==
- List of ranches and stations
