= Mary Jane Warnes =

Australian activist

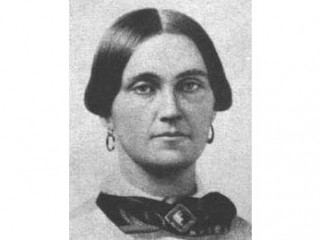
- Born: 18 July 1877
- Died: 19 June 1959 (aged 81)
- Resting place: Burra
- Occupation: Community worker

Mary Jane Fairbrother MBE, known as Mary Jane Warnes (18 July 1877 – 19 June 1959) was an Australian activist who in 1926 established the first South Australian branch of the Country Women's Association (CWA).

== Early life and education ==
Fairbrother was born in Fullarton, an inner suburb of Adelaide, South Australia, the youngest daughter of Thomas Fairbrother, a gardener, and Jane Mears (née Clarke). She was of English descent. She received her education at Misses Newman's private school in Parkside.

== Career ==
On 12 February 1900, Fairbrother married Isaac James Warnes (1871-1944) at St Augustine's Church in Unley. The couple lived in isolation at Koomooloo in the northeast of South Australia state, though she occasionally made a 129 kilometres (80 mi) trip by horse and cart to Burra to shop and converse with other women.

By the mid 1920s, Warnes was living in Wahroonga, roughly 12 miles (19 km) from Burra. In 1926, she attended an informal conference held by the National Council of Women in Adelaide. Inspired by the meeting, upon her return she formed the Burra Women's Service Association with women representatives from 11 local districts in November. It became the first South Australian branch of the Country Women's Association (CWA), which formed that year, with Warnes becoming President of the Burra branch. She took an active role in the running of the CWA from the outset, and was influential in the establishment of the metropolitan branch of the group in Adelaide.

Warnes's active work led to her appointment as the State President of the CWA in 1929, a position which she held until 1941. In 1929, she was a delegate to the Rural Women’s Conference in London. The following year, Register wrote of her: "Hers is often the guiding hand that steers a smooth path for women on whom the burdens of drought and bad seasons have weighed too heavily". In 1934 she began broadcasting on the radio, and in 1936 she was made an MBE for her services to women issues.

Warnes also presided over the women's branch of the Liberal Federation, and also served with the National Council of Women of South Australia and the League of Nations Union.

== Legacy ==
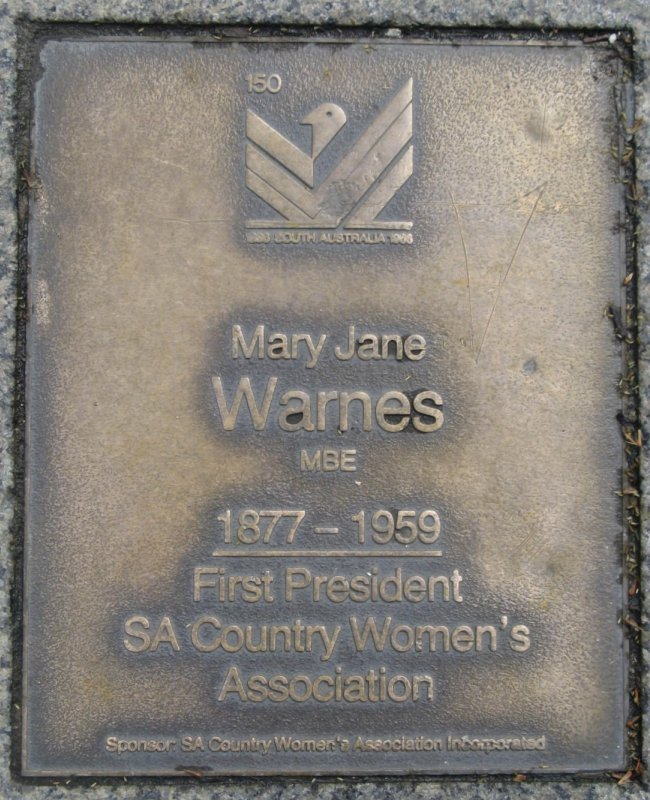
Jubilee 150 Walkway Plaque commemorating Mary Jane Warnes

Warnes died in 1959 and was buried at Burra Cemetery.

There are memorials dedicated to her at St. Mary's Church, Burra, the Jubilee 150 Walkway on North Terrace, Adelaide, the National Pioneer Women’s Hall of Fame in Alice Springs and the C.W.A. complex in Kent Town, Adelaide.
