= Canobie Station =

Cattle station in Queensland, Australia

Coordinates: 19.4763°S 140.93201°E

Location in Queensland

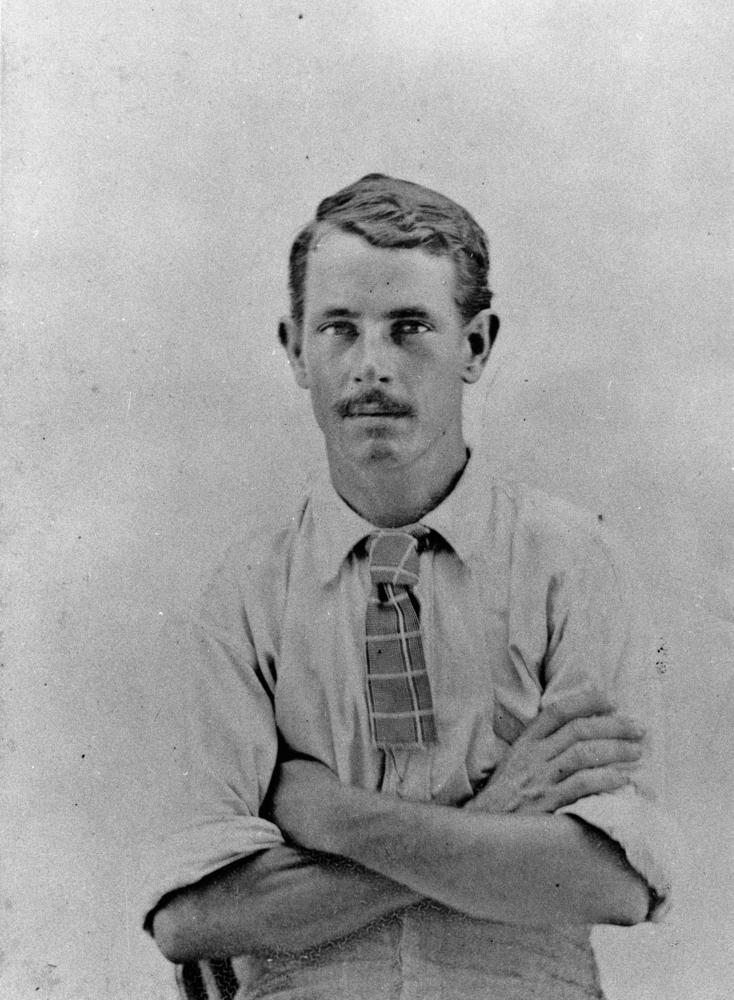
Canobie employee, F. Gordon in 1895

Canobie Station, often just referred to as Canobie, is a pastoral lease that operates as a cattle station. It is located about 143 kilometres (89 mi) north of Cloncurry and 198 kilometres (123 mi) south west of Croydon in Queensland.

The property occupies an area of 4,291 square kilometres (1,657 sq mi) of Queensland's Gulf Country and is able to carry a herd of approximately 35,000 gulf-composite cattle. It is currently owned by the Australian Agricultural Company. The area is made up of black soil plains like much of the Gulf Country; the Georgina basement rocks are overlaid with sediments of the Carpentaria basin. The Cloncurry River and many of its smaller tributaries are situated within the boundaries of the property and make excellent watering points for the stock.

The station takes its name from a corruption of the traditional owners' name of the locale: Conobie.

The station was first established in 1864 when Edward Palmer, originally from Wollongong, stocked the property with cattle and sheep. The first wool was taken off Canobie in 1865 to Burketown. Palmer's partner, Mr Shrewing, died of gulf fever in the first year and the station was drought-stricken for the first few years then flooded in 1869–1870.

Palmer was of the view that British colonisers like him had "a peculiar mission to supplant" the Aboriginal Australians and to "occupy the country that was wholly theirs". Palmer confirmed that Indigenous people were commonly shot and were "a hard-used race", but he thought that "the troublesome question" of finding a "solution" for the "blacks" was that "we have to occupy the country and no two races can inhabit the same country but the weaker must go to the wall".

In the 1880s, a new partner, Mr Stephenson, bought into Canobie with Palmer. In 1895, the head station homestead was burnt to the ground with only a few books being saved.

The whole area was severely flooded in 1891 with Palmer being trapped in Normanton and unable to return to the property. Surrounding properties recorded water levels as rising over 12 feet (4 m), causing widespread destruction and the loss of hundreds of stock.

The property was sold in 1908 to A.J. Cotton along with all of its stock: 23,000 head of cattle and 451 horses.

In 1912, Canobie West Station, presumably resumed from Canobie, having a total area of 294,400 acres (460 sq mi), was sold with five other properties to the New Zealand and Australian Land Co. Ltd.

A Qantas plane on a mail run was destroyed by fire at Canobie in 1948. The plane, a Dragon Rapide, landed at the property on schedule but when it was restarted for take-off an engine burst into flames, which soon engulfed the entire aircraft.

In the 1970s, the shorthorn herd was replaced with the better suited Brahman cattle, which thrived in the tropical conditions. AACo acquired Canobie in 1985 along with neighbouring Alcalá station and the two were combined, forming a single operation. In 1990, Lyrian Downs, on the eastern boundary, was added to the conglomerate.

Both Canobie and nearby Wondoola Station are being explored for nickel deposits by a joint partnership between Anglo American and Falcon minerals. The development is known as the Saxby project and further drilling was to occur in 2009.

== See also ==
- List of ranches and stations
- List of the largest stations in Australia
