= Dunlop Station (pastoral run) =

Pastoral lease in New South Wales

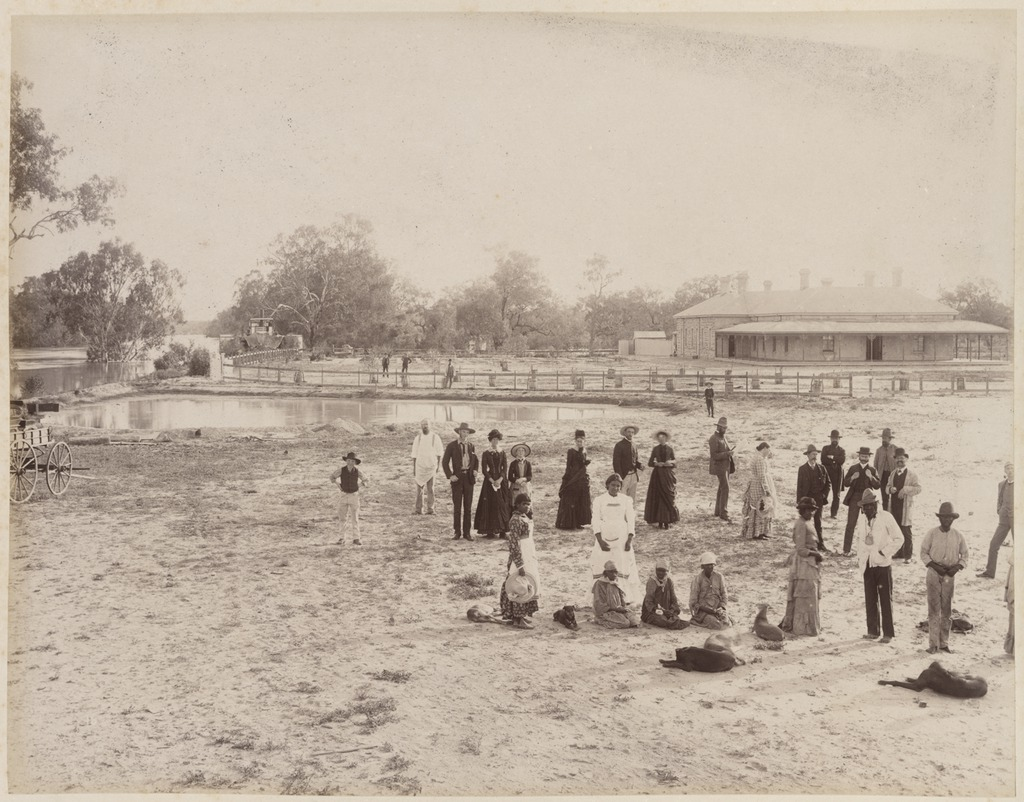
People gathered at the Dunlop Station homestead, 1886

The Dunlop Station was a pastoral lease that operated as a sheep station in New South Wales. Dunlop is significant as farm with the first mechanised shearing of sheep.

The property is situated west of Bourke, New South Wales near the village of Louth, New South Wales and is located on the opposite bank of the Darling River from Toorale Station.

In 1880 Samuel Wilson (pastoralist) sold Dunlop and Toorale Stations to Samuel McCaughey. In 1888 the first mechanised shearing of sheep, in the world, took place at Sir Samuel McCaughey's Dunlop Station.

== See also ==
- Dunlop railway station
- List of ranches and stations
