= Tickalara =

Pastoral lease in south west Queensland, Australia

Coordinates: 28.621°S 142.21°E

Location in Queensland

Tickalara Station, most commonly known as Tickalara, is a pastoral lease that operates as a cattle station in south west Queensland.

It is situated about 92 kilometres (57 mi) north of Tibooburra and 172 kilometres (107 mi) south east of Innamincka.

The Fitzgerald brothers owned the station from 1887 to 1897 and lost about £100,000 over those 10 years.

== History ==
Tickalara received 10 inches (254 mm) of rain over a few days in 1890 and the surrounding country was submerged for miles around. The property was stocked with about 50,000 sheep in 1894.

Sackville and Sidney Kidman acquired Tickalara in late 1897 for £10,000 from the Fitzgerald brothers. The Kidmans also acquired many other stations in the channel country at about the same time including Annandale and Alton Downs Station. At this time the station occupied an area of 700 square miles (1,813 km^{2}) and was stocked with 22,000 sheep, 600 cattle and 600 horses.

Following a drought in Western Australia and South Australia in 1914, Kidman offered farmers agistment for their horses at Tickalara for 500 head until conditions improved.

== See also ==
- List of ranches and stations
