= Talia Station =

Pastoral lease in South Australia

Coordinates: 33.313°S 134.878°E

Location in South Australia

Talia Station is a pastoral lease that operates as a sheep station in South Australia.

It is situated about 37 kilometres (23 mi) north of Elliston and 62 kilometres (39 mi) south west of Wudinna on the Eyre Peninsula.

The name of the station is derived from the Aboriginal word meaning near water.

The run was originally owned by J. T. Symes in 1856 but was named by John Harris Browne who acquired the property shortly afterwards. By 1865 the property was being managed by John Strange and Mary Irvan Dinnison but the property was still owned by Browne.

Archibald Graham Thompson and his brother William acquired Talia and Calea Stations from Browne in about 1880. William died in 1884 leaving Archibald with sole ownership of both properties. In 1888, Talia occupied an area of 65 square miles (168 km^{2}) when Thompson renewed the lease on the property. In 1907 he sold 4,000 acres (1,619 ha) from the lease. Archibald retired in 1912 leaving Talia to his three son, and died in Adelaide in 1919.

== See also ==
- List of ranches and stations
