= Old Koomooloo =

Pastoral lease in South Australia

- Town
- Interactive map of Old Koomooloo
- Coordinates: 33.565555°S 139.70662°E
- Country: Australia
- State: South Australia
- LGA: Pastoral Unincorporated Area
- Location: 65 km (40 mi) north of Morgan; 93 km (58 mi) east of Burra
- Established: 1868

Government
  - State electorate: Chaffey
  - Federal division: Grey
- Postcode: 5417
Localities around Old Koomooloo
	Sturt Vale
Warnes	Old Koomooloo	Canegrass
	Balah

Old Koomooloo is a pastoral lease in the Murray and Mallee region of South Australia that operates as a sheep station.

It was established by Thomas Warnes in 1868. He called it "Koomooloo", but then in 1892, he built a new and larger station nearby, which he also called "Koomooloo", leading to the older station being known as "Old Koomooloo". The origin of the name 'Koomooloo' is unknown.

Old Koomooloo is connected with the foundation of the South Australian Country Women's Association. Thomas Warnes' sons took over Koomooloo and Old Koomooloo, and their respective wives Mary (from Koomooloo) and Deborah (from Old Koomooloo) would ride bicycles along bush tracks to meet for tea in the scrub. It was this habit that inspired Mary Warnes eventually to establish the South Australian Country Women's Association.

The station was at one point thriving, even leading to the establishment in 1910 of the Old Koomooloo, Woolgangi and Sturt Vale Athletics Club.

For many years, Old Koomooloo was owned by Isaac Warnes. By the 1940s, it was owned by Tom Warnes. The station caused headlines in 1947, when Tom Warnes' daughter Christobel was lost at the station. After 30 hours, during which time large numbers of volunteers came from Burra in order to help search for her, and the police brought two Aboriginal trackers from Berri, she was found unharmed.

Old Koomooloo is now owned by the Thomas family.
