= Trinchera Ranch =

Ranch in Colorado

Trinchera Ranch (Blanca, Forbes Trinchera Ranch) is a historic private ranch located in the San Luis Valley of Southern Colorado, at the base of the Sangre de Cristo Mountains, near the Great Sand Dunes National Park and Preserve. Covering approximately 172,000 acres, Trinchera Ranch is the largest private ranch in Colorado. The ranch has been closely tied to the region's development, agricultural practices, and, more recently, conservation efforts. The Trinchera ranch is home to several of Colorado's fourteeners, including Mount Lindsey, Blanca Peak, and Little Bear Peak.

== History ==
=== Spanish land grant origins ===
The origins of Trinchera Ranch date back to the early 19th century when it was part of a large Spanish land grant known as the Sangre de Cristo Land Grant. The grant was issued in 1843 by the Mexican government to Narciso Beaubien, whose father was Charles Beaubien, and Stephen Luis Lee, and it was intended to encourage settlement and development in the sparsely populated region of what is now southern Colorado. After the Mexican–American War, the Treaty of Guadalupe Hidalgo (1848) confirmed the grant under U.S. law.

The Sangre de Cristo Land Grant was one of many such grants in the American Southwest, reflecting the Mexican government's policy of awarding large tracts of land to individuals to promote settlement and development. These grants often covered hundreds of thousands of acres, and the recipients were expected to establish settlements, ranches, and agricultural operations on the land.

In 1863, the Sangre de Cristo Land Grant was sold to William Gilpin, the first governor of the Colorado Territory, who saw the potential for large-scale ranching and agriculture in the region. Gilpin divided the grant into smaller parcels, which were eventually sold to different owners. A portion of the original grant became what is now the Trinchera Ranch.

=== Early ranching and agricultural use ===
Throughout the late 19th and early 20th centuries, Trinchera Ranch was primarily used for cattle ranching and agriculture. The vast size of the ranch, combined with its diverse landscapes, made it ideal for these purposes. The ranch's lands include expansive forests, alpine meadows, wetlands, and high desert, providing a variety of environments for livestock grazing and farming.

The ranch's location in the San Luis Valley, one of the largest high-altitude valleys in the world, also made it significant for water resources. The valley is fed by snowmelt from the Sangre de Cristo Mountains, creating streams and rivers that flow through the ranch, which have been crucial for irrigation and maintaining livestock.

=== Ownership by Malcolm Forbes ===
The ranch gained national attention in the 1960s when it was purchased by Malcolm Forbes, the publisher of Forbes magazine. Forbes purchased two sections of the original land grant, one called the Trinchera Ranch and the other the Blanca Ranch. Forbes expanded the ranch's operations and used it as a retreat. The ranch became well known during this period for its size, natural beauty, and the high-profile visitors it attracted. Due to political disputes over fencing part of the ranch, Malcom Forbes began to subdivide the northern part of the ranch and sell small acreage parcels, today what is known as Forbes Park.

=== Acquisition by Louis Bacon and conservation efforts ===
In 2007, Trinchera Ranch was sold to Louis Bacon, a hedge fund manager and noted conservationist. Bacon, who had a strong interest in land preservation, viewed the acquisition as an opportunity to protect the ranch's natural environment and to promote sustainable land management practices.

In 2012, Bacon donated a conservation easement on 90,000 acres of the ranch to the U.S. Fish and Wildlife Service. This easement, developed by the ranch's environmental manager Craig Taggart MLA, is one of the largest of its kind in U.S. history and guarantees that the land will remain undeveloped, preserving critical wildlife habitat and maintaining the ranch's ecological integrity.

The conservation easement was part of Bacon's broader commitment to environmental stewardship, similar environmental protections have been placed on his other property holdings, including the 25,000 acre Tercio Ranch, also in Colorado which is known for its innovative fire mitigation program and environmentally sound coal bed methane fields both developed by environmental manager Craig Taggart. The easement was designed to protect the habitats of a variety of species, including elk, deer, black bears, mountain lions, and the native Rio Grande Cutthroat Trout.The streams and rivers that traverse the ranch provide crucial habitats for this native trout species, which has become increasingly rare in the region. Efforts to maintain and restore these aquatic environments are integral to the ranch's conservation strategies.

Hunting activities on Trinchera Ranch are tightly regulated to ensure the sustainable management of wildlife populations. The ranch is home to thriving populations of elk, mule deer, and other game species, making it a destination for hunters seeking a managed and ecologically responsible hunting experience. Revenue from hunting permits contributes to the ongoing conservation and management of the ranch. Forestry operations including the development of the Blanca Sawmill is another way the ranch works to conserve the land through active land management while producing revenue.

=== Wildfires and fire mitigation efforts ===
Trinchera Ranch has not been immune to the threat of wildfire, a common issue in Colorado's forested regions. Several wildfires, including the Spring Creek Fire (2018), have impacted the ranch over the years, necessitating significant reforestation and fire mitigation efforts.

Louis Bacon has invested heavily in fire mitigation efforts. Fire mitigation strategies include thinning overgrown areas, creating defensible space around structures, and developing firebreak to slow the spread of potential fires. Additionally, reforestation projects have been undertaken to restore areas damaged by past fires, with a focus on planting native tree species that are more resistant to fire and other environmental stressors.

== Current status ==
In 2015, Louis Bacon received the Audubon Medal for conservation and environmental protection. The ranch continues to operate as a working ranch, with sustainable cattle grazing and agriculture, while also serving as a protected area that supports biodiversity.
