= Conaway Ranch =

Ranch in Yolo County, California, US

Coordinates: 38.6475°N 121.6665°W

Conaway Ranch is a 17,300-acre (70 km^{2}) ranch in Yolo County, California. The vast property is located between the cities of Woodland, Davis, and West Sacramento in a triangle formed by State Route 113, Interstate 5, and Interstate 80.

== Background ==
Conaway Ranch is a 17,244-acre (70 km^{2}) property that sits to the east of both Davis and Woodland and west of Sacramento. Two-thirds of the property sits in the Yolo Bypass (the 'causeway'), the sink of Cache Creek, or the Green Zone between County Road 27 and County Road 29. Most of the ranch is currently protected by Williamson Act contracts. All of the land is zoned for agriculture or agriculture preserve and is leased to more than 40 farmers and various waterfowl and hunting groups. Also, there are three different 500 acre (2 km^{2}) wetlands on the ranch.

Prior to 2001 the property was owned by a subsidiary of PG&E, called PG&E Properties. When PG&E Properties went bankrupt, it was acquired by National Energy and Gas Transmission, NEGT. In 2004, the Yolo County Board of Supervisors announced plans to acquire Conaway Ranch from NEGT, which itself was now bankrupt. By order of the bankruptcy court, the property had to be sold in a closed-bid auction. By state law, Yolo County could not participate in that auction. The land was purchased in that auction for about $60 million by the Conaway Preservation Group.

The Conaway Preservation Group is owned by a group of local businessmen, including Kyriakos Tsakopoulos who was named President & CEO of AKT Development Group. The land was the subject of an eminent domain action initiated by Yolo County. The ranch holds valuable water rights, among other natural resources. The county claimed that it had an interest in the land not being developed. Yolo County officials were attempting to seize the land for what they described as the public purpose of maintaining the status quo. The county claimed that it proposed transferring long-term management authority for the ranch to a Joint Powers Authority or similar consortium of entities such as Yolo County, municipalities within the county, the Yolo County Flood Control District, University of California at Davis, and possibly the Rumsey Band of Wintun Indians.

The Conaway Preservation Group opposed the action, arguing that the county did not need to condemn the ranch to fully protect the ranch's resources, which were already protected through local zoning, existing state law and local ordinances. The Conaway Preservation Group claimed it had no plans for development on the property, and made no requests to the county for any of the land to be rezoned. "The primary goal of the Conaway Preservation Group is to maintain private ownership while allowing for easements and other mechanisms to be placed on the ranch to protect the property's water resources, agricultural land, wildlife, and flood control benefits," asserted former president Steve Giardo.

The county planned to borrow all of the money for the acquisition from the Rumsey tribe. A price had not yet been determined, nor was any rate of interest publicly disclosed. The county contended that it estimated the price (which would be set by a jury) at $60 million. In September 2006 the county entered into a settlement agreement with the Conaway Preservation Group and abandoned the eminent domain action.

== Timeline ==
- 1990 — Conaway Conservancy Group, a joint venture between local landowners and PG&E Properties, Inc., buys the Ranch. The group, which includes Anthony Smernes and current owner Steve Gidaro, proposed a housing and commercial development on the property's northwest corner, next to the City of Woodland. The city government ultimately denied the plan, deciding to grow in a different direction
- 1991 — Conaway Conservancy Group sells $6.5 million worth of water to state Drought Water Bank. Yolo County Board of Supervisors, including current Supervisor Helen Thomson, vote to support water transfer on a 4–1 vote.
- December 1994 — PG&E buys interests of local landowners, including ownership share held by Steve Gidaro, John Reynen, and Anthony Smernes. Both Steve and John plan to re-purchase the property at some point in the future.
- 1996 — PG&E drops development plans, places Conaway Ranch on the market for $68.5 million. Gidaro and Reynen consider re-purchasing the property. Local elected officials discuss forming a Joint Powers Authority to secure funding to purchase Conaway. PG&E Properties pulls property off the market.
- 2001 — Property is transferred from PG&E to National Energy and Gas Transmission (NEGT) as part of PG&E restructuring during bankruptcy proceedings.
- March 2004 — NEGT announces it will sell the property. Sets up closed bidding process to sell ranch. Steve and John request bid package and begin process of putting investment group together. Local elected officials form Joint Powers Authority in an attempt to secure financing to bid for the Ranch.
- May 2004 — Yolo County supervisors decide to not participate in closed bidding process and, instead, start eminent domain proceedings to acquire property.
- July 8, 2004 — Yolo County supervisors vote 4–0 to adopt eminent domain resolution to acquire property.
- December 15, 2004 — After NEGT's bid process closes, Conaway Preservation Group, LLC, awarded ownership of Conaway Ranch. Ownership includes Steve Gidaro, John Reynen and other prominent investors/developers in Sacramento. CPG conducts outreach to County supervisors to reach compromise that would keep property in private ownership but place greater public controls on land and water.
- February 2005 — CPG offers to conduct tours of property with County supervisors. Yolo County suspends public Joint Powers Authority meetings.
- May 2005 — Yolo County officials announce ‘stringless deal’ agreement with Rumsey Band of Wintun Indians who agree to provide financing for condemnation action.
- November 30, 2005 — Yolo County Superior Court Judge Timothy Fall rules that the county can use its power of eminent domain to take the ranch, despite CPG's argument that the county did not adequately specify what it intended to do with the property.
- June 13, 2006 — A Yolo County Superior Court jury is scheduled to begin hearing evidence of how much the county will have to pay for the property. Estimates range from $50 million to more than $389 million.
- September 7, 2006 — Yolo County and Conaway Preservation Group agree to a settlement and the eminent domain action is dropped.
- December 2010 — Developer Angelo K. Tsakopoulos assumes controlling interest in Conaway Ranch through a purchase under his Tri-City Water and Farm LLC.
