= Maroonah =

Pastoral lease in Western Australia

Coordinates: 23.479008°S 115.547360°E

Location in Western Australia

Maroonah Station, often referred to as Maroonah, is a pastoral lease that operates as a sheep station.

It is located about 190 kilometres (118 mi) east of Coral Bay and 210 kilometres (130 mi) south of Onslow in the Pilbara region of Western Australia.

Maroonah occupies an area of 1,972 square kilometres (761 sq mi) and shares boundaries with Towera, Lyndon, Mangaroon, Ullawarra, Edmund and Glenflorrie Stations as well as the Barlee Range Wildlife Sanctuary. The traditional owners of the area are the Tharrkari, who currently lease and manage neighbouring Ullawarra station.

Maroonah was established in 1893 by J. H. Mansfield and began trading in wool the same year. Mansfield had previously managed Karratha and Middalya Stations before acquiring Maroonah. Following the death of Mansfield in 1907 the property was being run his wife, Annie Mansfield, and the manager of the property John Griffin.

The station was flooded in 1909 following severe weather that washed away miles of fencing. Later the same year shearing produced a clip of over 150 bales of wool from the flock of 10,000 sheep. Annie Mansfield died in 1911 and the partnership of Mansfield and Griffin was dissolved in 1912, with Maroonah being put up for auction later the same year.

At the time it occupied an area of 212,300 acres (85,915 ha) subdivided into nine paddocks with 127 miles (204 km) of fencing. It was watered by nine wells and stocked with 10,200 sheep and 70 horses. The purchaser was W. S. Finey, who hired G. F. Egan to be the station's manager. When Finey arrived he found the property in the grip of a drought and plagued by dingos. The stock was mustered and it was found that only 2,000 sheep were present.

Frank Craig, the owner of Portree and Yalbalgo Stations, acquired Maroonah in October 1913. The Craig family remained associated with the property, with Gordon Craig dying in 1951.

In 2009 the traditional owners of the area, the Thudgari people, were awarded native title of some 1,200 square kilometres (463 sq mi) in the area, including Maroonah, Glenflorrie and Mangaroon Stations. The land use agreement allows the Thudgari access to their traditional lands to hunt, gather and camp.

Maroonah, Mangaroon and Diamond Downs were on the market in 2018; the properties had a combined area of 3,070 square kilometres (1,185 sq mi) and were carrying about 5,000 head of droughtmaster cattle. The properties were listed at A$7 million.

== See also ==
- List of ranches and stations
