= Adams Ranch =

Cattle ranch in Florida, United States

Coordinates: 27.4422°N 80.5840°W

Adams Ranch, Inc. is located on 65,000 acres (26,000 ha) in the following areas of Florida: St. Lucie, Osceola and Okeechobee counties. The ranch raises the following cattle breeds: Braford, Arrab, Abeef and Argel. They also grow various citrus fruit. It is a family owned and operated corporation. The ranch has about 10,000 cows and 400 bulls.

== History ==
Adams Ranch was established in 1937 by Alto Adams; his son, Alto "Bud" Adams, Jr., has run the ranch since 1948. Adams Jr. has three sons who are also involved in the operations of the ranch: Lee Adams (Vice President), Mike Adams (President), and Robert Adams (citrus operations).

In 1947 Alto Adams, Jr. was using Hereford bulls, but soon realized that they were not suited for Southern Florida. So he started to cross-breed Brahman cattle with Hereford cattle. Eventually he found the breed he was looking for, which is today called the Braford.

Alto Adams, Jr. incorporated his special breed with the founding of the International Braford Association (IBA) in 1969, a group of Braford breeders who were recognized by the United States Department of Agriculture in 1970. The group developed the cattle in order to have a breeding stock that could endure the high heat, humidity and insects. The Braford breed has characteristics which make them especially well-suited for the Florida environment: short hair, oily hides, pigmented eyes, high fertility and particularly impressive longevity.

== Environment ==
Adams Ranch is constantly battling flood and drought through the seasons. Water can be found on the ranch every few miles. The ranch helps to preserve the rivers, swamps, marshes, prairies and wooded areas that are on its land.

The area is home to wildlife, including animals such as the bald eagle, American alligator, bobcats, crayfish, wild turkey, nine-banded armadillos, hawks, owls, herons, egrets and crested caracara.

The ranch has planted pasture grasses suited for the environment there, consisting of clovers and legumes. The diverse wildlife on the ranch is welcomed and, given the specialized nature of the Braford breed, the cattle remain largely unaffected by the other species.

In addition to his role in establishing the Adams Ranch, Alto Adams was a Justice of the Florida Supreme Court from 1941 through 1951 and was the Chief Justice from 1949 to 1951. After a period of retirement devoted to his ranch, he was persuaded to resume a position on the Florida Supreme Court from 1967 to 1968. He was the first graduate of the University of Florida College of Law to be a Florida Supreme Court Justice.
