= Land systems of Western Australia =

Land systems of Western Australia are systematic land resource concepts where the tying in of geographical, geological, and ecological data is processed to provide land planning and land management systems with sets of information that can process large areas of land in terms of agricultural and other usages.

At times land systems are not referred to directly, but used within terms of land resources and landform resources analysis and appraisal. The government departments from which reports and papers emanate include the Agricultural and Mining departments, as well as Land administration bodies.

- Ashburton River Catchment
- Karridale - Leeuwin
- Wiluna - Meekatharra

In other states and territories of Australia, surveys of the systems have covered a range of subjects related to the issue of management.

== Selected land systems ==
The reports and research use catchment systems, regions and other land management areas as a baseline.

- Ashburton
- Carnarvon Basin
- Sandstone-Yalgoo-Paynes Find area

In some cases, land system surveys are captured in map form.

- Ashburton
- North east goldfields
