= Bedford Downs Station =

Pastoral lease in Western Australia

Coordinates: 17.261°S 127.463°E

Location in Western Australia

Bedford Downs, or Bedford Downs Station, is a pastoral lease that operates as a cattle station in Western Australia.

It is situated about 84 kilometres (52 mi) west of Warmun and 109 kilometres (68 mi) north of Halls Creek in the Kimberley region.

Both the station and nearby Mount Bedford were named in 1903 after Admiral Frederick Bedford, who was the Governor of Western Australia.

Established some time prior to 1906 by the Buchanan and Gordon Brothers, the property experienced many difficulties including the spearing of cattle and isolation of the area. In two years nearly a dozen men had also been murdered by the traditional owners.

The family business, Quilty and Sons, acquired the property in 1917 from Messrs, Mather, Ross, Manning and Ralston for £34,000. The 900-square-mile (2,331 km^{2}) property was stocked with 8,500 head of cattle and 80 horses. Patrick Quilty was left to manage Bedford Downs while his brother Tom Quilty managed Euroka Springs Station in the Northern Territory.

A boundary rider named Harry Annear was murdered by Aboriginal people on the property near the Durack River in 1921. The Aboriginal artist, Paddy Bedford, was born at the property around 1922. His surname is taken from the station and the station's owner Paddy Quilty was the source of his given name.

In 1924 a massacre of Gija and Worla men occurred on the station after the men were tried for spearing a milking cow. They were fed food laced with strychnine by white station hands and then shot or clubbed to death. The bodies were subsequently burned by the local police. The series of paintings by Indigenous Australian artist Rover Thomas called Bedford Downs Killings depicts these events.

Following the death of Patrick Quilty in 1938, the family retained possession of Bedford Downs and also acquired neighbouring Springvale Station from W. J. McAdam in 1948.

Sterling Buntine acquired the property in the early 2000s then sold it in 2011 to the Paraway Pastoral Company which is owned by the Macquarie Bank.

== See also ==
- List of ranches and stations
