= Finca Los Alamos =

- Finca Los Alamos, front of the estancia
- Interactive map of the Finca Los Alamos area

General information
- Location: San Rafael, Mendoza, Argentina
- Coordinates: 34.6566°S 68.2394°W
- Year built: 1830
- Owner: Bombal family

Finca Los Alamos is a historic Argentine estancia located in San Rafael, Mendoza. The estate was built in 1830 by the Bombal family, and originally served as a frontier fort. Domingo Bombal, who served eleven terms as Governor to the Mendoza Province (between 1863–1890), owned the estate until his death in 1908.

After decades of neglect, the property was revived by Argentine writer Susana Bombal in the 1930s. Susana brought touches of Buenos Aires sophistication to the newly restored property, including colonial furniture, original manuscripts and mural paintings. She was friends with a number of bohemian artists from the 1930s-60s who made the retreat to Finca Los Alamos, 140 miles (230 km) south of Mendoza. Each visiting artist added special touches that remain today, making the property a museum of sorts, and truly unique. Susana, who shared a profound friendship with author and poet Jorge Luis Borges, owned the property until 1992. The property features original works of art and culture from many famous Argentinean figures including Borges, Raúl Soldi, Hector Basaldua, and Manuel Mujica Láinez.

The estate, which now serves as a boutique hotel, is still owned by the Bombal family, who also run the hotel.

Mural in Finca Los Alamos painted by Hector Basaldua

== Features ==
Borges Memorial Maze garden labyrinth; figure is Camilo Aldao, one of the estancia's current owners

The property includes El Laberinto de Borges (Borges Memorial Maze), a garden labyrinth planted in 2003, which consists of approximately 12,000 English Boxwood shrubs. The 66,456 ft^{2} (6,174.0 m^{2}) box hedge maze measures 312 ft (95 m) by 213 ft (65 m), and was designed by Randoll Coate, a British diplomat, maze designer, and "labyrinthologist". The maze pays tribute to Jorge Luis Borges (also a personal friend of Coate's) and may have been inspired by Borges' short stories El Jardin de senderos que se bifurcan (The Garden of Forking Paths), and Labyrinths. Shaped like an open book, the design spells out Borges' name as reflected in a mirror, and also pays tribute to writer Maria Kodama, Jorge's widow, by including her initials.

== In literature ==
The estate is featured in the book Estancias, The Great Houses and Ranches of Argentina, by Maria Saenz Quesada. The book details over thirty historical Argentine properties with origins as far back as the 16th century, through their rise at the end of the 18th century (when these estates played an integral role in making Argentina one of the world's most powerful economic empires), and the significant functions of these estancias today. The book suggests that Los Alamos may be the oldest house to survive the 1861 Mendoza earthquake that devastated the Province.

Estancias, The Great Houses and Ranches of Argentina, by Maria Saenz Quesada. (Abbeville Press, Inc. 1992) ISBN 978-1-55859-270-4
