= Gabyon Station =

Pastoral lease in Western Australia

Coordinates: 28.249°S 116.340°E

Location in Western Australia

Gabyon Station, commonly referred to as Gabyon, is a pastoral lease that operates as a sheep station in Western Australia.

It is situated about 35 kilometres (22 mi) west of Yalgoo and 85 kilometres (53 mi) east of Mullewa in the Murchison area of the Mid-West region.

The station has as part of its southern border the Geraldton-Mount Magnet Road, and its south western border is close to Pindar. It lies in the south eastern catchment area of the Greenough River. The station to the west is Tallering, and to the north east of its borders are Jingemarra and Dalgaranga stations. It also has two public roads pass through the station – Gabyon Tardie Road and Yalgoo North Road.

The current owners of the 271,500-hectare (670,891-acre) property are Helen and Gemma Cripps, who have opened a farm stay business to supplement the station income following the collapse of the live sheep trade. The property is still running a flock of over 12,000 damaras.

Established prior to 1890, the property was owned by Mr. Lacy in 1891 and was on the route from Geraldton used to travel to the Murchison goldfields. By 1893 the property was supporting a flock of approximately 16,000 sheep. Mr. H. M. Molony, who had a half interest in Gabyon, died in 1903. The value of his share was estimated at £5,250. On instructions from the executors the property was put up for auction in 1904. It was advertised as occupying an area of 564,640 acres (228,502 ha) divided into 20 paddocks with 260 miles (418 km) of fencing and stocked with 11,000 sheep Improvements included a stone homestead, 16-stand shearing shed, 14 windmills and two 10,000-imperial-gallon (45,461 L) water storage tanks.

Wainwright and Company held the lease to Gabyon, Barnong and Pindathirna Stations in 1898, when the area had a good year's rain with pools filled to overflowing and good feed available to stock.

In 1910, Arthur Charles Gillam purchased Gabyon after he had disposed of Chirritta Station in the Pilbara to the Withnell brothers for £20,000.

The station was sold in 2009 by Rob Gillam, whose family had owned the property for 100 years. Gillam had been producing wool from merino sheep.

In 2011 the area was devastated by bushfires, with Gabyon losing 103,000 hectares (254,519 acres) of grazing land to the flames. A large number of sheep were also lost.

== See also ==
- List of ranches and stations
