= Wondoola =

Pastoral lease in Queensland

Coordinates: 18.57282°S 140.89699°E

Location in Queensland

Wondoola or Wondoola Station, often misspelt as Woondoola, is a pastoral lease that operates as a cattle station. It is located about 102 kilometres (63 mi) south of Normanton and 148 kilometres (92 mi) west of Croydon in Queensland.

The property occupies an area of 2,525 square kilometres (975 sq mi) of Queensland's Gulf country and is able to carry a herd of approximately 23,000 cattle. It is currently owned by the Australian Agricultural Company. The property takes its name from Wondoola Creek, a tributary of the Saxby River, both of which run through the property. The Saxby provides 24 miles (39 km) of double frontage to Wondoola then goes on to flow into the Flinders River to which the station has a 33-mile (53 km) frontage. These watercourses offer permanent waterholes available to stock.

The station was established prior to 1880 but was advertised in February of that year to be auctioned in April. At that time, the property adjoined Iffley, Taldora, Tempe Downs and other well known properties. The station was grazing sheep and had a flock of approximately 5,300 grazing its seven blocks of "fine rolling downs and open plains country, alternating with sound well-grassed sand ridges" and having a total area of 294 square miles (761 km^{2}). The plains were clothed in Mitchell grass, blue grass and had an abundance of saltbush and other herbage. The homestead, plant, stores and 20 horses were included in the property.

By 1891 the property was owned by Messrs Haydon and Loughnan and was carrying about 7,000 head of cattle amongst which there were many well known Lee bulls.

The area suffered from a tick plague amongst the cattle in 1895. At least 1,200 bullocks were infested and suffering from tick fever; they were cut from the herd, inoculated and square tailed and sent off to Cunnamulla. About 30 stragglers died from tick fever or pleuropneumonia.

In January 1903, the station was sold along with Vena Park station to Messrs Collins and sons. In June of the same year, the property was taken over by the Queensland National Bank, who promptly sold it to D. C. McConnell and sons for an undisclosed price. They onsold the property almost immediately to Mr Alison, a squatter from New South Wales, for a large profit. The station had between 12,000 and 13,000 cattle on it at the time.

An aircraft landing ground was built at the property in 1941 for landing RAAF aircraft during World War II. While landing occurred infrequently, no RAAF unit was ever quartered in the area.

The property was managed for AACo by Henry Burke from 1988 to 1997; he then took on the much larger Brunette Downs Station in the Northern Territory.

Both Wondoola and Canobie Station are being explored for nickel deposits by a joint partnership between Anglo American and Falcon minerals. The development is known as the Saxby project and further drilling was to occur in 2009.

== See also ==
- List of ranches and stations
