= Estancia =

Large, private plot of land used for farming or cattle-raising

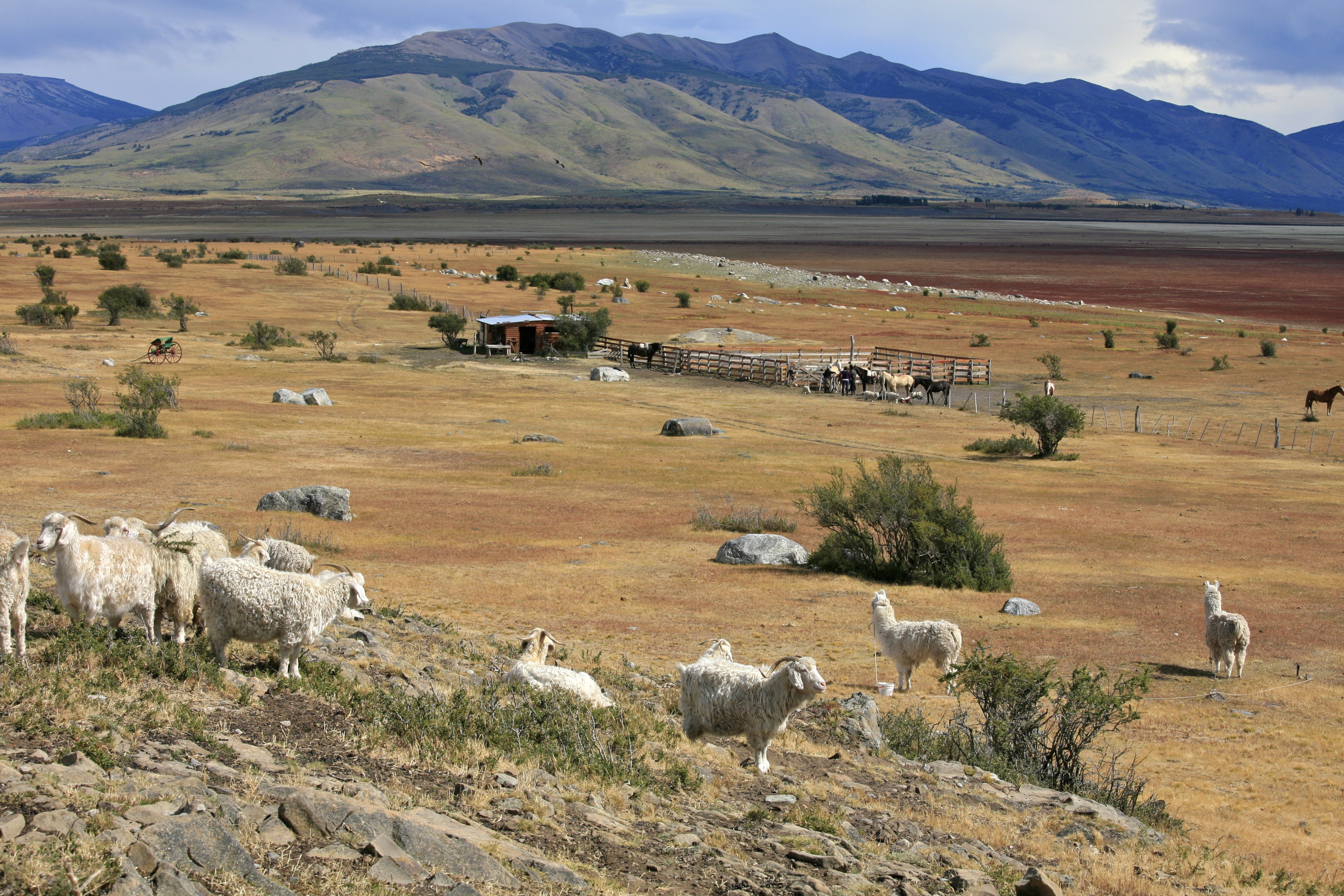
An estancia in Argentine Patagonia near the Andes.

An estancia or estância is a large, private plot of land used for farming or raising cattle or sheep. Estancias are located in the southern South American grasslands of Chilean and Argentine Patagonia, while the pampas have historically been estates used to raise livestock, such as cattle or sheep. In Puerto Rico, an estancia was a farm growing frutos menores; that is, crops for local sale and consumption, the equivalent of a truck farm in the United States. In Chile and Argentina, they are large rural complexes with similarities to what in the United States is called a ranch, and in Australia a station.

== History ==
In the early Caribbean territories and Mexico, holders of encomiendas acquired land in the area where they had access to Indian labor. They needed on-site Hispanic supervisors or labor bosses called estancieros. In Mexico, multiple estancias owned by the same individual could be termed a hacienda. The term estancia is used in various ways in Argentina, Paraguay, Uruguay, southern Chile and southern Brazil. The equivalent in other Spanish American countries would be hacienda.

During the first centuries of Spanish colonial rule, the Spanish introduced cattle into the colonies for livestock. In the peripheral areas of northern Mexico and the southern part of South America, these animals roamed free; settlers conducted periodic raids to catch and slaughter them. In the 19th century stationary ranching ventures started to form in the pampas, with permanent buildings and marked livestock that clearly defined ownership. They were called estancias, the term indicating the stationary, permanent character.

The estancia's ranch worker on horseback in Argentina, the gaucho, has similar status in national folklore and identity to the cowboy of North America. Since the late 20th century, agriculture has intensified as an industry; landowners have often shifted from livestock to crop farming in the pampas of Argentina and Uruguay, due to the region's high soil fertility.

A small number of estancias in Argentina and Uruguay, as well as in Paraguay or Chile, particularly those with historic architecture, have been converted into guest ranches called paradores.

Several cities and villages, mainly but not exclusively in Latin America, developed from such estancias and are named accordingly, for example:

- Estância in Sergipe state, Brazil
- Estancia El Brete, Salta Province, Argentina
- Estancia, Iloilo in the province of Iloilo, Philippines.

=== California mission estancias ===
Many California missions in North America had separate farms and ranchos associated with them. These were known as California mission estancias, which were different from the California ranchos, based on land grants to individuals.

=== In Puerto Rico ===
An estancia, during Spanish colonial times in Puerto Rico (1508–1898), (Note: After the change of sovereignty in 1898 from Spain to United States, and the ensuring industrialization and development of a manufacturing- and services-based society, Puerto Rican estancias gradually diminished to almost non-existent.) was a plot of land used for cultivating frutos menores (minor crops). That is, the crops in such farms were produced in relatively small quantities and thus were meant, not for wholesale or exporting, but for local, island-wide sale and consumption. Some such frutos menores were rice, corn, beans, batatas, ñames, yautías, and pumpkins; among fruits were plantains, bananas, oranges, avocados, and grapefruits. A farm equipped with industrial machinery used for processing its crops into derivatives such as juices, marmalades, flours, etc., for wholesale and export was not called an estancia, but instead was called a hacienda. Most haciendas produced sugar, coffee and tobacco, which were the crops for export. Some estancias were larger than some haciendas, but generally this was the exception and not the norm.

== See also ==
- Finca Los Alamos estancia in Argentina
- Station, in Australia
