= Latigo Ranch =

Coordinates: 40°09′34″N 106°32′57″W

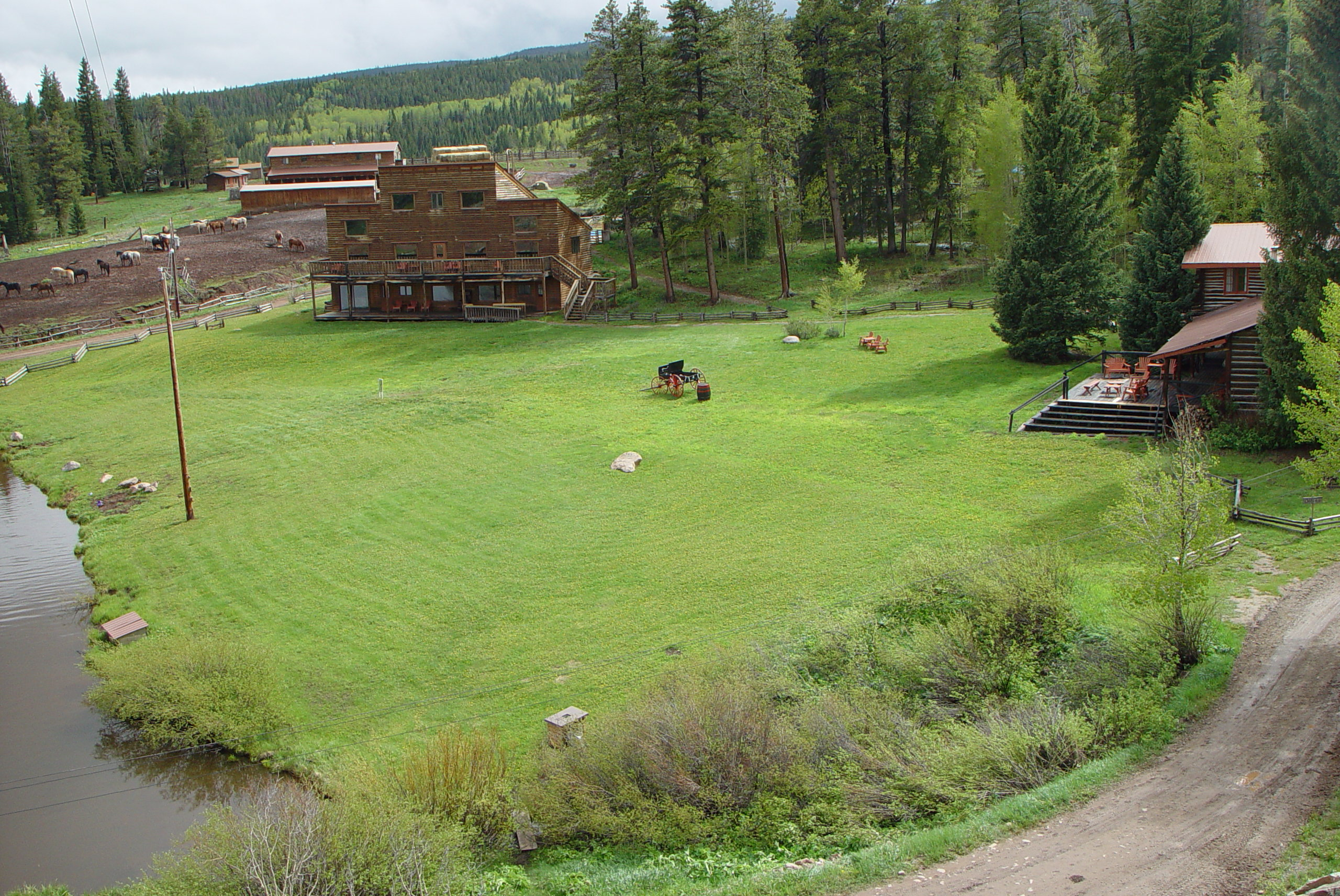
A view of Latigo Ranch's Social Club, Main Lodge, and Barn.

Latigo Ranch was founded as a dude ranch in Grand County, Colorado, by Frederick Kasdorf, Jr. It was originally named Snowshoe Ranch. Kasdorf single-handedly built the Main Log Lodge in 1923 soon after he and his wife arrived (by covered wagon from Denver) to homestead in the Kremmling area. He built up and ran the 550-acre (2.2 km^{2}) Snowshoe Dude Ranch for over 30 years.

Grand County Historical Society speculates that Zane Grey stayed at the Snowshoe Ranch or at least camped nearby while he wrote The Mysterious Rider as the Kasdorfs did say in their advertisements that "guests could ride 'forest-Indian' trails that Theodore Roosevelt and Zane Grey knew"! In 1959, Kasdorf sold the dude ranch operation and headed into retirement. The Christiansons bought the 53 acres (210,000 m^{2}) which included the Lodge, and they added a few cabins and continued the ranching operation. Jack and Dot Lyons bought Snowshoe in 1973, and they sold it to Cece and Sharon Krewson in 1977. He sold it in 1982 to David Wasserstrom of Pennsylvania who, with Bill and Carol Hillier as managers, bought the balance of the original Kasdorf ranch, and making many contemporary improvements, changed the name to Latigo Ranch. Their improvements included construction of a new access road into the ranch, addition of the Social Club, swimming pool, fishing pond, barn and arena, and 3 duplex guest cabins. They sold the ranch in 1987 to Randy and Lisa George and Jim and Kathie Yost. As of 2017, the Yosts went into retirement and currently, Randy and Lisa George as well as their children run and manage the ranch full time.

The George family lives at the ranch year-round and operate Latigo as a Nordic center in the winter and a dude ranch in the summer. Latigo Ranch is relatively small, having a guest capacity of 35. Around 50,000 acres (202 km^{2}) of the land that Latigo uses for horseback riding and cross country skiing is part of the adjacent Medicine Bow - Routt National Forest.

In 2004, Latigo Ranch was voted "Best Dude Ranch in Colorado" by Colorado's Best: The Essential Guide to Favorite Places.
