= Tom Quilty =

Australian station owner, pastoralist, philanthropist, and bush poet

Thomas John Quilty OBE (4 April 1887 – 1979) was an Australian station owner, pastoralist, philanthropist, and bush poet. To this day he still holds the record for the largest freehold land acreage ownership in Australia's history; over 3 million acres (13,000 km²) for a single property. In total, he controlled over 4.5 million acres (19,000 km²) of land. In 1976, Tom Quilty was awarded the OBE (Officer of the Most Excellent Order of the British Empire) for his outstanding services to agricultural primary industry.

== Early life ==
Quilty was born in Normanton, Queensland, to an Irish family with six children. He received schooling at the family stations before being sent to boarding school (1904–07) at St Joseph's Nudgee College, Brisbane.

== Station acquisitions ==
After school, Quilty began his grazier career with his father and brothers Patrick (b.1888) and Reginald (b.1894) by buying large stations in the Kimberley region to run stock for the beef market, as well as breeding and training horses and cattle that could thrive in the harsh and unforgiving territory conditions. He helped his father and brothers Patrick (b. 1888) and Reginald (b. 1894) to run Oakland Park and Euroka Springs, another station which the family had acquired north of Julia Creek. Robust and energetic, he honed his legendary horsemanship by riding with a band of wild young stockmen known as the 'Forest Devils'. In 1909 his parents and two of his sisters moved to Sydney. Property investments in Sydney further increased the family's vast wealth and in 1917 Quilty and Sons bought Bedford Downs Station, near Halls Creek, Western Australia, for £34,000. Patrick managed the notoriously infamous Bedford Downs Station while Tom Quilty managed both Euroka Springs and Oakland Park. The family continued to expand their extensive land ownership by purchasing Springvale Station in 1948, Springvale Station was a neighbouring cattle station to the already Quilty owned Bedford Downs Station. At All Saints Church, Roma, on 30 April 1919 he married fellow Irish native Charlotte Lillian Laura Isis Byrne; they were to have four children Roderick, Patrick, Irene, and Doreen.

== Career as a cattleman ==
Quilty was a cattleman and a resident of northern Australia. He bred and trained stockhorses, racehorses, and polo ponies; his horse Proud Boy won races. He invested in the Kimberley Hotel at Halls Creek and funded a grandstand at the local racing club. To raise funds for the Royal Flying Doctor Service, he published a volume of poems, The Drover's Cook (Sydney, 1958), regarding station life and personal relationships at Springvale Station. The poems remain in publication. Quilty is an exhibit in the Australian Stockman's Hall of Fame for his involvement in the Australian cattle industry.

== Philanthropy and accolades ==
A passionate horseman, in 1966 he donated over 1000 pounds for the creation of a trophy for the Tom Quilty Gold Cup. An event designed to test the skill of horse and rider it was awarded to the winner of a 100-mile (160 km) who could not only complete the gruelling course but whose horse also finished in sound health. Quilty and his good mate RM Williams (the now famous boot and saddle maker) created the Tom Quilty Gold Cup a national championship endurance horse event, held annually in Australia which is now the biggest professional endurance ride in the Southern Hemisphere.

In 1976, Tom Quilty was awarded the prestigious OBE the second highest ranking Order of the British Empire honour for his services to agriculture and primary industry.

After suffering a number of strokes, he resided at Oakland Farm near Capel, Western Australia. He died on 24 November 1979.
