= Ullawarra =

Pastoral lease in Western Australia

Coordinates: 23.48°S 116.112°E

Location in Western Australia

Ullawarra Station, often referred to as Ullawarra, is a pastoral lease that has operated as a sheep station but now operates as a cattle station.

It is located about 150 kilometres (93 mi) west of Paraburdoo and 210 kilometres (130 mi) south east of Onslow in the Pilbara region of Western Australia.

Ullawarra occupies an area of 1,632 square kilometres (630 sq mi) and shares boundaries with Glenflorrie, Maroonah, Kooline, Wanna, Edmund and Amelia Stations as well as the Barlee Range wildlife sanctuary. The country is made up of rugged hills, mountains and ridges, narrow valleys, drainage floors and stony plains. Some narrow floodplains of the Henry River are situated within the station boundaries. In 1979 the property was running about 900 cattle and was able to carry about 1,200 head.

Ullawarra was established by Sam Edwards at some time prior to 1897. When Edwards placed the property on the market in 1903 it encompassed an area of 137,000 acres (55,442 ha) and was stocked with 3,000 sheep and 60 head of cattle.

The property was bought in 1903 by fellow pioneer A. E. Watts, who remained on the property until 1943. In 1931 an estimated 13,000 sheep were shorn at Ullawarra.

The traditional owners of the area are the Tharrkari people, who currently lease and manage the station.

== See also ==
- List of ranches and stations
