= Riversleigh Station =

Riversleigh Station Queensland
- Coordinates: 19°01′59″S 138°43′59″E

Riversleigh Station is a pastoral property within the City of Mount Isa, Queensland, Australia. It is known for the UNESCO World Heritage listed Australian Fossil Mammal Sites.
