= Glenflorrie =

Pastoral lease in Western Australia

Coordinates: 22.936°S 115.982°E

Location in Western Australia

Glenflorrie Station, also known as Glen Florrie Station, is a pastoral lease that operates as a cattle station. It is located about 147 kilometres (91 mi) south of Pannawonica and 175 kilometres (109 mi) west of Paraburdoo in the Pilbara region of Western Australia, and occupies an area of 1,970 square kilometres (761 sq mi).

It is currently owned by Murray and Aticia Grey. The Grey family have been producing Brahman cattle for the live export trade.

The property is watered by Glenflorrie Creek. It lies between the Ashburton and Henry Rivers, and shares boundaries with Uaroo Station. The traditional owners of the area are the Tharrkari people, who currently lease and manage Ullawarra Station.

Glenflorrie was established at some time prior to 1894. In 1896, the property was running both sheep and cattle. It was acquired by G. W. Hall at some time prior to 1900. Hall placed the property up for auction in 1919. At this time, Glenflorrie occupied an area of 630,481 acres (255,147 ha) and was stocked with 7,000 sheep, 300 cattle and 50 horses.

The Higham brothers sold Glenflorrie to the Greenway brothers in 1937.

In 1952 the original homestead was gutted by fire. The new homestead that was being built adjoining the old one was not damaged. At this time the owner of the property was Ron Greenway.

In 2009, the Thudgari Aboriginal people were awarded native title of some 1,200 square kilometres (463 sq mi) in the area including Glenflorrie, Maroonah and Mangaroon Stations. The land use agreement allows the Thudgari access to their traditional lands to hunt, gather and camp.

== See also ==
- List of ranches and stations
