= Ashburton Downs =

Pastoral lease in Western Australia

Coordinates: 23.38536°S 117.03239°E

Location in Western Australia

Ashburton Downs Station, often referred to as Ashburton Downs, is a pastoral lease that once operated as a sheep station and presently operates as a cattle station.

It is located about 68 kilometres (42 mi) west of Paraburdoo and 109 kilometres (68 mi) south west of Tom Price in the Pilbara region of Western Australia.

The property occupies an area of 3,005 square kilometres (1,160 sq mi) with a 75-kilometre (47 mi) stretch of the Ashburton River running south west through the property. The station once adjoined Peake Station on its western boundary. Other properties that it shares boundaries with include Kooline, Amelia, Wyloo, Rocklea, Mininer, Pingandy and Turee Creek Stations, as well as areas of vacant crown land.

Established in the 1880s by a group of investors from Northam, including George Throssell, by 1890 the property was struck by drought, with the flock size being reduced from 16,000 in 1890 to 5,300 the following year.

In 1892 Throssell sold his interest in the property to John Frederick Hancock and later the same year the property manager, Denis Bresnahan, retired from running the station. Ashburton Downs occupied an area of approximately 770,000 acres (3,116 km^{2}). The station was flooded in 1899 when 8 inches (203 mm) of rain fell in less than a month. John Frederick Hancock died in 1902, aged 61. The property was retained by Hancock's sons John, George and Richard, all of who had been managing the station. John Fredrick Jnr was the last of the Hancock brothers to own Ashburton Station, In 1911 the property had a flock of 30,000 sheep and produced 475 bales of wool.

In 1918 the property was passed from Hancock Brothers to the Ashburton Downs Station Ltd. At the time it occupied 755,520 acres (3,057 km^{2}) and was stocked with 19,000 sheep and 320 horses.

In 1949 the property was carrying a flock of 30,000 sheep, but by 1951, following a severe drought, shearing had to be cancelled as the stock were too weak to be droved to the shearing shed.

In 1979 the property was stocked with 300 cattle. In a good season the station is able to carry a herd of approximately 5,000 head of cattle.

== See also ==
- List of pastoral leases in Western Australia
