= Electoral district of Mount Margaret =

Electoral district in Western Australia

Mount Margaret Western Australia—Legislative Assembly
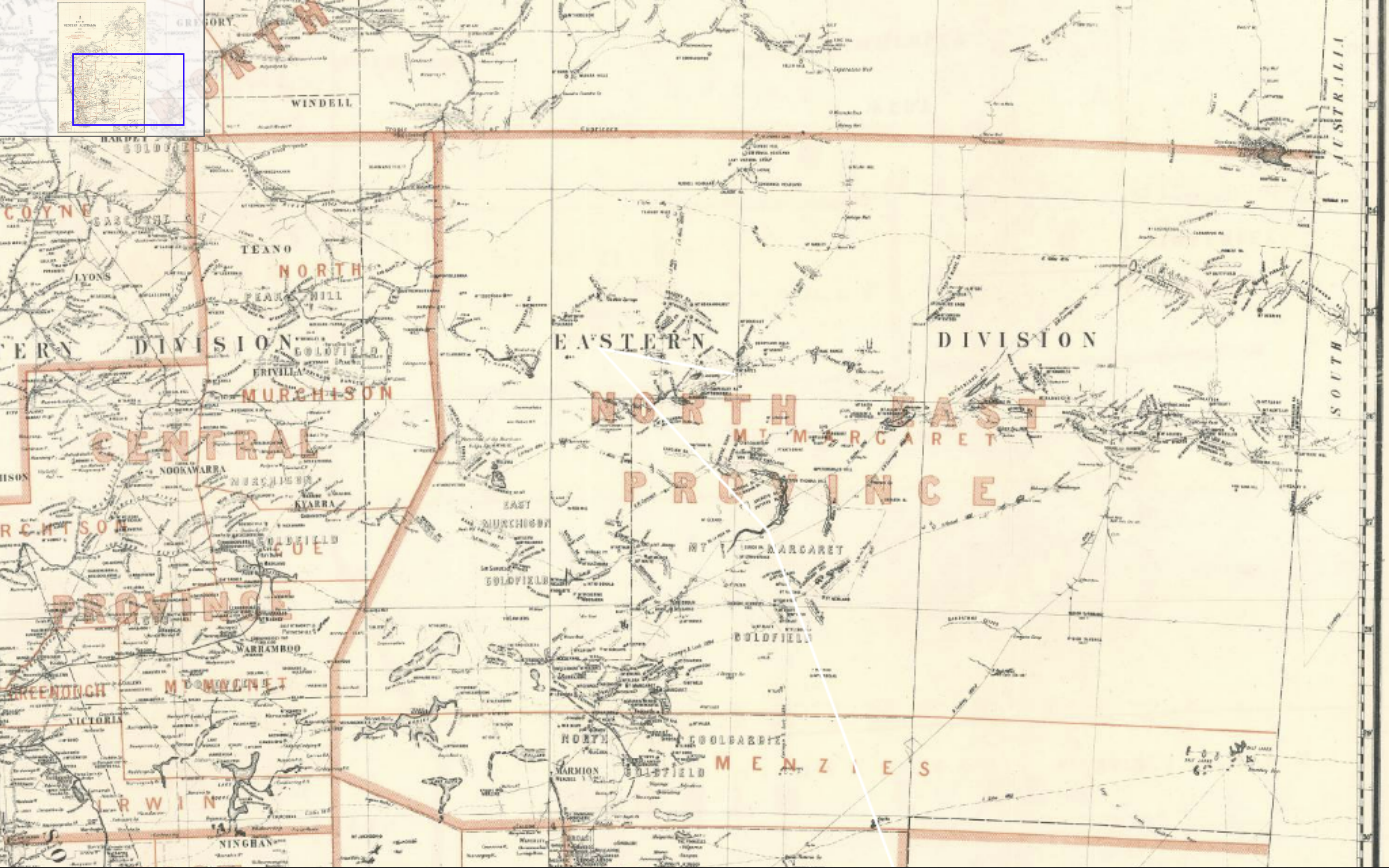
- Mount Margaret and surrounds in 1900
- State: Western Australia
- Dates current: 1901–1930
- Namesake: Mount Margaret

Mount Margaret was an electoral district of the Legislative Assembly in the Australian state of Western Australia from 1901 to 1930, located in the northeastern Goldfields region.

Upon its creation in 1900, the district was the largest in the colony, taking in a significant portion of Western Australia's interior. Its population was based on the Mount Margaret goldfield, including the towns of Malcolm, Murrin Murrin, Mount Leonora, Kurrajong, Woodarra, Sir Samuel, Laverton, Wiluna, and Lawlers. The district had only one member over the course of its 29-year existence. George "Mulga" Taylor was first elected as the Labor Party candidate for seat at the 1901 state election. He later left the Labor Party with several other pro-conscriptionists during World War I, eventually ending his tenure in parliament as a member of the Nationalist Party.

== Members ==
Members	Party	Term
George Taylor	Labor	1901–1917
George Taylor	National Labor	1917–1924
George Taylor	Nationalist	1924–1930
