= Pinnacles Station =

Pastoral lease in Western Australia

Coordinates: 28.198°S 120.439°E

Location in Western Australia

Pinnacles Station is a pastoral lease in Western Australia that once operated as a cattle station and now operates as a sheep station.

It is situated approximately 40 kilometres (25 mi) southwest of Leinster and 116 kilometres (72 mi) northwest of Leonora in the Goldfields-Esperance region. The station surrounds the now abandoned town of Lawlers; it shares boundaries with Leinster Downs Station to the north, as well as Dandarraga, Sturt Meadows and Ida Valley stations to the south.

Pinnacles was established in 1896 by Messrs Routledge, Morris and Willis. Droughts followed but in 1909 it experienced the best season since 1896, with wildflowers blooming across the grazing lands and 300 cattle being overlanded down from the Kimberley region. The property was put up for auction in 1920, when it occupied an area of 755,100 acres (305,578 ha) and was stocked with approximately 1,100 head of cattle. Still owned by Routledge and Co. it had 18 wells, a homestead, approximately 25 acres (10 ha) of miners' cottages and special leases and five town blocks.

It was acquired by Mr. A. Geerling, who continued to breed cattle on the run and make improvements to make it ready to stock with sheep. By 1925 the property had been acquired by Hawker, Chomley and Co., who were expanding neighbouring Sturt Meadows Station and were stocking both with sheep from the eastern states. By the following year it had changed hands again, Messrs Manifold, Black and McKenna purchasing Pinnacles for £30,000. The company formed by the group, Pinnacles Proprietary Limited, appointed a new manager named McKinnon to run the 760,000-acre (307,561 ha) station, which had recently had a new homestead constructed and was building a new shearing shed. Other improvements included 55 equipped wells, 200 miles (322 km) of fencing and a telephone line. The property was stocked with 7,000 sheep and 2,000 head of cattle. It was estimated the run would be capable of supporting a flock of 40,000 sheep. In 1928 the flock had grown to 10,000 sheep.

An aerodrome had been built on the property at some time prior to 1939. In the same year the area was flooded following heavy rains. For the next four years the area was struck by drought. The McKinnon family eventually acquired Pinnacles and retained possession until 1987 when the family sold it.

== See also ==
- List of ranches and stations
- List of pastoral leases in Western Australia
