= Glenorn =

Pastoral lease in Western Australia

Coordinates: 29°05′05″S 121°40′24″E

Location in Western Australia

Glenorn is a pastoral lease that has operated as both a sheep and cattle station. It is located about 40 kilometres (25 mi) south east of Leonora and 33 kilometres (21 mi) north east of Kookynie in the Goldfields of Western Australia,

The Laverton to Leonora railway passes through the property and had five of its stops being located within the station boundaries.

Initially established by the Horan brothers, who were butchers, in about 1903, the station was running cattle along with a small flock of sheep. The Horans were the first to take up pastoral pursuits in the area, which was mostly a gold mining centre. They noted that the area was rich in mulga and saltbush year round with abundant natural grasses following rain.

The property was carrying a flock of about 2,000 sheep in 1921.

Sold by the Horan brothers before 1924, the station was bought by the Foulkes-Taylor brothers, E. L. Lefroy and L. Manning, who together formed the Mt. Malcolm Pastoral Company. In 1925 the station occupied an area of 250,000 acres (101,171 ha) and was running approximately 10,000 sheep and was fully enclosed in vermin-proof fencing. So impressed with the country, the men also bought another 300,000 acres (121,406 ha) of adjoining country to the north that surrounded the town of Morgans, which was carrying 1,400 head of cattle and was sold to them by David Dicks of the Boulder Meat supply. This property, known as Mernong, gave the company a fairly compact block in excess of half a million acres. One of the company directors, Chas Taylor, was managing the station in 1924.

By 1928 the flock size had been increased to 12,000 sheep with Lefroy and Foulkes-Taylor introducing Peppin blood rams from the Tootra and Cranmore park studs into the flock. The sheep were in splendid condition following a good season. The station manager, Chas Foulkes-Taylor, left in 1928 to take up Yuin Station in the Murchison region.

Selling 91 bales of wool at the Perth wool sales in 1929, Glenorn wool attracted an average price of about 12 1/2 d. per pound. Following up with 222 bales in 1930 the average price was lower across the whole market and Glenorn wool attracted an average price of about 11d. per pound.

A good clip was produced in 1949 when a total of 12,245 sheep including 3,084 lambs were shorn to produce 322 bales; the flock size in 1950 was only 3,572 sheep that were shorn in May to yield 89 bales of wool.

In 1954 10 bales of AAA combings attracted a price of 114d. per pound.

Glenorn is currently owned by Minara Resources, along with three other nearby properties: Nambi, Yundamindera and Minara Stations. In 2012 Glenorn and Nambi were running approximately 1,700 head of cattle. By 2016 all four stations were running a herd of cattle.

== See also ==
- List of ranches and stations
