= Mertondale Station =

Pastoral lease in Western Australia

Coordinates: 28.682°S 121.538°E

Location in Western Australia

Mertondale or Mertondale Station is a pastoral lease, most recently operated as a cattle station, but previously run as a sheep station. It is located about 30 kilometres (19 mi) north east of Leonora and 84 kilometres (52 mi) west of Laverton in the Goldfields of Western Australia. Mertondale adjoins Nambi, Clover Downs and Tarmoola Stations.

The now abandoned town of Mertondale once stood within the station boundaries. The town was gazetted in 1899 following a gold discovery, but was abandoned in 1910.

Andrew McDonald retired from managing the property and left the area in 1950.

The property is run in conjunction with Clover Downs Station. Together they occupy a combined area of 149,801 hectares (370,166 acres) and were placed on the market for A$1.2 million in 2013. They have a carrying capacity of 9,000 sheep and 1,300 cattle. Small areas of the station have been infested with the coral cactus, which had spread to Mertondale from neighbouring Tarmoola Station.

In 2020 the Department of Defence bought the station to protect the Jindalee Operational Radar Network against Chinese attention.

== See also ==
- List of ranches and stations
