= Nambi =

Pastoral lease in Western Australia

Coordinates: 28°23′28″S 121°40′39″E

Location in Western Australia

Nambi is a pastoral lease and sheep station located about 65 kilometres (40 mi) north east of Leonora and 110 kilometres (68 mi) south east of Leinster in the Goldfields of Western Australia.

The station was established in 1899.

The property was owned by the Leonora Pastoral company in 1925, who ran cattle on the leasehold. The company sold 129 mixed cattle at Midland Junction sales in December 1929, another 28 in January 1930, and another 30 in March 1930.

Plans were afoot to change to sheep as early as 1925 when Geo Sexton, one of the company directors, arrived at the station to commence fencing in preparation for the arrival of sheep there. The station had also recently purchased eight trucks.

By 1926 Nambi sold some of their first clip with 55 wool bales sold at the Perth sales in October 1926. and another 46 bales in 1928.

Approximately 10,000 sheep were shorn at Nambi in 1928, with a total clip of 252 bales. The shearing shed had recently been fitted with six stands of Lister machinery, whereas shearing had been all done by hand in the past.

The Leonora Pastoral company put the property up for auction in 1930, advertising the property as having an area of 758,321 acres (306,882 ha) with tenure up until 1948. The station had 170 miles (274 km) of 5 or 6 wire sheep-proof fencing enclosing 280,000 acres (113,312 ha) into 14 paddocks, and an additional 77 miles (124 km) of cattle fencing also in place. Water was available from 23 wells complete with windmills for a flock of approximately 11,000 sheep, of which about 6,000 were breeding ewes, 70 cattle and 100 horses.

The station was sold to the Murrum Pastoral Company and Mrs C. Fitzgerald in August 1930. They had bought the station for £18,600 with all plant but no sheep. At this time the station occupied an area of 758,320 acres (306,881 ha) and had over 250 miles (402 km) of fencing in place. Having little surface water, the property also had 28 wells and in 1930 carried a flock of 9,500 sheep. One of Nambi's neighbours is Clover Downs Station.

William Fitzgerald, of the Murrum Pastoral Company, died in December 1933, leaving his wife and two sons. One son, Cyril Irwin Fitzgerald, is the manager at Nambi, while the other, Victor Fitzgerald, is the manager at Murrum Station.

In 1937 the station bought an additional 70 Bungaree blood rams from the Hagley stud in Tammin, followed by another 25 in 1938.

A station employee, William Paul, inadvertently shot himself with his own weapon outside the men's quarters in 1941. The bullet grazed his ribs and lodged in his left arm, but the wound was not serious.

The station had a good year in 1948 when 17,715 sheep were shorn and 465 bales of wool were collected, an increase of 3,500 sheep on the previous year. Lambing was estimated at 81%.

Two shearers, members of Len Mitchell's shearing team, became lost when out shooting following rain; this held up shearing in 1949. The two men, Don McDonald and Ronald Bacon went shooting and became lost in the bush where they spent two of the coldest and wettest nights of the year. Both men were found safe and well about 12 miles (19 km) from the homestead. Vehicles and trackers from the station covered over 400 miles (644 km) in the search for the men.

The following year the station sold off 3,000 sheep to nearby Wilbah Station.

Cyril Irwin Joseph Fitzgerald, who had owned and managed Nambi since 1933, died in January 1951, aged 41. He left his entire estate to his widow.

Glencore Australia currently owns Nambi, along with three other nearby properties: Glenorn, Yundamindera and Minara Stations. In 2012 Glenorn and Nambi were running approximately 1,700 head of cattle. By 2016 all four stations were running a herd of cattle.

== See also ==
- List of ranches and stations
