= List of State Register of Heritage Places in the Shire of Leonora =

List of heritage places in the Goldfields-Esperance region of Western Australia

The State Register of Heritage Places is maintained by the Heritage Council of Western Australia. As of 2026, 95 places are heritage-listed in the Shire of Leonora, of which 47 are on the State Register of Heritage Places.

== List ==
The Western Australian State Register of Heritage Places, as of 2026, lists the following 47 state registered places within the Shire of Leonora:

Place name	Place #	Street number	Street name	Suburb or town	Co-ordinates	Notes & former names	Photo
Gwalia Townsite Precinct	1459		Gwalia Townsite	Gwalia	28.911021°S 121.331169°E		
Art's Place	1460	Corner	Tower & Kane Streets	Gwalia	28.914669°S 121.330594°E		
Mick Omedi's Camp	1461	Lot 521	Tower Street	Gwalia	28.912201°S 121.331258°E	Burglar Bill's place	
Mazza's Store	1462	Lot 518	Tower Street	Gwalia	28.912745°S 121.331258°E		
State Hotel (former)	1463	Corner	Kane & Streetation Streets	Gwalia	28.914609°S 121.328957°E	Sons of Gwalia Mine Office	
Little Pink Camp & 8 Dwellings	1464	Lot 1132	Tower Street	Gwalia	28.913644°S 121.330278°E	inc. White House Hotel, Sons of Gwalia Mining Camp	
Gwalia Museum Group	1465		Tower Street	Gwalia	28.914675°S 121.334288°E	Gwalia Conservation Area	
Patroni's Guest Home	1466	Lot 514& 515	Tower Street	Gwalia	28.913309°S 121.331093°E		
Barnes Federal Theatre (former)	1474	Lot 71	Tower Street	Leonora	28.880153°S 121.330438°E		
Longa's Place	3807		Tower Street	Gwalia	^{[?]}		
Martinazolli's Camp	3808		Reloc NE of State Hotel	Gwalia	^{[?]}	Camp 93	
Small Miners Camp	3809			Gwalia	^{[?]}		
Three Roofed Camp	3810		Loring Street	Gwalia	^{[?]}		
Miners House	3811			Gwalia	^{[?]}		
De Rubi Camp	3812		Reloc NE of State Hotel	Gwalia	^{[?]}		
National Bank (former), Leonora	3815	Lot 25	Tower Street	Leonora	28.883103°S 121.331263°E	Leonora Information Centre	
Mine Superintendents House	4235	Loc 1127	Tower Street	Gwalia	28.915007°S 121.335223°E	Hoover House, Garden of Mine Managers House	
Three Wells	7171			Leonora	^{[?]}	Part of Leonora-Gwalia Water Supply Group (10520)	
Leonora-Gwalia Water Supply Group	10520		Station Creek, Ptn Goldfields Highway	Leonora & Mt George	28.774769°S 121.302427°E	Stone Tank, Buttress Tank, Station Creek Reservoir	
Stone Water Tank	10952		Reserve 8575	Leonora	28.881611°S 121.335948°E		
Old Dam	10954		Reserve 11267	Leonora	28.774769°S 121.302427°E	Station Creek Reservoir	
Two Dwellings	10956		Tower Street	Gwalia	28.912564°S 121.330497°E		
Dwelling	10958	Lot 566	Tower Street	Gwalia	28.911566°S 121.331259°E		
Dwelling	10959	Lot 577	Gwalia Street	Gwalia	28.911566°S 121.331826°E		
Camp 80, Gwalia	10960	Lot 936	Gwalia Street	Gwalia	28.912546°S 121.332444°E		
Jim's House	10961	Lot 524	Gwalia Street	Gwalia	28.912564°S 121.331826°E		
Dwelling	10962	Lot 872	Tower Street	Gwalia	28.910083°S 121.331259°E		
Dwelling	10963	Lot 858	Tower Street	Gwalia	28.910023°S 121.330434°E		
Dwelling	10964	Lot 868	Tower Street	Gwalia	28.909298°S 121.331259°E		
Dwelling	10965	Lot 1267	Tower Street	Gwalia	28.907645°S 121.331592°E		
Dwelling	10966	913	Tower Street	Gwalia	28.907209°S 121.330435°E		
Dwelling	10967	Lot 856	Otterburn Street	Gwalia	28.909841°S 121.329867°E		
Banjo's Place	10968			Gwalia	28.914621°S 121.329461°E		
Ken - Midland Woodline Steam Engine	10969	1128	Tower Street	Gwalia	28.914858°S 121.334247°E		
Dwelling	10971	Lot 487	Manning Street	Gwalia	28.913471°S 121.329442°E		
Aldoss	10972	8	Manning Street	Gwalia	28.912813°S 121.329443°E		
Dwelling	10973	Lot 479	Station Street	Gwalia	28.913289°S 121.328945°E		
Three Dwellings	10974		Otterburn Street	Gwalia	28.910567°S 121.329145°E		
Station Master's House, Leonora	15851	20	Kurrajong Street	Leonora	28.885503°S 121.326275°E		
No 1 Tram	16621		Gwalia Historic Precinct	Gwalia	^{[?]}		
Dwelling (502)	24397	Lot 502	Tower Street	Gwalia	28.912564°S 121.330497°E		
Assay Building	24429	Lot 1128	Tower Street	Gwalia	28.914999°S 121.334395°E		
Dwelling (504)	24448	Lot 504	Tower Street	Gwalia	28.912927°S 121.330497°E		
Patroni's Guest House (515)	24458	Lot 515	Tower Street	Gwalia	28.91329°S 121.331258°E		
Patroni's Guest House (514)	24490	Lot 514	Tower Street	Gwalia	28.913471°S 121.331258°E		
Former Mine Office	24492	Lot 1127	Tower Street	Gwalia	28.914984°S 121.334676°E		
Headframe and Winder House & Engine	24523	Lot 1128	Tower Street	Gwalia	28.914657°S 121.334456°E		

=== Notes ===
- ^[?] No coordinates specified by Inherit database
