= Vivien, Western Australia =

Abandoned town in Western Australia

Vivien
- Town
- Coordinates: 27.979°S 120.563°E
- Country: Australia
- State: Western Australia
- LGA: Shire of Leonora
- Location: 982 km (610 mi) NE of Perth; 14 km (8.7 mi) west of Leinster

Government
  - State electorate: Kalgoorlie
  - Federal division: O'Connor

Vivien is an abandoned mining town located between Leinster and Leonora in the Goldfields-Esperance region of Western Australia.

Initially the town was known as Harris; it was developed in 1903 then extended in 1905 when the local progress association asked for additional lots to be surveyed. It was around this time the town became known as Vivien, because the Vivien Gold Mine and the Vivien Gem Reef were both located close by. The townsite was gazetted in 1906.

The name Vivien is thought to be in honour of the author May Vivienne, whose book about her travels about the Western Australian goldfields was published in 1902.
