= Yundamindera, Western Australia =

Abandoned town in Western Australia

Yundamindera
- Town
- Coordinates: 29°07′16″S 122°02′20″E
- Country: Australia
- State: Western Australia
- LGA: Shire of Leonora
- Location: 865 km (537 mi) ENE of Perth; 74 km (46 mi) SE of Leonora
- Established: 1901

Government
  - State electorate: Kalgoorlie
  - Federal division: O'Connor
- Elevation: 448 m (1,470 ft)
- Postcode: 6435

Yundamindera, also once known as The Granites, is an abandoned town located between Leonora and Laverton in the Shire of Leonora in the Goldfields–Esperance region of Western Australia. The town is surrounded by pastoral stations, mostly raising sheep. Some of the leases include Yundamindera Station, Mount Remarkable Station and Mount Celia Station.

== History ==
Gold was discovered in the area in the late 1897 after gold at the nearby field of Pennyweight Point began to run out. Two prospectors, Wood and his nephew Deimal, found gold near the Granites, and following an influx of prospectors and miners declaration of a townsite was deemed necessary by 1901. The townsite was gazetted later the same year. The goldfield warden proposed the name Yundamindera, which he told the locals was the Aboriginal name for the area. The meaning of the name is unknown.

Some of the mines that were established in 1899 were the Great Bonaparte, the Queen of the May and the Golden Treasure South. Water for the town was sourced from nearby wells and soaks. A coach service ran once a week in 1908 from Coolgardie via Menzies to the town. By 1903 a coach ran twice a week to Murrin Murrin.

A branch of the Western Australian Bank was opened in the town in 1901. A local board of health was also established earlier the same year.

By January 1903 the local progress committee were in discussion with the Education Department to appoint a teacher for the district as a result of "the good number of children of school-going age about the town". The teacher, Sara Ramsden, was appointed in September that year.

Gibb Maitland, the government geologist, surveyed the area between Yundamindera and Edjudina in 1903 and later compiled a report on the mineralogy of the fields.

In June of the same year £700 worth of amalgam was stolen from the Mount Margaret Reward Mine. The robbers burst the safe to access the gold bearing amalgam. This was the second incident at the site during the year, the first incident involved thieves taking the gold slime from the premises.

The government subsidised battery was constructed near the town in 1903 and was still operating in the area by 1919 and crushed packets of ore for most of the mines in the locale.

Over 100 workers at the Potosi mine went on strike in 1904 when a notice of reduction of wages was posted at the mine. The men were all mostly members of the (then unregistered) Australian Workers' Union, with some being members of the Construction, Forestry, Mining and Energy Union. The Potosi Gold mining company later initiated a lockout and the case was taken before the local warden's court. In November the warden, Mr Ewing, found in favour of the workers and the company was fined £10 and costs.

The area experienced another gold rush when alluvial gold was found by Larkins and party about 30 miles (48 km) south east of the town in 1904. Over sixty men were working the field by December and obtaining fine gold. Several miners from the Potosi mine left to proceed to the find.

A windmill and storage tank with a capacity of 454,609 litres (100,000 imp gal) were constructed to draw water from a government well located close to town. The construction was completed in November 1905 by the Public Works Department with the tank supported on a swan jarrah stand.

The Potosi Consolidated Company virtually ceased mining operations in May 1907 after experiencing financial difficulties. The Government Huntingdon Mill was also closed at about the same time, causing concern among local prospectors who had over 400 tons of ore to crush. It was hoped that ore could be processed at the Potosi Battery.

A 10 head battery was purchased and installed at the Golden Treasure mine in November 1907.

In 1908 a woodcutter, Philip Costello, attempted to murder another patron named James Gray at the Victoria Hotel following a dispute at the hotel when he fired a pistol belonging to his employer at Gray. The local constable, who was at the hotel at the time, arrested Costello.

A fire in 1910 gutted Messers Raftis and Twomey's store on the main street. The fire broke out at 2:30 am and was fanned by an easterly breeze; its cause is not known but both the brick frontage and the iron additions were quickly engulfed. The premises and stock were fully insured. Later the same year an Aboriginal man known as Charcoal was murdered by another Aboriginal man known as Wombat. He was arrested and eventually sentenced to three months prison, the light sentence resulting from the man being greatly provoked.

The area received 10 inches (254 mm) of rain up to July 1910, which is well above average, 4 inches (102 mm) of the fall coming in January. This resulted in excellent feed and herbage being available to cattle, which thrived in the conditions.

The Golden Treasure gold mine ceased operations by April 1910 with all the equipment being sold off. On the final day 38 tons of ore were crushed with 111 ounces (3,146.8 g) of gold being recovered.

A heavy rainstorm in November 1910 wrecked several buildings and many small animals were killed by hailstones the size of pigeon eggs that fell at the height of the storm. 50 points of rain fell during the storm that swept in from the southwest and affected a strip about 5 miles (8 km) wide.

Leitch and party dismantled the battery at the Battlesville gold mine and resurrected it at the Queen of the May mine in town in 1921. Ore from the Big Stone lease that was being mined at the time was also expected to be processed at the new battery.

By 1936 the site was a ghost town with the old Granite's Hotel being used as shearers' quarters since 1925.
