= Mount Morgan =

Mount Morgan may refer to:

== Mountain peaks ==
=== United States ===
- Mount Morgan (Inyo County, California)
- Mount Morgan (Mono County, California)
- Mount Morgan (Montana)

=== Elsewhere ===
- Mount Morgan (Antarctica)
- Mount Morgan (Northern Territory), Australia, on Mittiebah Station

== Other ==
- Mount Morgan, Queensland, a town in Australia
  - Mount Morgan Mine, a copper, gold and silver mine in Queensland, Australia
  - Mount Morgan State High School

== See also ==
- Mount Morgans Gold Mine, Western Australia
- Mount Morgans, Western Australia, an abandoned town
- Morgan Mountain, California, U.S.
- Morgan Peak, Antarctica
- Morgan Summit, a mountain pass in California, U.S.
