= Woodarra, Western Australia =

Woodarra
- Town
- Coordinates: 27.929°S 121.297°E
- Country: Australia
- State: Western Australia
- LGA: Shire of Leonora
- Location: 1,027 km (638 mi) NE of Perth; 59 km (37 mi) NW of Leinster
- Established: 1898

Government
  - State electorate: Kalgoorlie
  - Federal division: O'Connor
- Elevation: 464 m (1,522 ft)
- Postcode: 6435

Woodarra, also once known as Darlot or Lake Darlot, is an abandoned town located between Leinster and Laverton in the Goldfields–Esperance region of Western Australia. The town is situated close to Lake Darlot.

Gold was discovered in the area in the 1890s, and following an influx of prospectors and miners the Lake Darlot progress association lobbied for the declaration of a townsite. Lots were surveyed in 1896 and the progress association asked for the town to be named Woodarra. The townsite was gazetted in 1898.

A bicycle postal service to and from Lawlers was established in 1895, this was later replaced with a mail run from Cue via Lawlers. In 1896 the mail run was again changed, this time from Mount Magnet via Lawlers; that lasted for six years.

The name is Aboriginal in origin and is the name of a granite rock formation located near the town's water supply.
