= Mertondale, Western Australia =

Abandoned town in Western Australia

Mertondale
- Town
- Coordinates: 28.67°S 121.536°E
- Country: Australia
- State: Western Australia
- LGA: Shire of Leonora
- Location: 864 km (537 mi) north east of Perth; 31 km (19 mi) NE of Leonora
- Established: 1899

Government
  - State electorate: Kalgoorlie
  - Federal division: O'Connor
- Elevation: 460 m (1,510 ft)
- Postcode: 6438

Mertondale is an abandoned town located between Leonora and Laverton in the Goldfields-Esperance region of Western Australia.

A prospector named Fred Merton discovered gold in the area in 1898 and the claim turned out to be an exceedingly rich find. The mining warden suggested that a townsite should be declared in 1899, and it was gazetted later the same year.

Merton's lease, named Merton's Reward or Merton's Find, was the main mine in the town. Merton himself suggested the name Mertondale. The gold petered out by 1910 and the town was deserted shortly afterward.

A pastoral lease, Mertondale Station, takes its name from the old townsite, which is situated within the station boundaries. In 2020 the Department of Defence bought the station to protect the Jindalee Operational Radar Network against Chinese attention.
