= Swainsona incei =

Scientific classification
- Kingdom: Plantae
- Clade: Tracheophytes
- Clade: Angiosperms
- Clade: Eudicots
- Clade: Rosids
- Order: Fabales
- Family: Fabaceae
- Subfamily: Faboideae
- Genus: Swainsona
- Species: S. incei

Binomial name
- Swainsona incei W.R.Price

Species of plant

Swainsona incei is a species of flowering plant in the family Fabaceae and is endemic to inland Western Australia. It is an erect or ascending annual, sometimes perennial herb with imparipinnate leaves with 5 to 9 lance-shaped to elliptic leaflets, and racemes of 2 to 30 purple flowers.

== Description ==
Swainsona incei is an erect or ascending annual, sometimes perennial herb, that typically grows to a height of about 25 cm (9.8 in), sometimes to 3 m (9.8 ft) and has many strongly ridged stems 2–8 mm (0.079–0.315 in) wide. Its leaves are imparipinnate, mostly 50–80 mm (2.0–3.1 in) long on an elongated petiole with 5 to 9 lance-shaped to elliptic leaflets mostly 10–30 mm (0.39–1.18 in) long and 3–10 mm (0.12–0.39 in) wide. There are stipules 5–8 mm (0.20–0.31 in) long at the base of the petiole. The flowers are arranged in racemes 2–30 mm (0.079–1.181 in) long with 2 to 30 flowers on a peduncle 0.5–1.0 mm (0.020–0.039 in) wide, each flower 10–12 mm (0.39–0.47 in) long on a softly hairy pedicel 1–2 mm (0.039–0.079 in) long. The sepals are joined at the base, forming a tube about 2 mm (0.079 in) long, the sepal lobes equal to or longer than the tube. The petals are purple, the standard petal 10–15 mm (0.39–0.59 in) long and 13–15 mm (0.51–0.59 in) wide, the wings 7–9 mm (0.28–0.35 in) long, and the keel 8–11 mm (0.31–0.43 in) long and 3–4 mm (0.12–0.16 in) deep. Flowering occurs from July to September, and the fruit is a narrowly oval pod about 15 mm (0.59 in) long and 5–7 mm (0.20–0.28 in) wide with a short stalk and the remains of the style about 4 mm (0.16 in) long.

== Taxonomy ==
Swainsona incei was first formally described in 1910 by William Robert Price in the Bulletin of Miscellaneous Information from specimens collected by W.H. Ince, probably on "Mt Sir Samuel, near Lawlers". The specific epithet (incei) honours Walter Holinshed Ince and/or his sister Miss M.B. Ince.

== Distribution and habitat ==
This species of Swainsona grows on well-drained sandy or gravelly soil in the Carnarvon, Coolgardie, Gascoyne, Murchison and Pilbara bioregions of inland Western Australia.
