= Duketon, Western Australia =

Abandoned town in Western Australia

Duketon
- Town
- Coordinates: 27.639°S 122.283°E
- Country: Australia
- State: Western Australia
- LGA: Shire of Laverton
- Location: 1,067 km (663 mi) NNE of Perth; 110 km (68 mi) north of Laverton

Government
  - State electorate: Kalgoorlie
  - Federal division: O'Connor
- Elevation: 538 m (1,765 ft)
- Postcode: 6440

Duketon is an abandoned town in the Goldfields-Esperance region of Western Australia, located north of Leonora. The town boomed during the early 1900s as a result of gold being discovered in the area. One of the larger mines in the area, The Golden Spinifex, built a five head stamp mill in 1902–1903. A petition for the government to construct a state battery was presented to the minister for mines by the local MLA signed by 58 leaseholders, prospectors and miners from Duketon. The battery was built in 1904 and operated near the town. By 1905 the town had a hotel, bakery, a bank branch along with a variety of other stores.
