= Tarmoola Station =

Pastoral lease in Western Australia

Coordinates: 28.719°S 121.149°E

Location in Western Australia

Tarmoola or Tarmoola Station is a pastoral lease that operates as a cattle station located about 25 kilometres (16 mi) north west of Leonora and 100 kilometres (62 mi) south of Leinster in the Goldfields–Esperance region of Western Australia. The western boundary of Tarmoola adjoins Sturt Meadows Station.

The property was established on land that was previously owned by the Leonora Pastoral Company but had remained largely undeveloped. Reuben McBride inspected the area and took up a lease over approximately 500,000 acres (202,343 ha) in 1923. Together with W. G. Hawkes, McBride formed the Tarmoola Pastoral Company in 1924 and embarked on an improvement program. Shortly afterwards some 240,000 acres (97,125 ha) was fenced and several bores had been sunk.

The property encompassed an area of approximately 600,000 acres (242,811 ha) in 1925. The area had just come out of drought conditions and was being stocked with sheep. A consignment of 3,300, worth £10,000 was delivered from South Australia.

The area suffered a four-year drought that ended in 1947 with Tarmoola recording 1 inch (25 mm) of rain in a single day.

In 1950 the property was acquired by J. G. Money, who also owned Weebo and Willara stations along with large dairy properties. McBride remained on Tarmoola as manager but retired and left the area later the same year.

In 2014 the owner of the property was the Saint Barbara mining company. The property was destocked in 2014 and was suffering from an infestation of coral cactus. The cactus had spread from a few plants that were discarded at the tip to a core area of 3 hectares (7 acres) with isolated clumps spread over an area of 66 square kilometres (25 sq mi).

== See also ==
- List of ranches and stations
