= Electoral results for the district of Mount Margaret =

Western Australian state election results

This is a list of electoral results for the Electoral district of Mount Margaret in Western Australian state elections.

== Members for Mount Margaret ==
Members	Party	Term
George Taylor	Labor	1901–1917
George Taylor	National Labor	1917–1924
George Taylor	Nationalist	1924–1930

== Election results ==
=== Elections in the 1920s ===
1927 Western Australian state election: Mount Margaret
Party	Candidate	Votes	%	±%
Nationalist	George Taylor	212	55.1	+0.2
Labor	Martin Hartigan	173	44.9	−0.2
Total formal votes		385	98.5	−1.2
Informal votes		6	1.5	+1.2
Turnout		391	80.1	+5.1
Nationalist hold		Swing	+0.2	

1924 Western Australian state election: Mount Margaret
Party	Candidate	Votes	%	±%
National Labor	George Taylor	207	54.9	−45.1
Labor	Patrick Maher	170	45.1	+45.1
Total formal votes		377	99.7	
Informal votes		1	0.3	
Turnout		378	75.0	
National Labor hold		Swing	N/A	

1921 Western Australian state election: Mount Margaret
Party	Candidate	Votes	%	±%
National Labor	George Taylor	unopposed		
National Labor hold		Swing		

=== Elections in the 1910s ===
1917 Western Australian state election: Mount Margaret
Party	Candidate	Votes	%	±%
National Labor	George Taylor	513	63.3	–36.7
Labor	George McLeod	298	36.7	+36.7
Total formal votes		811	99.1	n/a
Informal votes		7	0.9	n/a
Turnout		818	75.2	n/a
National Labor hold		Swing	–36.7	

- Taylor had been elected unopposed at the 1914 election.

1914 Western Australian state election: Mount Margaret
Party	Candidate	Votes	%	±%
Labor	George Taylor	unopposed		
Labor hold		Swing		

1911 Western Australian state election: Mount Margaret
Party	Candidate	Votes	%	±%
Labor	George Taylor	unopposed		
Labor hold		Swing		

=== Elections in the 1900s ===
1908 Western Australian state election: Mount Margaret
Party	Candidate	Votes	%	±%
Labour	George Taylor	1,085	71.6	+17.7
Ministerialist	Andrew Faulds	431	28.3	+4.7
Total formal votes		1,516	99.4	+0.4
Informal votes		9	0.6	−0.4
Turnout		1,525	65.8	+36.1
Labour hold		Swing	N/A	

1905 Western Australian state election: Mount Margaret
Party	Candidate	Votes	%	±%
Labour	George Taylor	738	53.9	–46.1
Ministerialist	John Smith	323	23.6	+23.6
Labour	Thomas Campbell	309	22.5	+22.5
Total formal votes		1,370	99.0	n/a
Informal votes		14	1.0	n/a
Turnout		1,384	29.7	n/a
Labour hold		Swing	–46.1	

1904 Western Australian state election: Mount Margaret
Party	Candidate	Votes	%	±%
Labour	George Taylor	unopposed		
Labour hold		Swing		

1901 Western Australian state election: Mount Margaret
Party	Candidate	Votes	%	±%
Labour	George Taylor	771	52.1	+52.1
Opposition	George Hall	709	47.9	+47.9
Total formal votes		1,480	99.1	n/a
Informal votes		14	0.9	n/a
Turnout		1,494	54.9	n/a
Labour win		(new seat)		
