= Swainsona halophila =

Scientific classification
- Kingdom: Plantae
- Clade: Tracheophytes
- Clade: Angiosperms
- Clade: Eudicots
- Clade: Rosids
- Order: Fabales
- Family: Fabaceae
- Subfamily: Faboideae
- Genus: Swainsona
- Species: S. halophila

Binomial name
- Swainsona halophila Joy Thomps.

Species of plant

Swainsona halophila is a species of flowering plant in the family Fabaceae and is endemic to inland areas of Western Australia. It is usually a prostrate annual herb with imparipinnate leaves with 9 to 13 egg-shaped to broadly wedge-shaped leaflets, and racemes of 2 to 9 purple flowers.

== Description ==
Swainsona halophila is usually a prostrate, rarely an ascending annual herb, that typically grows to a height of about 15 cm (5.9 in) and has several stems 0.5–1.5 mm (0.020–0.059 in) wide. Its leaves are imparipinnate 10–80 mm (0.39–3.15 in) long with 9 to 13 egg-shaped to broadly wedge-shaped leaflets with the narrower end towards the base, 1–7 mm (0.039–0.276 in) long and 1–5 mm (0.039–0.197 in) wide. There is a stipule 1–4 mm (0.039–0.157 in) long at the base of the petiole. The flowers are arranged in racemes 10–150 mm (0.39–5.91 in) long with 2 to 9 flowers on a peduncle 0.5–1.5 mm (0.020–0.059 in) long, each flower 6–8 mm (0.24–0.31 in) long in on a dark, softly hairy pedicel 1–3 mm (0.039–0.118 in) long. The sepals are joined at the base, forming a tube 1.5–2.0 mm (0.059–0.079 in) long, the sepal lobes shorter than the tube. The petals are purple, the standard petal 6–9 mm (0.24–0.35 in) long and 7–9 mm (0.28–0.35 in) wide, the wings 6–8 mm (0.24–0.31 in) long, and the keel 6–8 mm (0.24–0.31 in) long. Flowering occurs from July to September, and the fruit is an elliptic pod about 15 mm (0.59 in) long and 7 mm (0.28 in) wide with a stalk about 1 mm (0.039 in) long and the remains of the style about 4 mm (0.16 in) long.

== Taxonomy ==
Swainsona halophila was first formally described in 1993 by Joy Thompson in the journal Telopea from specimens collected near "Mt Sir Samuel, near Lawlers", by Charles Gardner in 1931. The specific epithet (halophila) means "salt-loving".

== Distribution and habitat ==
This species of Swainsona grows on clay flats and near salt lakes in the Gascoyne and Murchison bioregions of inland Western Australia.
