= Malcolm, Western Australia =

Abandoned town in Western Australia

Malcolm
- Town
- Coordinates: 28°56′11″S 121°30′50″E
- Country: Australia
- State: Western Australia
- LGA: Shire of Leonora
- Location: 852 km (529 mi) north east of Perth; 19 km (12 mi) east of Leonora
- Established: 1897

Government
  - State electorate: Kalgoorlie
  - Federal division: O'Connor
- Elevation: 371 m (1,217 ft)
- Postcode: 6438

Malcolm is an abandoned town located between Leonora and Laverton in the Shire of Leonora in the Goldfields-Esperance region of Western Australia. It was also known as Mount Malcolm. Gold was discovered in the area in 1895, and in 1896 the local provisional committee lobbied the government to perform a survey and declare a townsite. The town had six stores, three hotels and two bakeries at this time. The townsite was gazetted in 1897. In 1900 the town was incorporated and had kerosene street lights and a swimming pool. In 1903 over 200 buildings were located in town and the population had reached 450. By 1904 the town had a population of 400 along with six hotels and a brewery.

The town derives its name from a geological feature located just outside the town called Mount Malcolm, which was named by John Forrest while he was exploring in 1869. Forrest had named the feature after his friend and fellow explorer Malcolm Hamersley.

The total area of the town was 259 hectares (1 mi^{2}). The town was also the centre of the Mount Margaret goldfield.

Malcolm was a stop on the Kalgoorlie to Leonora railway line and the junction for the branch line to Laverton.
