= Kathleen, Western Australia =

Ghost town in Western Australia

Kathleen
- Town
- Coordinates: 27.509°S 120.564°E
- Country: Australia
- State: Western Australia
- LGA: Shire of Leonora
- Location: 1,018 km (633 mi) north east of Perth; 50 km (31 mi) north of Leinster
- Established: 1900

Government
  - State electorate: Kalgoorlie
  - Federal division: O'Connor
- Elevation: 499 m (1,637 ft)
- Postcode: 6355

Kathleen is an abandoned town located between Leinster and Wiluna along the Goldfields Highway in the Goldfields-Esperance region of Western Australia.

Gold was discovered in the area in 1897 and it was originally referred to as Kathleen Valley by the locals since gold had been found in the valley area near the town. The townsite was eventually gazetted as in 1900, once the valley part of the name was dropped.

A shop and butchers was opened in 1901 and by 1902 the town supported two hotels. One of the main mines in town was the Yellow Aster mine.

A 95 MW off-grid hybrid power station operates to support the lithium mine. It has 30 MW windpower, 16 MW solar power, a 17 MW / 19 MWh battery, and synchronous condensers to reduce fuel consumption from 26 MW gas motor generator and 5 MW diesel generator.
