= Eulaminna, Western Australia =

Abandoned town in Western Australia

Eulaminna
- Town
- Coordinates: 28.961°S 121.772°E
- Country: Australia
- State: Western Australia
- LGA: Shire of Leonora
- Location: 877 km (545 mi) north east of Perth; 44 km (27 mi) east of Leonora
- Established: 1904

Government
  - State electorate: Kalgoorlie
  - Federal division: O'Connor
- Elevation: 405 m (1,329 ft)
- Postcode: 6435

Eulaminna is an abandoned town located between Leonora and Laverton along the Old Leonora Road in the Shire of Leonora and the Goldfields-Esperance region of Western Australia.

Lots were originally surveyed in 1900 to serve the nearby Murrin Murrin Copper Mine that was known as the Anaconda Copper Mine at the time. By 1903 there were 64 residential lots and a population of about 350. A police station was also established in 1903 and the town boasted two hotels, two stores a chemist and a newsagent. A mail receiver was in place but no telegraph station. The townsite was originally gazetted as Anaconda in 1904, but the name was changed in 1907 after a request from the WA Copper company because of confusion in the London markets between copper shipments from Anaconda in the United States and shipments from the local mine. The name was changed to the Aboriginal name for the area, Eulaminna, in 1907.
