= Kurrajong =

Kurrajong may refer to

- Any of several species of Australian trees in the genus Brachychiton
- Kurrajong, New South Wales, a town in the Blue Mountains
- Kurrajong, Western Australia, a ghost town in Western Australia
- Kurrajong electorate, one of the five electorates for the Australian Capital Territory Legislative Assembly
- The Early Learning Centre at Pulteney Grammar School, South Australia
- Building on Darlinghurst Road, Darlinghurst, built in 1927 and rumoured to have been the first building in Sydney to use reinforced concrete in its construction
