= Acacia balsamea =

Balsam wattle

Scientific classification
- Kingdom: Plantae
- Clade: Tracheophytes
- Clade: Angiosperms
- Clade: Eudicots
- Clade: Rosids
- Order: Fabales
- Family: Fabaceae
- Subfamily: Caesalpinioideae
- Clade: Mimosoid clade
- Genus: Acacia
- Species: A. balsamea

Binomial name
- Acacia balsamea R.S.Cowan & Maslin
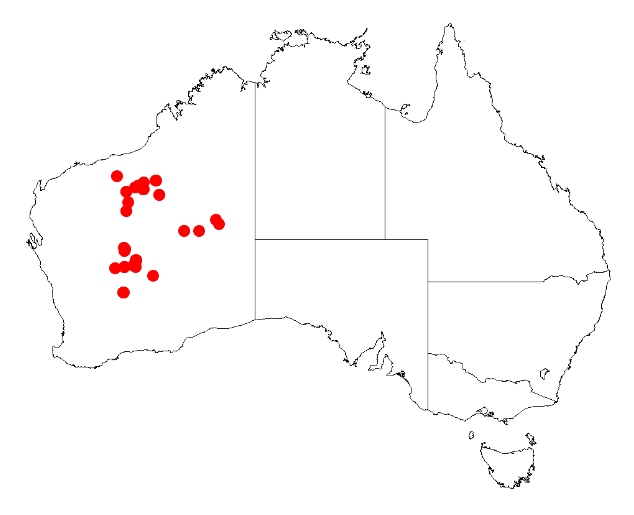
- Acacia balsamea occurrence data from Australasian Virtual Herbarium

Synonyms
- Racosperma balsameum (R.S.Cowan & Maslin) Pedley

Species of shrub

Acacia balsamea, commonly known as balsam wattle, is a species of flowering plant in the family Fabaceae and is endemic to inland areas of Western Australia. It is a bushy, rounded or inverted cone-shaped shrub with flat, linear phyllodes that are circular in cross section, more or less spherical or oblong heads of flowers, and leathery to somewhat woody pods up to 120 mm (4.7 in) long.

== Description ==
Acacia balsamea is a bushy, rounded or inverted cone-shaped shrub that typically grows to a height of 1–4 m (3 ft 3 in – 13 ft 1 in) and has yellow, ribbed branchlets. Its phyllodes are erect, flat, linear, circular in cross section 80–130 mm (3.1–5.1 in) long and 0.8–1.4 mm (0.031–0.055 in) wide, sometimes smelling of Friars' balsam when crushed. The flowers are borne in one or two more or less spherical to oblong heads in axils on a peduncle 5–10 mm (0.20–0.39 in) long, each head with about 21 flowers. Flowering occurs in August and September, and the pods are pendulous, leathery to somewhat woody, resembling a string of beads 85–120 mm (3.3–4.7 in) long and 2–4 mm (0.079–0.157 in) wide. The seeds are dull brown and about 5 mm (0.20 in) long.

== Taxonomy ==
Acacia balsamea was first formally described in 1999 by the botanists Richard Sumner Cowan and Bruce Maslin in the journal Nuytsia from specimens collected by Maslin on Mount William Lambert, east of Wiluna in 1984. The specific epithet (balsamea) refers to the odour of fresh foliage, reminiscent of balsam fir.

== Distribution and habitat ==
Balsam wattle is widely distributed in arid central Western Australia between Nullagine, the south-east part of the Great Sandy Desert, Leinster Downs and the Gibson Desert. It grows in rocky granite soils among stony hills in tall open shrubland and is often associated with Acacia aneura.

== See also ==
- List of Acacia species
