= Minara Station =

Minara Station can refer to:

- Minara Station (Ehime), a railway station in Ehime Prefecture, Japan
- Minara Station (Western Australia), a pastoral lease in Western Australia
