= Senna curvistyla =

Scientific classification
- Kingdom: Plantae
- Clade: Tracheophytes
- Clade: Angiosperms
- Clade: Eudicots
- Clade: Rosids
- Order: Fabales
- Family: Fabaceae
- Subfamily: Caesalpinioideae
- Genus: Senna
- Species: S. curvistyla

Binomial name
- Senna curvistyla (J.M.Black) Randell

Synonyms
- Cassia curvistyla J.M.Black; Cassia curvistylis J.W.Green orth. var.; Cassia oligoclada auct. non F.Muell.: Symon, D.E. (December 1966)

Species of legume

Senna curvistyla is a species of flowering plant in the family Fabaceae and is endemic to north-western Australia. It is an undershrub with pinnate leaves with two or three pairs of narrowly elliptic to elliptic leaflets, the flowers yellow and arranged in groups of two or three, with ten fertile stamens in each flower.

== Description ==
Senna curvistyla is a spreading undershrub that typically grows to a height of 30 cm (12 in) and is softly-hairy apart from the petals and stamens. The leaves are pinnate, 20–30 mm (0.79–1.18 in) long on a petiole 4–6 mm (0.16–0.24 in) long with two or three pairs of narrowly elliptic to elliptic leaflets 5–15 mm (0.20–0.59 in) long, 3–5 mm (0.12–0.20 in) wide and spaced 4–10 mm (0.16–0.39 in) apart. The flowers are yellow and arranged in leaf axils in groups of two or three on a peduncle 10–20 mm (0.39–0.79 in) long, each flower on a pedicel about 2 mm (0.079 in) long. The petals are about 4 mm (0.16 in) long and there are ten fertile stamens, the anthers 4–5 mm (0.16–0.20 in) long. Flowering occurs from January to August, and the fruit is a flat pod 20–25 mm (0.79–0.98 in) long, about 10 mm (0.39 in) wide and straight.

== Taxonomy ==
This species was first formally described in 1938 by John McConnell Black who gave it the name Cassia curvistyla in the Transactions of the Royal Society of South Australia from specimens collected near Yundamindera by John Burton Cleland in 1936. In 1989, Barbara Rae Randell reclassified the species as Senna curvistyla in the Journal of the Adelaide Botanic Garden. The specific epithet (curvistyla) means "curved style".

== Distribution and habitat ==
Senna curvistyla grows in deep, red desert sand in inland northern Western Australia and the Northern Territory.
