= Leinster Downs =

Pastoral lease in Western Australia

Coordinates: 27.848°S 120.608°E

Location in Western Australia

Leinster Downs Station is a pastoral lease that once operated as a cattle station and now operates as a sheep station in Western Australia.

Situated approximately 11 kilometres (7 mi) north of Leinster and 144 kilometres (89 mi) south of Wiluna in the Goldfields–Esperance region, it shares a boundary with the Pinnacles Station to the south and with Wildara station to the south west.

The traditional owners of the area are the Wanmala, Tjupan and Pini peoples.

Leinster Downs was established by Henry Saunders, a mining entrepreneur and member of parliament who acquired the Leinster gold mine in 1900. Established prior to 1909, the property was raising and selling horses in the goldfields area at that time. Cattle were being run at Leinster Downs in 1920 along with many nearby properties including Dandarraga, Sturt Meadows and Ida Valley.

Leinster Downs was acquired by the Nairn brothers, who also owned Yarrabubba Station in about 1925. The property was running sheep at the time and occupied an area of approximately 300,000 acres (121,406 ha). The original brick homestead, which was erected by Saunders, burned down in 1936.

The Leinster Downs Pastoral Company owned the property until 1949, when Noel White and family acquired the property.

== See also ==
- List of ranches and stations
- List of pastoral leases in Western Australia
