= Henry Saunders (politician) =

Australian politician

The Honourable Henry Saunders
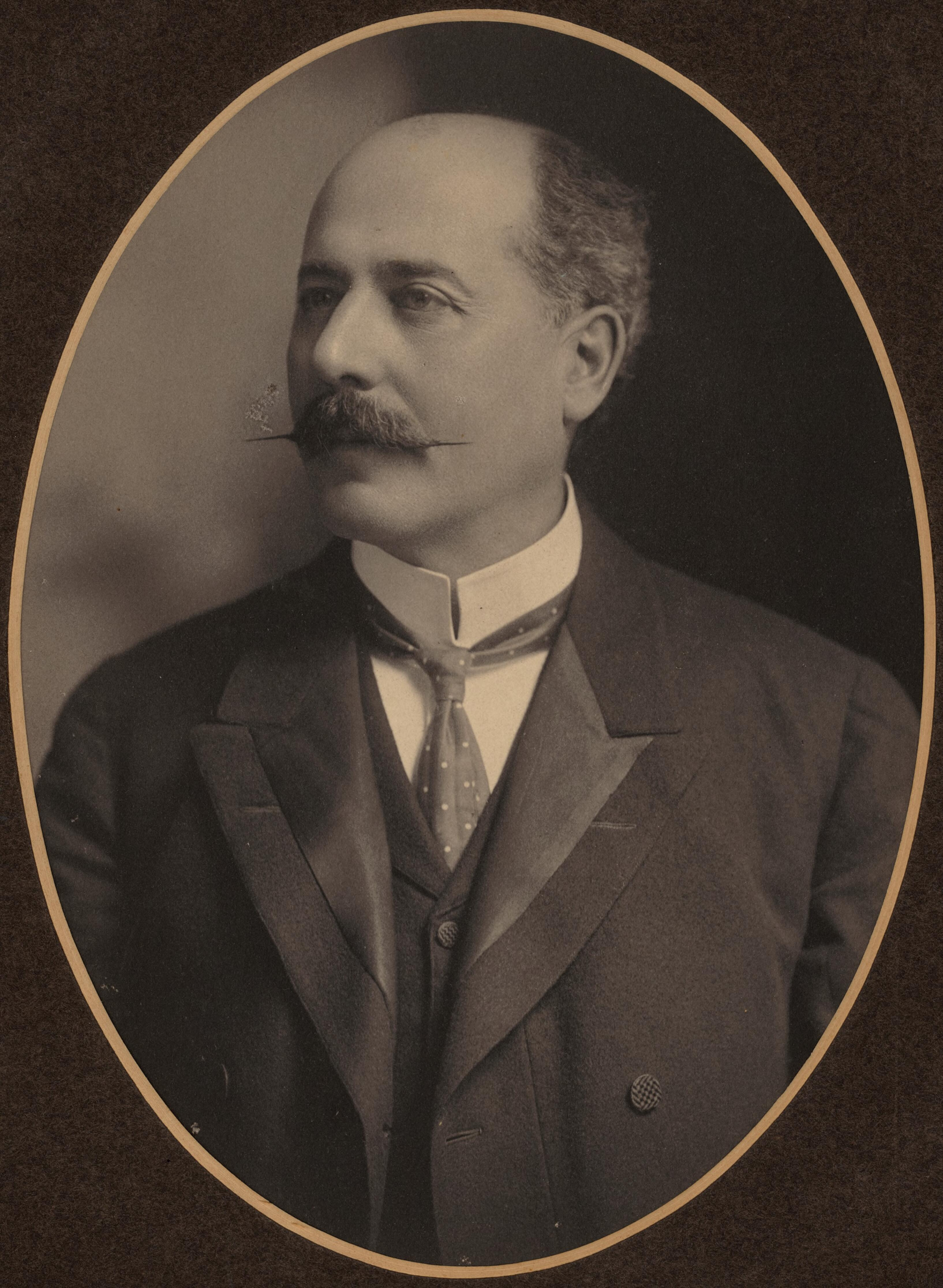

Senator for Western Australia
- In office 20 May 1903 – 31 December 1903
- Preceded by: Norman Ewing

Personal details
- Born: 16 February 1855 London, England
- Died: 13 October 1919 (aged 64) West Perth, Western Australia, Australia
- Party: Free Trade Party
- Occupation: Civil engineer

Henry John Saunders (16 February 1855 – 13 October 1919) was an Australian engineer, businessman and politician. He was a prominent mining entrepreneur during the Western Australian gold rush and served on the Western Australian Legislative Council (1894–1902), as mayor of Perth (1895–1898), and briefly as a Senator for Western Australia (1903).

== Early life ==
Saunders was born on 16 February 1855 in London, England, the son of Thomas Bush Saunders, a barrister and chief magistrate of Bradford-on-Avon, and Maria Albers (née Pedder). He attended Clifton College in Bristol, then trained as a civil engineer.

== Engineering career ==
Saunders immigrated to Western Australia in 1884 and settled in Perth, where he became the chief engineer of the Midland Railway Company. He subsequently went into partnership with James Barratt in the firm of Saunders and Barratt.

In 1887, Saunders and Barratt developed a plan for Perth's first metropolitan water supply scheme. Their proposal envisioned a dam of 140 million gallons on Munday Brook in Canning Mills, connected by a 12-inch pipeline with the reservoir at Mount Eliza feeding in to the Perth townsite and also connecting to Fremantle. Although their proposal was initially rejected by both the Perth and Fremantle local governments, a virtually identical scheme was proceeded with a few years later and resulted in the construction of the Victoria Dam. Saunders had previous experience in hydraulic engineering and chose the design for the dam wall.

== Mining interests ==
During the Western Australian gold rush, Saunders made a fortune as a mining entrepreneur. He floated the West Australian Goldfields Company in London in 1894 which paid a 40 percent dividend in its first year. He was also involved with the Lady Shenton and Florence mines on the Menzies goldfields. In 1900, Saunders acquired the Leinster mine which produced 34,813 ounces of gold over the next seven years. He also acquired pastoral leases around the mine and established Leinster Downs station.

== Politics ==
Saunders was elected to the Perth City Council in 1889 and served as mayor of Perth from 1895 to 1898. He first stood for parliament at the 1890 inaugural election for the Western Australian Legislative Assembly, but was defeated in the seat of East Perth. In 1894 he was elected to the Western Australian Legislative Council to a two-year term in Metropolitan Province. He was re-elected to a six-year term in 1896 but defeated for re-election in 1902.

At the inaugural 1901 federal election, Saunders was an unsuccessful candidate for the Senate in Western Australia. He stood on a platform that included free trade, White Australia, conciliation and arbitration, old-age pensions, and women's suffrage. He placed eighth on the statewide ballot with six seats to fill, and unsuccessfully petitioned for the election of Alec Matheson to be overturned on the grounds of bribery.

On 20 May 1903 he was appointed to the Australian Senate as a Free Trade Senator for Western Australia, filling the casual vacancy caused by the resignation of Senator Norman Ewing. He contested the 1903 election but was unsuccessful. In 1918 he returned to the Legislative Council, but he died in 1919 at St Omer's Private Hospital in West Perth.

== Personal life ==
In 1887, Saunders married Elizabeth Shenton, the daughter of George Shenton Sr. and sister of George Shenton. Their only child died in infancy and he was widowed in 1891. He remarried in 1893 to Julia Parthenia Davey, with whom he had two sons.

From 1895, Saunders lived at Henley Park, a property of 5,400 acres (2,200 ha) on the Swan River north of Guildford. He bred horses, sheep, Ayrshire cattle and pigs, serving as president of the Royal Agricultural Society of Western Australia.

He died on 13 October 1919 at the age of 64 and was interred at Karrakatta Cemetery.
