= George Taylor (Australian politician) =

Australian politician

The Honourable George Taylor
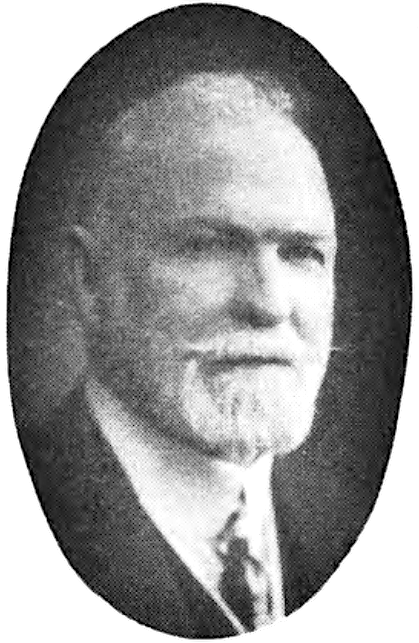

8th Speaker of the Legislative Assembly of Western Australia
- In office 19 July 1917 – 23 July 1924
- Preceded by: James Gardiner
- Succeeded by: Thomas Walker

Member of the Legislative Assembly of Western Australia
- In office 24 April 1901 – 12 April 1930
- Preceded by: None (new seat)
- Succeeded by: None (abolished)
- Constituency: Mount Margaret

Personal details
- Born: 16 May 1861 Campbelltown, New South Wales, Australia
- Died: 24 September 1935 (aged 74) Leederville, Western Australia, Australia
- Party: Labor (to 1917); National Labor (1917–1924); Nationalist (after 1924)

George "Mulga" Taylor (16 May 1861 – 24 September 1935) was an Australian labour leader and politician who was a member of the Legislative Assembly of Western Australia from 1901 to 1930. He was a minister in the government of Henry Daglish, and later served as Speaker of the Legislative Assembly from 1917 to 1924.

== Early life ==
Taylor was born in Campbelltown, New South Wales (on the outskirts of Sydney), to Margaret (née Bourke) and Robert Taylor. He joined a shearing team at the age of 12, and his work as a shearer eventually took him to Queensland, where he became involved with the fledgling labour movement. An organiser of the Queensland Shearers' Union, he was involved with the 1891 shearers' strike, and in its aftermath was among twelve strike leaders convicted of criminal conspiracy. He was sentenced to three years' imprisonment on St Helena Island Prison, but was released early for good behaviour. After his release, Taylor left for Coolgardie, Western Australia, subsequently working as a miner in Erlistoun and Sir Samuel. He maintained his involvement with the labour movement while in the Goldfields, helping to found a local branch of the Amalgamated Workers' Association (a predecessor of the Australian Workers Union).

== Parliamentary career ==
At the 1901 state election, Taylor was elected to the newly created seat of Mount Margaret, which was initially centred around the town of the same name. He had poor relations with many of the seven other Labor MPs who had been elected (including Thomas Bath and William Johnson), and at one stage was briefly expelled from the parliamentary caucus after attacking the party's leader, Robert Hastie. However, Taylor's confrontational attitude cooled once Henry Daglish became leader, and he was appointed Colonial Secretary when Daglish became premier in August 1904. He resigned from the ministry in June 1905 after several differences of opinion with the rest of cabinet, but the Daglish government did not last much longer, losing a confidence motion in August 1905.

From October 1910 to November 1911, Taylor served as chairman of committees in the Legislative Assembly, despite Labor being in opposition at the time. Following the party's 1916 split over the issue of conscription, he joined the newly formed National Labor Party. In July 1917, Taylor was elected Speaker of the Legislative Assembly, having been nominated by the Nationalist premier, Henry Lefroy. He was re-elected to the position after the 1917 state election, at which he also won re-election to his seat under the National Labor banner. The previous speaker, the Country Party's James Gardiner, had been forced to resign due to his hearing loss. Taylor served as speaker until the Coalition government's defeat at the 1924 state election. Shortly after, the National Labor Party was formally merged into the Nationalist Party.

Taylor's seat, Mount Margaret, was abolished in a 1929 redistribution, and at the 1930 state election he attempted to transfer to the seat of Leederville (based in the northern suburbs of Perth). He was unsuccessful, losing to Labor's Alexander Panton, who had previously been the member for Menzies (another abolished Goldfields seat).

== Later life ==
After leaving parliament, Taylor was appointed to the Licensing Court and Licenses Reduction Board, responsible for the issue of liquor licences. He served on the court until his retirement in 1933, and died at his home in Leederville in September 1935, aged 74. Taylor had married the widow Netta Whalan, (a daughter of George Oughton) in 1910, with whom he had one child and also several stepchildren. She predeceased him, dying in June 1933.

Parliament of Western Australia
New seat	Member for Mount Margaret; 1901–1930	Abolished
Preceded by James Gardiner	Speaker of the Legislative Assembly; 1917–1924	Succeeded by Thomas Walker
Political offices
Preceded by Walter Kingsmill	Colonial Secretary; 1904–1905	Succeeded by John Drew
