= Kurrajong, Western Australia =

Abandoned town in Western Australia

Kurrajong
- Town
- Coordinates: 28.711°S 121.102°E
- Country: Australia
- State: Western Australia
- LGA: Shire of Leonora
- Location: 881 km (547 mi) north east of Perth; 28 km (17 mi) NNW of Leonora
- Established: 1899

Government
  - State electorate: Kalgoorlie
  - Federal division: O'Connor
- Elevation: 395 m (1,296 ft)
- Postcode: 6435

Kurrajong is an abandoned town located between Leonora and Leinster along the Old Agnew Road in the Goldfields–Esperance region of Western Australia.

Gold was discovered in the area in 1894 and one of the earliest mines was the Diorite King, which was also used as the town name. The area near the Diorite goldfield was deemed unsuitable for housing due to the uneven terrain, so the townsite was chosen on the flats approximately 3 kilometres (1.9 mi) away. H.S. King surveyed lots in the town in 1897 and the town was gazetted in 1899.

Cobb & Co operated a coach service to Coolgardie from the town in 1898 and opened another to Leonora in 1903. The first hotel licence was issued in 1898 and continued to operate until 1918.

The name of the town is Aboriginal in origin and is the name of a tree that is commonly found in the area.
