= Euro, Western Australia =

Abandoned town in Western Australia

Euro
- Town
- Coordinates: 28.724°S 122.389°E
- Country: Australia
- State: Western Australia
- LGA: Shire of Laverton
- Location: 967 km (601 mi) NNE of Perth; 10 km (6.2 mi) south of Laverton
- Established: 1902

Government
  - State electorate: Kalgoorlie
  - Federal division: O'Connor
- Elevation: 475 m (1,558 ft)
- Postcode: 6440

Euro is an abandoned town in the Goldfields-Esperance region of Western Australia, located about 7 km from Laverton.

The town was named after a gold mine established by North Star Gold Mines Ltd., although Euro is also a name for the common wallaby.
