= Sturt Meadows Station =

Pastoral lease in Western Australia

Coordinates: 28.677°S 120.97°E

Location in Western Australia

Sturt Meadows, or Sturt Meadows Station, is a pastoral lease that once operated as a sheep station but now operates as a cattle station in Western Australia.

== Description ==
The property is located about 42 kilometres (26 mi) north west of Leonora and 89 kilometres (55 mi) south of Leinster in the Goldfields of Western Australia. The station takes its name from the Sturt's desert pea that grows in the area. The property is open country with saltbush and cotton grass studded with white gums and large areas of mulga scrub. Several waterholes are found around the property. The eastern boundary of Sturt Meadows adjoins Tarmoola Station.

== History ==
It was originally acquired by Henry Manuel in 1895. Manuel originally purchased about 160,000 acres (64,750 ha) in the area from Norton and Co. then another 80,900 acres (32,739 ha) from Gardiner and Stewart and later another 300,000 acres (121,406 ha) until the property encompassed over 600,000 acres (242,811 ha). In 1899 Sturt Meadows was stocked with 1,100 sheep, 200 cattle and 50 horses and was thought to be able to carry about 12,000 head of stock. In the same year Mr Barrett-Lennard entered into a partnership with Manuel and took over the management of the property. The stocking rate later the same year had increased to 5,000 sheep and 300 head of cattle.

By 1902 Samuel Phillips had bought into the station in partnership with Manuel. In 1904 it was owned by Forrest, Emanuel and Company and was running 1,000 head of cattle and a flock of about 6,000 sheep.

Sturt Meadows was later acquired by Messrs Kennedy, Brougham and Cropper it was acquired in 1925 by Mr Hawker. The station occupied an area of over 1,000,000 acres (404,686 ha) in 1925. By 1928 it was carrying a flock of 20,000 sheep. In 1949 a total of 16,261 sheep for a total of 502 bales of wool.

The property was owned by Lance and Norma Hurst in 1991. The Hursts were conducting regeneration experiments on the property to assist with land recovery from the effect of rabbits.

The Axford family bought the 400,000-hectare (988,422-acre) station in 2000. It was stocked with 11,000 merino sheep and 158 shorthorn cattle. After suffering problems with feral dog attacks on the sheep that reduced the size of the flock to 600, the Axfords switched to cattle. By 2011 the property was running about 1,700 head of cattle, and was sold to a tuna farmer.

The Axfords were still running the station in 2013.

== See also ==
- List of ranches and stations
