= Yundamindera Station =

Pastoral lease in Western Australia

Coordinates: 29°14′48.64″S 122°06′07.99″E

Location in Western Australia

Yundamindera Station is a pastoral lease and sheep station located about 180 kilometres (112 mi) north of Kalgoorlie in the Goldfields-Esperance region of Western Australia.

It is situated next to the Mount Remarkable sheep station and Mount Celia Station.

Dr Laver leased the 600,000-acre (242,811 ha) station in 1904 and was struck by the similarity of the area to the Barkly Tableland in Queensland. It was the first pastoral pursuit that was established in the area.

The area received 10 inches (254 mm) of rain in 1910, which is well above average, 4 inches (102 mm) of the fall coming in January. This resulted in excellent feed and herbage being available to cattle which thrived in the conditions.

In 1923 Laver sold the leasehold to Mr T. H. Pearse of Gums Station near Burra, South Australia. At the time the station was stocked with approximately 1,400 head of cattle. Pearse also took up the lease of neighbouring Mount Celia Station to have a total holding of about 1,000,000 acres (404,686 ha). Pearse then stocked the station with sheep imported from South Australia, which thrived in the area, resulting in heavy lambing in 1924.

Within a year of fencing the property, over 100 dingoes were killed within the fences, mostly by poisoning. Kangaroos continued to be a problem with the destruction of fences but rabbits were not being reported as a big pest.

Two Aboriginal prospectors tried their luck in an abandoned 9-foot (3 m) shaft located just within the station's gates in 1933. The pair found a formation about 3 feet (1 m) in length and bearing over 1 ounce (28 g) to the ton of gold. The station stockmen often had lunch at the bottom of the shaft to escape the heat of the day.

In 1934 the station secured an additional 101 merino rams bred at the Koonoona stud out of Kooringa.

The area around the station received very heavy rainfall in February 1942 when 490 points or 4.9 inches (124 mm) of rain fell over the course of a week.

A plague of mice swept over the area in 1943 and neighbouring stations reported that it was a full-time job keeping the wells clear, with many being covered in 6 inches (15 cm) of dead and dying mice.

In 1950 the station held about 11,500 sheep and produced a yield of 328 bales of wool.

The station received poor rains in 1952, about half the yearly average of 460 points compared with 887 points.

Over 600 sheep were taken from the station in 1953 and trucked to Cashmere Downs Station, whose manager Mr J. Bradshaw was in the process of restocking.

Yundamindera is currently owned by Minara Resources, along with three other nearby properties: Glenorn, Nambi and Minara Stations. In 2017 Glenorn and Nambi were running approximately 4,000 head of cattle; Yundamindera and Minara are both running approximately 2,500 head of cattle. By 2018 all four stations were successfully running herds of cattle.

== See also ==
- Yundamindera, the nearby ghost town
- List of ranches and stations
