= Minara Station (Western Australia) =

Pastoral lease in Western Australia

Coordinates: 28.921°S 121.798°E

Location in Western Australia

Minara Station is a pastoral lease that has operated as a sheep station and is now a cattle station in Western Australia.

It is situated approximately 46 kilometres (29 mi) east of Leonora and 70 kilometres (43 mi) west of Laverton in the Goldfields-Esperance region.

The station was established prior to 1920, when it was running sheep and owned by Messrs Fawcett and Robinson. By 1924 the owners were Fawcett and Venn.

In 1928 Minara was stocked with 12,000 sheep and the shearing shed was being constructed.

The station is currently owned by Minara Resources along with two other nearby properties: Nambi and Yundamindera.

== See also ==
- List of ranches and stations
- List of pastoral leases in Western Australia
