= Murrin Murrin, Western Australia =

Abandoned town in Western Australia

Murrin Murrin Western Australia
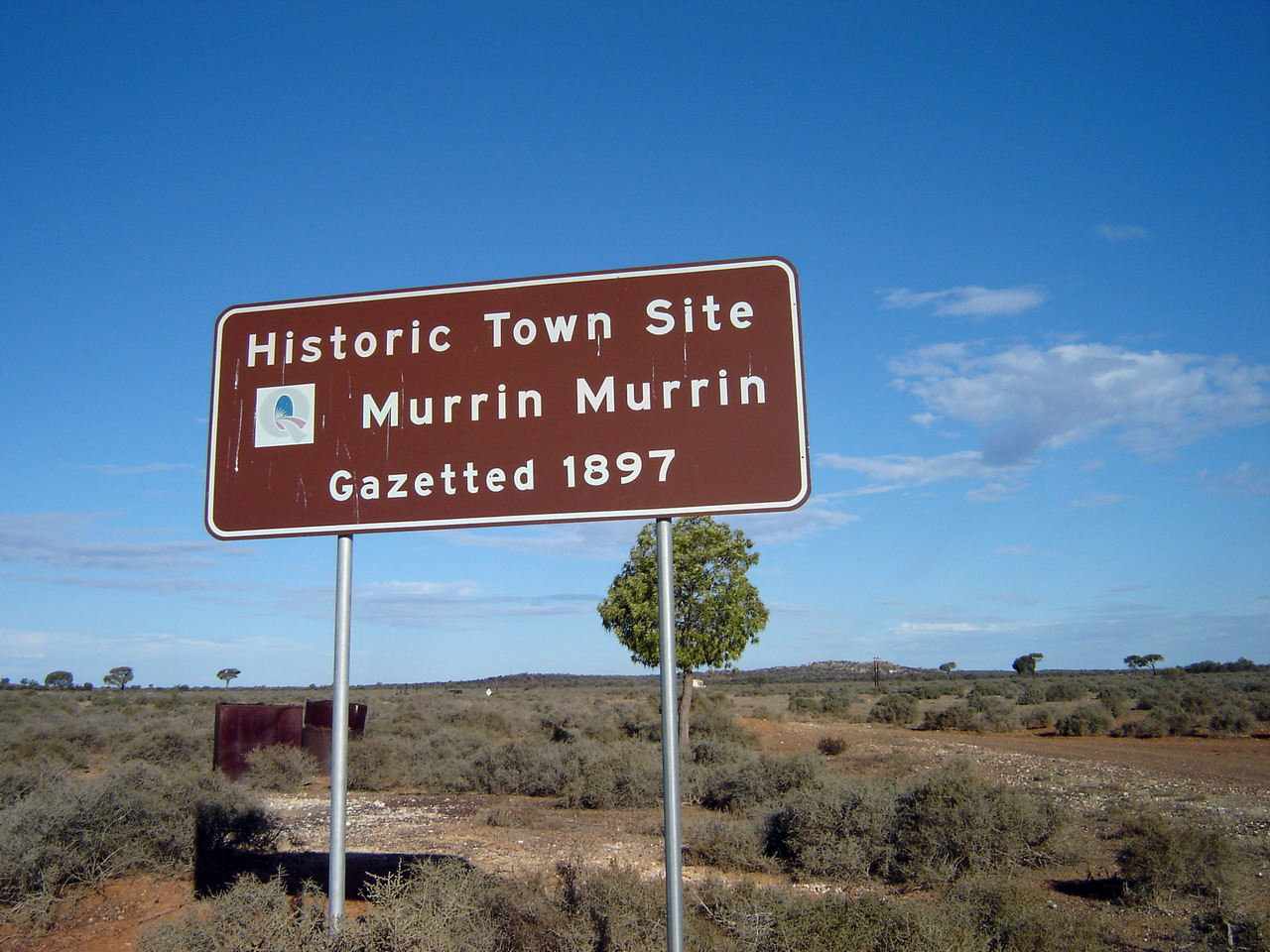
- Sign and ruins of townsite

- Coordinates: 28.92°S 121.82°E
- Established: 1896
- Elevation: 184 m (604 ft)
- Location: 883 km (549 mi) E of Perth; 50 km (31 mi) E of Leonora
- LGA(s): Shire of Leonora
- State electorate(s): Kalgoorlie
- Federal division(s): O'Connor

Murrin Murrin is an abandoned town in Western Australia located 883 km (549 mi) east of Perth, situated along the Old Laverton Road in between Leonora and Laverton in the Goldfields-Esperance region of Western Australia.

The town began as a mining camp, as part of a gold rush, with allotments being made available in 1896. Alfred Edward Morgans, who later became Premier of Western Australia, established a short-lived copper smelter in the area in 1896. Town lots were sold in 1900 but the railway to Leonora, a branch line of the Kalgoorlie to Leonora railway line built in 1905, bypassed the townsite and the railway station was located 2 km (1.2 mi) north of the original townsite. The boundaries of the town were extended in 1906 to the include the railway station. All further development occurred alongside the railway line. A police station was opened in 1905, with building constructed in 1906 and then closed in 1911. The station was then reopened in 1943 and then closed again in 1951.

Murrin is an Indigenous Australian name for a species of Acacia tree that is commonly found in the area.

Nickel was discovered in Kambalda and the nearby Mount Windarra in the 1960s. The giant Murrin Murrin Joint Venture which produces nickel and cobalt is approximately 20 km (12 mi) to the northwest of the abandoned townsite from which it takes its name.
