= Leinster Airport =

- IATA: LER; ICAO: YLST

Summary
- Airport type: Public
- Operator: BHP
- Location: Leinster, Western Australia
- Elevation AMSL: 1,631 ft (497 m)
- Coordinates: 27°50′36″S 120°42′12″E

Map
- Location in Western Australia

Runways
| Direction | Length | | Surface |
| Direction | m | ft | Surface |
|---|---|---|---|
| 10/28 | 1,800 | 5,906 | Asphalt |
- Sources: Australian AIP and aerodrome chart

Leinster Airport (IATA: LER, ICAO: YLST) is an airport in Leinster, Western Australia.

== Airlines and destinations ==
| Airlines | Destinations |
|---|---|
| Alliance Airlines | Charter: Perth |
