= Mount Margaret, Western Australia =

Abhandoned town in Western Australia

Mount Margaret
- Town
- Coordinates: 28°49′0.57″S 122°10′9.96″E
- Country: Australia
- State: Western Australia
- LGA: Shire of Laverton
- Location: 900 km (560 mi) northeast of Perth; 31 km (19 mi) southwest of Laverton, Western Australia
- Established: 1897

Government
  - State electorate: Kalgoorlie
  - Federal division: O'Connor
- Elevation: 418 m (1,371 ft)

Population
  - Total: 79 (2021 census)

Mount Margaret is an abandoned town located 900 kilometres (559 mi) northeast of Perth and 31 kilometres (19 mi) southwest of Laverton in the Goldfields-Esperance region of Western Australia.

The first European to visit the area was government surveyor John Forrest who passed through in 1869 while on an expedition in search of the lost explorer Ludwig Leichhardt. On 25 June he named a nearby hill Mount Margaret after Margaret Elvire Hamersley whom he later married in 1876. The local indigenous name for the hill is Kalgara.

Gold was discovered at the site of the future town in 1893 by prospectors James Ross and Bob McKenzie. The town's main mine was the Mt Morven (formerly the Mt Margaret Reward), situated on the eastern side of the townsite. By 1896 the local progress association began campaigning for the townsite to be declared. By 1897 lots had been surveyed and the townsite was gazetted in the same year.

A police station opened in the town in 1898 but was closed in 1899.

Following a drought in the area in 1921 Rod Schenk established the Mount Margaret Aboriginal Mission in 1922, 3 kilometres (2 mi) to the northeast of the townsite. In 1924 many Aboriginal people were forced to go to nearby Mount Morgans for food following another drought and hostility towards them by local station owners. When the Mount Morgans and Linden food depots were closed in 1927, the Aboriginal peoples moved to the mission at Mount Margaret.

== See also ==
- Electoral district of Mount Margaret
