= Sir Samuel, Western Australia =

Abandoned town in Western Australia

Sir Samuel
- Town
- Interactive map of Sir Samuel
- Coordinates: 27.624°S 120.548°E
- Country: Australia
- State: Western Australia
- LGA: Shire of Leonora
- Location: 1,003 km (623 mi) NE of Perth; 35 km (22 mi) north of Leonora
- Established: 1897

Government
  - State electorate: Kalgoorlie
  - Federal division: O'Connor

Area
  - Total: 3,439.1 km^{2} (1,327.8 sq mi)

Population
  - Total: 35 (SAL 2021)
- Postcode: 6437

Sir Samuel is an abandoned town located between Leinster and Wiluna in the Goldfields-Esperance region of Western Australia.

Gold was discovered in the area in 1895. Officials lobbied for a townsite to be created in 1896 following the realisation that the area was becoming an important mining centre. The mining warden suggested several names but the area was already well known as Mount Sir Samuel so the Mount was dropped and the town became Sir Samuel. The townsite was gazetted in 1897.

The name is derived from the nearby Mount Sir Samuel that was named after Chief Justice and Lieutenant-Governor of South Australia, Sir Samuel James Way by the explorer Lawrence Wells, who was on a surveying expedition in the area in 1892.

A police station camp was opened in the town in 1899, consisting of tents and brush shelters. The camp was burnt down in 1901. Tenders were called to build a new station in 1902; it was completed in 1903 but then closed down in 1910 and the building removed to Youanmi in 1911.

In 1938, an article in the Western Mail estimated that Sir Samuel had a population of 4,000 people at its peak (in about 1908), and included two pubs, three banks, a post office, a school, a rifle range, and a racecourse.
