= Shire of Laverton =

Coordinates: 28°37′41″S 122°24′11″E

- Local government area
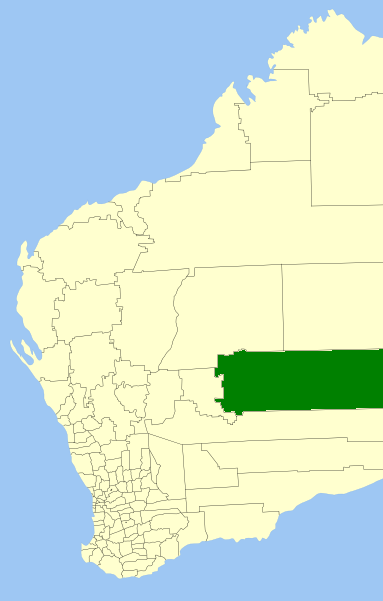
- Location in Western Australia

- Interactive map of Shire of Laverton
- Country: Australia
- State: Western Australia
- Region: Goldfields-Esperance
- Council seat: Laverton

Government
  - Shire President: Patrick Hill
  - State electorate: Kalgoorlie
  - Federal division: O'Connor

Area
  - Total: 179,797.8 km^{2} (69,420.3 sq mi)

Population
  - Total: 1,333 (LGA 2021)
- Website: Shire of Laverton
LGAs around Shire of Laverton
Wiluna	Ngaanyatjarraku	Northern Territory
Leonora	Shire of Laverton	Outback Areas (SA)
Menzies	Menzies	Outback Areas (SA)

The Shire of Laverton is a local government area in the Goldfields-Esperance region of Western Australia, about 370 kilometres (230 mi) northeast of the city of Kalgoorlie and about 950 kilometres (590 mi) east-northeast of the state capital, Perth. The Shire covers an area of 179,798 square kilometres (69,420 sq mi), and its seat of government is the town of Laverton.

== History ==
The Mount Margaret Road District was gazetted on 17 August 1906. It absorbed the Municipality of Mount Morgans on 28 February 1913. On 13 November 1925, it absorbed some land from neighbouring road districts, most notably Lawlers.

It was renamed the Laverton Road District on 20 January 1950. It was made a shire on 1 July 1961 following the passage of the Local Government Act 1960, which reformed all remaining road districts into shires.

The residents of the Shire are represented by 7 Councillors.

== Towns and localities ==
The towns and localities of the Shire of Laverton with population and size figures based on the most recent Australian census:

Suburb	Population	Area	Map
Bandya	275 (SAL 2021)	7,056.8 km^{2} (2,724.6 sq mi)	
Beadell	0 (SAL 2016)	72,937.6 km^{2} (28,161.4 sq mi)	
Cosmo Newbery	143 (SAL 2021)	12,245.8 km^{2} (4,728.1 sq mi)	
Laverton	907 (SAL 2021)	11,482.3 km^{2} (4,433.3 sq mi)	
Lake Wells	0 (SAL 2021)	30,082.6 km^{2} (11,615.0 sq mi)	
Neale	0 (SAL 2016)	45,902.8 km^{2} (17,723.2 sq mi)	

== Ghost towns ==
Ghost towns of the Shire of Laverton:

- Beria
- Burtville
- Duketon
- Euro
- Mount Margaret
- Mount Morgans

== Heritage-listed places ==
As of 2023, 38 places are heritage-listed in the Shire of Laverton, of which two are on the State Register of Heritage Places, the former Hotel Australia and the Mt Margaret Mission Hospital ruin.
