= Shire of Leonora =

Coordinates: 28°53′06″S 121°19′52″E

- Local government area
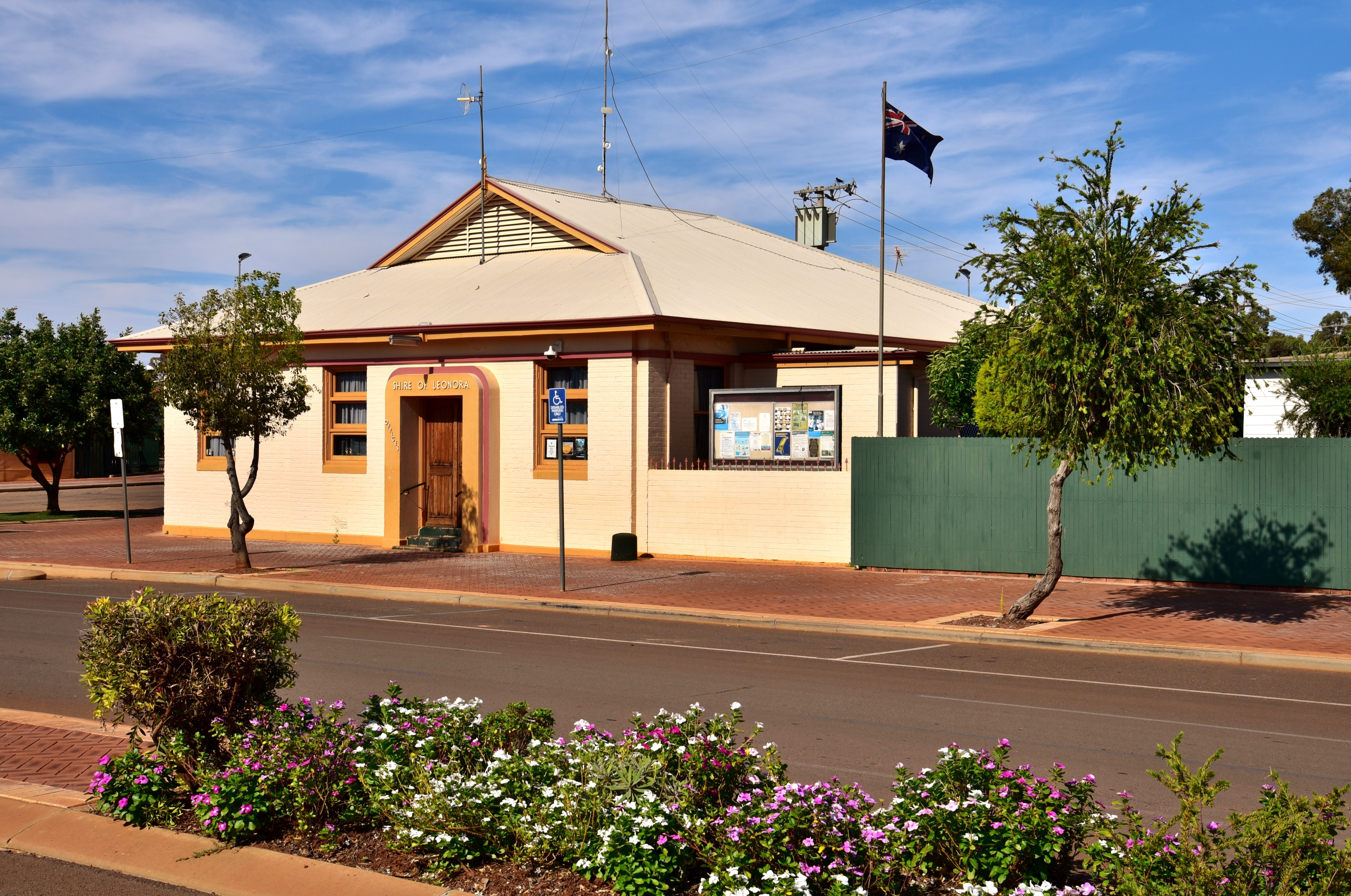
- Leonora shire offices, 2018

- Interactive map of Shire of Leonora
- Country: Australia
- State: Western Australia
- Region: Goldfields-Esperance
- Council seat: Leonora

Government
  - Shire President: Peter Craig
  - State electorate: Kalgoorlie
  - Federal division: O'Connor

Area
  - Total: 32,189.3 km^{2} (12,428.4 sq mi)

Population
  - Total: 1,588 (LGA 2021)
- Website: Shire of Leonora
LGAs around Shire of Leonora
Wiluna	Wiluna	Laverton
Sandstone	Shire of Leonora	Laverton
Menzies	Menzies	Menzies

The Shire of Leonora is a local government area in the Goldfields-Esperance region of Western Australia, about 240 kilometres (150 mi) north of the city of Kalgoorlie and about 830 kilometres (516 mi) northeast of the state capital, Perth. The Shire covers an area of 32,189 square kilometres (12,428 sq mi), and its seat of government is the town of Leonora.

== History ==
Leonora was originally part of the North Coolgardie Road District when that entity was gazetted in 1898. The town of Leonora was gazetted as the Municipality of Leonora with its own mayor in 1900.

The Shire of Leonora originated from the Mount Malcolm Road District, which was established on 31 May 1912, when the North Coolgardie Road District was abolished and broken up into three separate road districts: Mount Malcolm, Kookynie and Menzies. (The North Coolgardie Road District had absorbed three municipalities in March 1912, including the Municipality of Malcolm; however, the amalgamation had not been successful.)

Mount Malcolm absorbed the Municipality of Leonora on 1 July 1917 and became the Leonora-Mount Malcolm Road District.

On 16 August 1929, a neighbouring district, the Lawlers Road District, was dissolved and split between Mount Margaret (later Laverton) and Leonora-Mount Malcolm. The Leonora-Mt-Malcolm Road District was renamed the Leonora Road District on 20 June 1930.

On 1 July 1961, it became the Shire of Leonora under the Local Government Act 1960, which reformed all remaining road districts into shires.

== Wards ==
As of the 2003 election, the Shire is divided into two wards:

- North Ward (four councillors)
- South Ward (five councillors)

From 1979 until 2003, the Shire was divided into Leonora (3), Leinster (4) and Country (2) wards.

== Towns and localities ==
The towns and localities of the Shire of Leonora with population and size figures based on the most recent Australian census:

Suburb	Population	Area	Map
Lake Darlot	178 (SAL 2021)	9,256.7 km^{2} (3,574.0 sq mi)	
Leinster	716 (SAL 2021)	8,151 km^{2} (3,147 sq mi)	
Leonora	657 (SAL 2021)	11,072.4 km^{2} (4,275.1 sq mi)	
Sir Samuel	35 (SAL 2021)	3,439.1 km^{2} (1,327.8 sq mi)	

== Abandoned and ghost towns ==
Abandoned and ghost towns in the Shire of Leonora:

- Agnew
- Eulaminna
- Gwalia
- Kathleen
- Kurrajong
- Lawlers
- Malcolm
- Mertondale
- Murrin Murrin
- Vivien
- Woodarra
- Yundamindera (known as "The Granites")

== Heritage-listed places ==
As of 2023, 95 places are heritage-listed in the Shire of Leonora, of which 47 are on the State Register of Heritage Places, the majority of those around the former mining town of Gwalia.
