= Mount Celia Station =

Pastoral lease in Western Australia

Coordinates: 29°27′35.24″S 122°29′01.01″E

Location in Western Australia

Mount Celia Station is a pastoral lease and sheep station located about 95 kilometres (59 mi) south of Laverton and 100 kilometres (62 mi) east of Kookynie in the Goldfields-Esperance region of Western Australia.

The station has operated since prior to 1898. In December of that year a station employee, William Pead, was attacked by two Aboriginal men. Pead drew his revolver and fired a shot in the air and one of the men threw a waddy at him hitting him in the arm causing him to drop his revolver. The other then threw a spear at him which also hit him in the arm causing Pead to flee.

The owners of the station took each other to court in 1910 over a dispute arising from the sale of the property. The agreement struck in 1905 between Charles Robert Heppingstone and Robert John Stewart regarding the sale of the property including all improvements and stock resulted in Heppingstone suing Stewart for breach of contract. The complicated dispute made it to the Supreme Court and was heard by Justice Rooth. Rooth found in favour of Stewart, but described both of the men as being "questionable witnesses".

In 1923 the station was sold to Mr T. H. Pearse of Gums Station near Burra, South Australia. Pearse also took up the lease of neighbouring Yundamindera Station to have a total holding of about 1,000,000 acres (404,686 ha). Pearse then stocked the station with sheep imported from South Australia, which thrived in the area, resulting in heavy lambing in 1924.

The station was placed on the market again by the Yundamindera Pastoral Company in 1925. It was put up for auction in Perth; the 330,000-acre (133,546 ha) property had a lease that would expire in 1948. No bids were placed on the property.

== See also ==
- List of ranches and stations
