= Mount Morgans, Western Australia =

Abandoned town in Western Australia

Mount Morgans
- Town
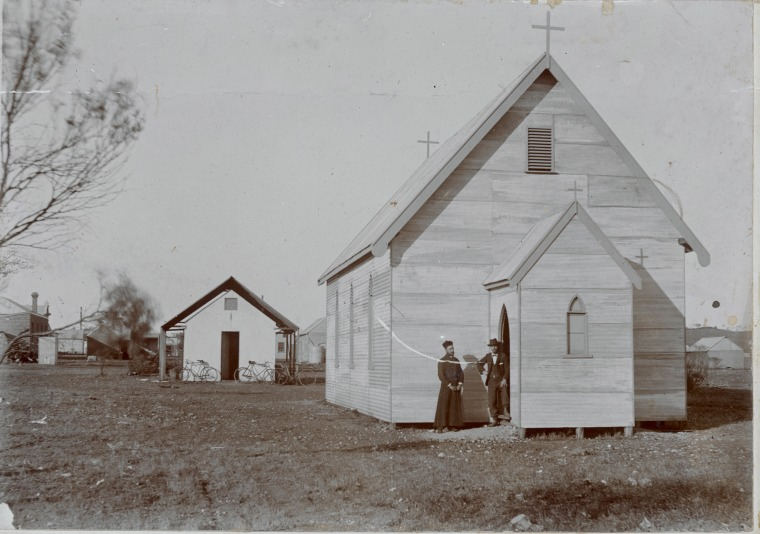
- Photo of Saint Mathias Church of England at Mount Morgans in 1900

- Coordinates: 28°46′08″S 122°03′41″E
- Country: Australia
- State: Western Australia
- LGA: Shire of Laverton
- Location: 916 km (569 mi) northeast of Perth; 40 km (25 mi) southwest of Laverton, Western Australia
- Established: 1896

Government
  - State electorate: Kalgoorlie
  - Federal division: O'Connor
- Elevation: 432 m (1,417 ft)
- Postcode: 6440
- Gazetted: 1899

Mount Morgans, known as Mount Morgan until 1899, is an abandoned town in Western Australia 900 kilometres (559 mi) northeast of Perth and 40 kilometres (25 mi) southwest of Laverton on the original Malcolm-Laverton Road, in the Goldfields-Esperance region of Western Australia.

== History ==
The first Europeans to visit the area were the party of government surveyor John Forrest who passed through in 1869 while on an expedition in search of the lost explorer Ludwig Leichhardt. Forrest named a nearby hill Mount Morgan after the expedition's cook and shoeing smith, probation prisoner David Morgan. Morgan had arrived in Western Australia as a transported convict on Belgravia on 4 July 1866.

The first gold was discovered in the Mount Morgan area in 1894, with a reward claim granted to prospectors Harry Swincer and Norman Sligo in December of that year. Gold was discovered near the future townsite in 1896 by prospectors Harry Lilley and Samuel McInness. A claim was registered at Menzies on 15 June 1896. The lease was sold in 1897 to Westralia Mount Morgan Gold Mines, Limited whose directors included Alexander Forrest (chairman), Sir James Lee Steere and engineer Alf Morgans, and which was developed as the Westralia Mount Morgan Mine. The Mount Morgans Gold Mine produced gold during the periods 1896–1952, 1988–1997, 2010–2011, and 2017–2020.

The townsite was selected by the mining warden in March 1899, and surveyed in July 1899. Public comment on the use of the name Mount Morgan for the town included "... something might be done to relieve the monotony of the duplication of this title throughout the colonies...", due to the pre-existence of Mount Morgan, Queensland and Mount Morgan near Widgiemooltha, Western Australia. During 1899 the settlement was occasionally promoted as Morgansville, after Alf Morgans MLA. It was gazetted as Mount Morgans on 29 December 1899. A police station was established in 1899 when the population was 500. By 1903 the population had reached 1,250 with over 500 buildings situated in the town. The town boasted six hotels, a hospital, a miners' union hall, two general stores and two chemists, as well as a timber Church (St Mathias C of E). The police station closed in 1928 then reopened in 1935 then closed again for the final time in 1937. The town was in deep decline in 1937 with a visiting police commissioner announcing the town was dead in July of the same year.

At its peak the town took up an area of 1,112 acres (450 ha).
