= Mount Morgans Gold Mine =

Gold mine in Western Australia

Mount Morgans
- Location in Western Australia
- Interactive map of Mount Morgans
- Location: Laverton, Western Australia, Australia; 28°48′26″S 122°12′08″E
- Products: Gold
- Production: 90,809 ounces
- Financial year: 2021–22
- Company: Genesis Minerals Limited
- Website: genesisminerals.com.au
- Acquired: 2012

The Mount Morgans Gold Mine is a gold mine located 37 km west-southwest of Laverton, Western Australia.

The Mt Morgans mine was owned and operated by Dacian Gold Limited, who acquired the project in 2012; Dacian Gold and thereby the mine was subsequently acquired by Genesis Minerals Limited in November 2023.

== History ==
Gold mines in the Leonora region

Gold was discovered at Mount Morgans in 1896 and, up until 1952, 328,000 ounces of gold at 15 g/t were produced, mostly in underground mining at the Westralia deposit. Alf Morgans, later to become Premier of Western Australia for just 32 days, was responsible for the development of the Mount Morgans mineral field.

In a second activities period, from 1988 to 1997, the mine produced 917,000 ounces at 3.2 g/t, now mostly from open pit operations. Mining at Mount Morgans ceased in 1998. The processing plant of the mine was later removed.

The current site, was originally owned by Plutonic Resources, a major Australian gold mining and exploration company. Homestake Mining Company purchased Plutonic in April 1998 for more than $1.0 billion, and, in turn, Homestake was acquired by Barrick Gold at the end of 2001. Barrick then sold the mine to Range River Gold in May 2009.

After the purchase of the mine, Range River concentrated its efforts at the deposits of The Craic and Transvaal. Range River Gold went into voluntary administration in April 2011. The project was then purchased by a private entity from the administrators that listed as Dacian Gold Limited on the ASX in November 2012.

Dacian Gold commenced construction of a new process facility at the Mount Morgans mine in 2017, investing A$200 million in the process. The project was completed in 2018 and a first gold pour was announced in early April that year. The new mining area and process plant, 28 km south-west of Laverton, is located approximately 15km south-east of the original mine and plant, which was located 37km west-south-west of Laverton.

In June 2022, operations at the mine were suspended, with the company citing cost explosions and a tight labour market as some of the reasons. Dacian Gold and thereby the mine was subsequently acquired by Genesis Minerals Limited in November 2023.

== Production ==
Annual production of the mine:

Year	Production	Grade	Cost per ounce
2020–21	106,919 ounces		A$1,556
2021–22	90,809 ounces		A$1,955
