= Lawlers, Western Australia =

Ghost town in Western Australia

Lawlers
- Town
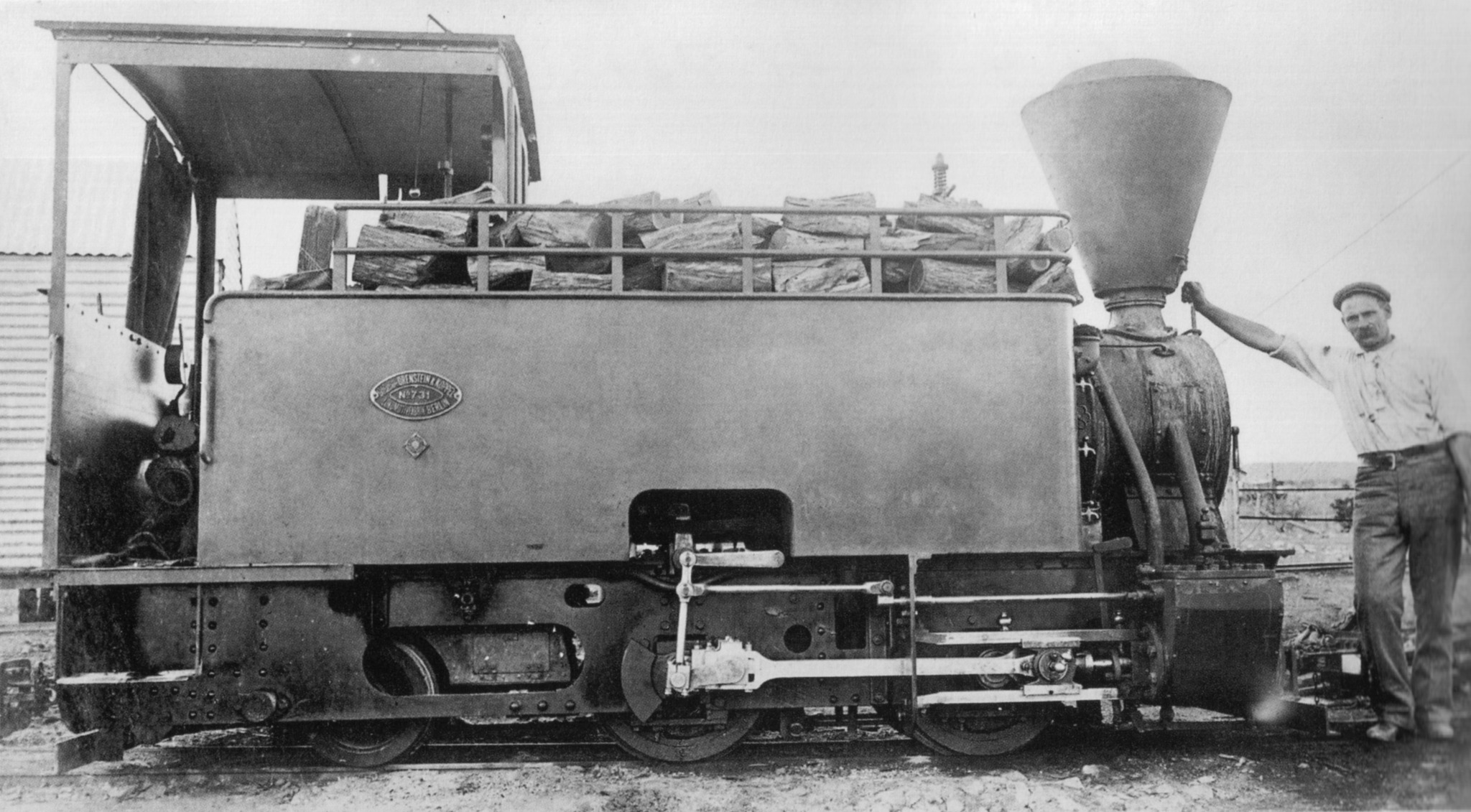
- O&K locomotive N° 731 of 1902, 610mm, 0-4-2T, 40hp, East Murchison United Ltd, Lawlers, WA

- Coordinates: 28.05°S 120.31°E
- Country: Australia
- State: Western Australia
- LGA: Shire of Leonora
- Location: 982 km (610 mi) north east of Perth, Western Australia; 32 km (20 mi) south west of Leinster
- Established: 1896

Government
  - State electorate: Kalgoorlie
  - Federal division: O'Connor
- Elevation: 482 m (1,581 ft)
- Postcode: 6437

Lawlers is a ghost town on the Old Agnew Road, 982 kilometres (610 mi) northeast of Perth, Western Australia, in the Shire of Leonora in the Goldfields-Esperance region of Western Australia.

Gold was discovered in the area by Anderson, Hall and Heffernan, a party of prospectors that left Cue in 1892. Patrick Lawler and his party arrived in 1893 and had little success, until they left and returned in 1894.

The townsite was surveyed and gazetted in 1896 and named after Patrick Lawler. A ten stamp battery was established about 4.5 kilometres (3 mi) northwest of town in 1899, on a five-acre (two-hectare) lease. A police station/courthouse was built the same year; it was closed in 1927, reopened in 1938, then closed permanently in 1950. In 1996, it was used as an office by the gold mining company Plutonic Resources.

At its peak, Lawlers was the state's third-largest town, with a population of 8,000. It had a separate local government area (the Lawlers Road Board) until 1929, when it was divided between the Leonora-Mount Malcolm and Mount Margaret Road Boards.

== Notable residents ==
- Dan Mackinnon, a prominent pastoralist, was chairman of the Lawlers Road Board from 1928 to 1929.
- Charles Maley, a future state MP, managed a brewery in Lawlers in the early 1900s, and also served on the Lawlers Road Board.
- Emil Nulsen, another future state MP, was secretary of the Lawlers branch of the Australian Workers' Union in the late 1900s.
