= Leinster, Western Australia =

Town in the Goldfields-Esperance region of Western Australia

Leinster
- Town
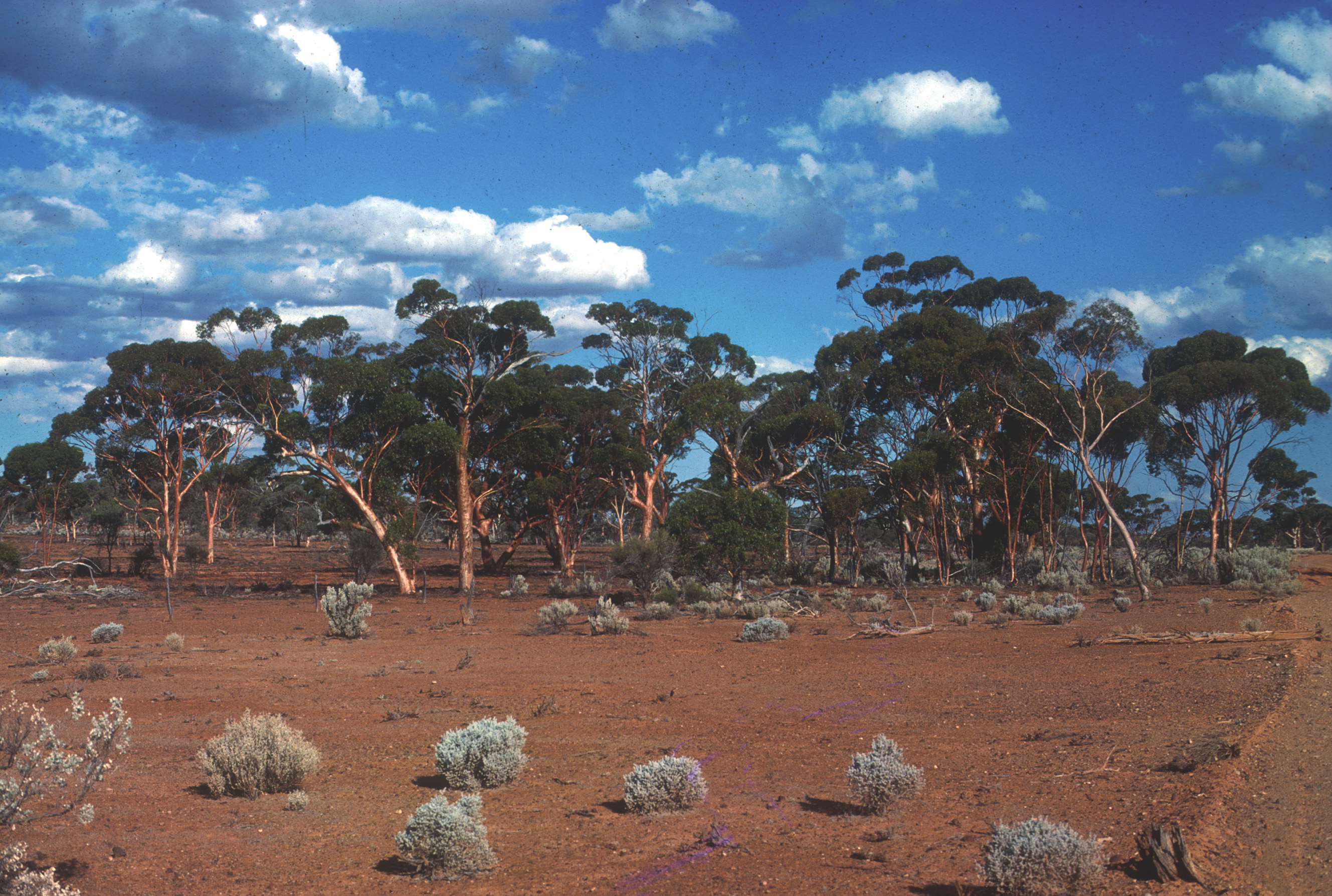
- Site of the Agnew Nickel mine before open-pit mining began

- Interactive map of Leinster
- Coordinates: 27°54′43″S 120°41′49″E
- Country: Australia
- State: Western Australia
- LGA: Shire of Leonora
- Location: 968 km (601 mi) NE of Perth; 373 km (232 mi) N of Kalgoorlie, Western Australia
- Established: 1976

Government
  - State electorate: Kalgoorlie
  - Federal division: O'Connor

Area
  - Total: 8,151 km^{2} (3,147 sq mi)
- Elevation: 497 m (1,631 ft)

Population
  - Total: 395 (UCL 2021)
- Postcode: 6437
- Mean max temp: 28.4 °C (83.1 °F)
- Mean min temp: 14.8 °C (58.6 °F)
- Annual rainfall: 245.1 mm (9.65 in)

Leinster is a town in the northern Goldfields area of Western Australia. It is 4 km (2.5 mi) east of the Goldfields Highway in the Shire of Leonora, and 968 km (601 mi) northeast of the state capital, Perth.

The town was established in 1976 by Agnew Mining, initially as a dormitory town for miners working in the nearby Perseverance and Rockys Reward nickel mines, now the Leinster Nickel Mine, and Agnew gold mines, now the Agnew Gold Mine. It was named for the nearby Leinster Downs station. Facilities at Leinster include a supermarket, service station, community school, day care centre, medical centre and tavern. Sporting facilities include an indoor sports centre, a 50 m (160 ft) Olympic sized pool and a baby pool, squash courts, BMX track, football and cricket oval, and an 18-hole golf course. The school is an independent public school for students up to year 12.

The Leinster Nickel Operation is part of the BHP's Nickel West business group. As at 2006, the operation employed 992 workers and produced 40,000–45,000 t (88×10^{6}–99×10^{6} lb) of nickel in concentrate per year. Leinster Airport was built adjacent to the mine.

Apart from the nickel operations, gold was mined 41 km (25 mi) south-east of Leinster, at the Thunderbox Gold Mine, from 2002 to 2007 and again since 2016.

== Geography ==
=== Climate ===
Leinster has a subtropical desert climate (Köppen: BWh) with very hot, slightly wetter summers and mild, very dry winters. Extreme temperatures ranged from 47.8 °C (118.0 °F) on 8 January 2013 to −1.6 °C (29.1 °F) on 15 July 1999. The wettest recorded day was 23 February 2001 with 94.0 mm (3.70 in) of rainfall.

Climate data for Leinster Aero (27.84°S 120.70°E) (497 m (1,631 ft) AMSL) (1942-2025)
Month	Jan	Feb	Mar	Apr	May	Jun	Jul	Aug	Sep	Oct	Nov	Dec	Year
Record high °C (°F)	47.8 (118.0)	46.9 (116.4)	43.3 (109.9)	39.7 (103.5)	35.3 (95.5)	29.2 (84.6)	29.8 (85.6)	33.7 (92.7)	37.9 (100.2)	40.2 (104.4)	44.3 (111.7)	45.8 (114.4)	47.8 (118.0)
Mean daily maximum °C (°F)	37.4 (99.3)	35.7 (96.3)	32.2 (90.0)	28.0 (82.4)	23.3 (73.9)	19.3 (66.7)	19.0 (66.2)	21.9 (71.4)	25.8 (78.4)	30.0 (86.0)	32.8 (91.0)	35.9 (96.6)	28.4 (83.2)
Mean daily minimum °C (°F)	23.3 (73.9)	22.3 (72.1)	19.4 (66.9)	15.4 (59.7)	10.4 (50.7)	7.3 (45.1)	6.2 (43.2)	7.9 (46.2)	10.9 (51.6)	15.0 (59.0)	18.4 (65.1)	21.5 (70.7)	14.8 (58.7)
Record low °C (°F)	12.5 (54.5)	13.5 (56.3)	8.7 (47.7)	5.3 (41.5)	1.4 (34.5)	−0.4 (31.3)	−1.6 (29.1)	−0.4 (31.3)	1.4 (34.5)	2.8 (37.0)	7.9 (46.2)	12.5 (54.5)	−1.6 (29.1)
Average precipitation mm (inches)	39.3 (1.55)	39.8 (1.57)	35.1 (1.38)	23.5 (0.93)	13.3 (0.52)	14.1 (0.56)	14.8 (0.58)	8.6 (0.34)	4.1 (0.16)	11.1 (0.44)	17.1 (0.67)	24.1 (0.95)	245.1 (9.65)
Average precipitation days (≥ 0.2 mm)	5.1	5.6	5.8	4.6	4.0	4.8	4.6	3.7	2.2	2.8	4.3	3.9	51.4
Average afternoon relative humidity (%)	20	27	28	34	34	40	38	28	22	18	19	18	27
Average dew point °C (°F)	5.5 (41.9)	8.5 (47.3)	7.4 (45.3)	7.4 (45.3)	4.7 (40.5)	3.3 (37.9)	1.9 (35.4)	−0.5 (31.1)	−0.4 (31.3)	−0.3 (31.5)	1.8 (35.2)	3.5 (38.3)	3.6 (38.4)
Source: Bureau of Meteorology (1994-2025)
