= Leonora, Western Australia =

Town in Western Australia

Leonora
- Town
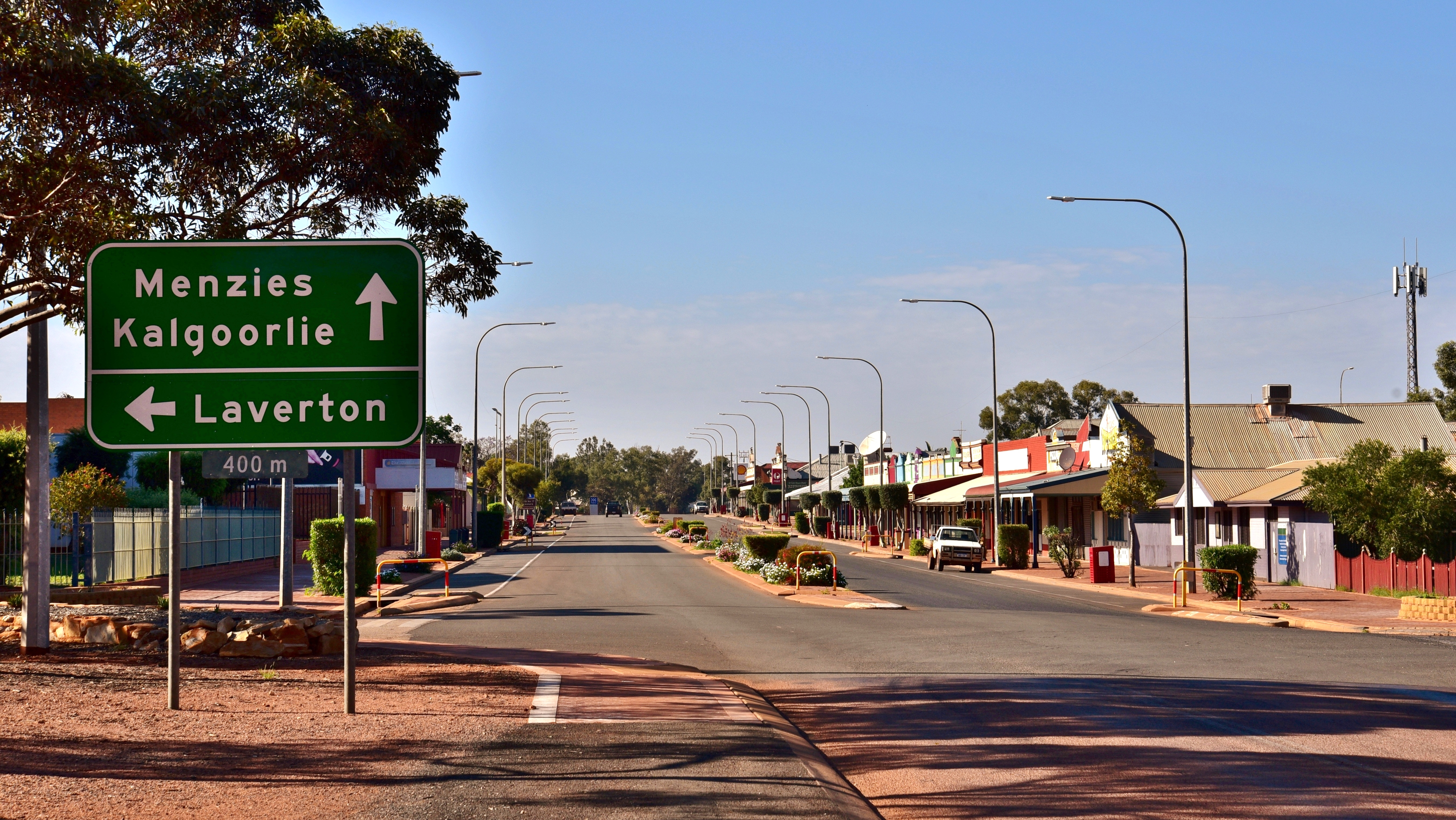
- Tower Street, Leonora

- Interactive map of Leonora
- Coordinates: 28°53′04″S 121°19′51″E
- Country: Australia
- State: Western Australia
- LGA: Shire of Leonora
- Location: 833 km (518 mi) NE of Perth; 237 km (147 mi) N of Kalgoorlie; 124 km (77 mi) NNW of Leinster
- Established: 1897

Government
  - State electorate: Kalgoorlie
  - Federal division: O'Connor

Area
  - Total: 11,072.4 km^{2} (4,275.1 sq mi)
- Elevation: 376 m (1,234 ft)

Population
  - Total: 567 (UCL 2021)
- Postcode: 6438
- Mean max temp: 27.9 °C (82.2 °F)
- Mean min temp: 13.9 °C (57.0 °F)
- Annual rainfall: 234.5 mm (9.23 in)

Leonora is a town in the Goldfields–Esperance region of Western Australia, located 833 kilometres (518 mi) northeast of the state capital, Perth, and 237 kilometres (147 mi) north of the city of Kalgoorlie.

== History ==
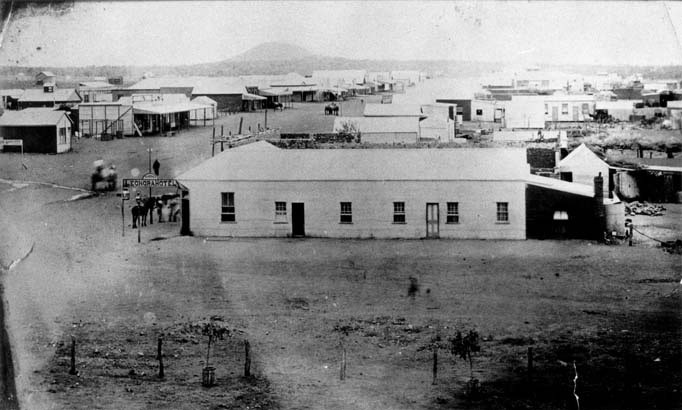
Leonora in 1899

The first European explorer to visit the area was John Forrest in 1869. On 21 June 1869 Forrest's party made camp near a conspicuous hill, which Forrest named Mount Leonora, after his six-year-old niece Frances (Fanny) Leonora Hardey. In 1895, gold was discovered in the area by prospector Edward "Doodah" Sullivan at the Johannesburg lease just north of the current townsite. In the following two years a number of rich finds resulted in rapid development of the area. The Sons of Gwalia gold mine brought Leonora to the attention of the world. By 1897 a residential and business area had been established, and the town was gazetted as Leonora.

Leonora is the terminus of the Kalgoorlie to Leonora railway line, which opened in 1903.

Leonora had a single track passenger tramway linking the town and nearby Gwalia, from 1901 to 1921. Initially steam driven, the service was electric from November 1908, and petrol powered from 1915.

A reverse osmosis desalination treatment plant was opened in October 2005 to improve the quality of the town's water supply from the Station Creek wellfield by reducing the naturally occurring high levels of salinity, nitrate and hardness. It was designed to supply 2.5 million litres (660 thousand US gallons) of treated water per day.

In 2010, the Rudd government relocated asylum seekers from Christmas Island to the "Leonora Alternative Place of Detention", an immigration detention centre, previously used as a mine workers hostel, in Leonora. The Abbott government closed the facility in February 2014.

== Economy ==
Leonora is primarily a mining town. There are a number of major gold mines in the shire, as well as the Murrin Murrin laterite nickel project. The area supports a significant pastoral industry.

== Demographics ==
At the 2021 census, Leonora had a population of 567, 19.6% of whom were of Aboriginal descent.

== Climate ==
The area has an arid climate (BWh), with very hot summers and cool winters. Frost may occur occasionally on some winter mornings. Rainfall is very sparse.

Climate data for Leonora
Month	Jan	Feb	Mar	Apr	May	Jun	Jul	Aug	Sep	Oct	Nov	Dec	Year
Record high °C (°F)	49.0 (120.2)	46.7 (116.1)	45.2 (113.4)	41.7 (107.1)	35.6 (96.1)	30.2 (86.4)	28.9 (84.0)	33.0 (91.4)	37.7 (99.9)	40.8 (105.4)	44.4 (111.9)	47.8 (118.0)	49.0 (120.2)
Mean daily maximum °C (°F)	37.0 (98.6)	35.3 (95.5)	32.6 (90.7)	27.9 (82.2)	22.8 (73.0)	19.0 (66.2)	18.4 (65.1)	20.7 (69.3)	24.9 (76.8)	28.9 (84.0)	32.3 (90.1)	35.3 (95.5)	27.9 (82.2)
Mean daily minimum °C (°F)	21.8 (71.2)	20.9 (69.6)	18.6 (65.5)	14.8 (58.6)	10.2 (50.4)	7.3 (45.1)	6.1 (43.0)	7.0 (44.6)	10.0 (50.0)	13.7 (56.7)	17.0 (62.6)	20.0 (68.0)	14.0 (57.2)
Record low °C (°F)	12.6 (54.7)	10.6 (51.1)	8.4 (47.1)	3.1 (37.6)	0.7 (33.3)	−2.8 (27.0)	−1.7 (28.9)	0.3 (32.5)	1.8 (35.2)	3.6 (38.5)	4.0 (39.2)	9.5 (49.1)	−2.8 (27.0)
Average precipitation mm (inches)	26.3 (1.04)	31.2 (1.23)	29.0 (1.14)	20.4 (0.80)	23.9 (0.94)	25.0 (0.98)	18.8 (0.74)	15.9 (0.63)	9.0 (0.35)	9.5 (0.37)	12.4 (0.49)	16.8 (0.66)	236.4 (9.31)
Average precipitation days	3.4	3.6	3.9	3.5	4.3	5.4	5.2	3.9	2.6	2.5	2.9	3.2	44.4
Average relative humidity (%)	21	27	28	34	39	45	43	36	28	22	21	20	30

== See also ==
- Leonora Airport
