= Goldfields–Esperance =

Region of Western Australia

Coordinates: 31°S 123°E

- Region
- Interactive map of Goldfields–Esperance
- Country: Australia
- State: Western Australia
- LGA: List; Shire of Coolgardie; Shire of Dundas; Shire of Esperance; City of Kalgoorlie–Boulder; Shire of Laverton; Shire of Leonora; Shire of Menzies; Shire of Ngaanyatjarraku; Shire of Ravensthorpe; Shire of Wiluna

Government
  - State electorates: Kalgoorlie; North West Central; Roe
  - Federal division: O'Connor

The Goldfields–Esperance region is one of the nine regions of Western Australia. It is located in the south-eastern corner of Western Australia, and comprises the local government areas of Coolgardie, Dundas, Esperance, Kalgoorlie–Boulder, Laverton, Leonora, Menzies, Ngaanyatjarraku, Ravensthorpe and Wiluna.

It also incorporates the area along the Great Australian Bight to the South Australian border known as the Nullarbor Plain.

== Geography ==
The Goldfields–Esperance region is the largest of Western Australia's regions, with an area of 955,276 km^{2} (368,834 sq mi). It is mostly a low and flat plateau of extremely ancient Precambrian rocks that have been stable since long before the Paleozoic Era. Because of the extreme geological stability and the absence of glaciation since the Carboniferous, the soils are extremely infertile and generally quite saline. Consequently, the region supports the lowest stocking rates in the world: it is considered that one sheep per square mile is the maximum sustainable rate except in the small wetter area near Esperance. There are no rivers; any rainfall that is not absorbed by the dense rooting systems of the native flora percolates to form extremely saline groundwater, which is very frequently too salty even for adult sheep.

In the 1890s the goldfields term was used for country between Southern Cross and Coolgardie; however, as the gold fields extended to Kalgoorlie and beyond, the term Eastern Goldfields was used for the locations in the vicinity of Kalgoorlie at that stage.

The Little Sandy Desert and the Gibson Desert are found in the northern part of the region, with the Great Victoria Desert in the south east.

== Climate ==
The climate is mostly hot and dry. Annual rainfall is typically around 250 millimetres (10 in) per year and can be very variable, except in the small area near Esperance and Cape Arid National Park where reliable winter rainfall can give annual totals as high as 635 mm (25 inches) falling mainly in the winter months. Most rainfall is produced by thunderstorms in spring or summer or by cloudbands from the northwest in autumn and winter, but sometimes cyclones from the Pilbara decay into rain depressions and produce heavy rainfall.

== Population ==
The region has a population of just under 60,000 people, about half of whom live in the City of Kalgoorlie–Boulder. Another quarter live in the Shire of Esperance, and the remaining shires are very sparsely populated. Nearly 10% of the region's population are of Aboriginal descent, which is substantially higher than the state as a whole.

== Economy ==
The economy of the Goldfields sub-region is based on the extraction and processing of various mineral resources, primarily gold and nickel. In 2012 the mining of gold, nickel and platinum yielded just under $9 billion, equivalent to $11.34 billion in 2022.

Pastoralism in the northern goldfields commenced in the early 1900s with Yundamindera Station being established by Dr. Laver. In 1923 Yundmindera was purchased along with Mount Celia Station with a combined area of over 1,000,000 acres (4,047 km^{2}) by T. H. Pearse, who stocked the property with sheep. Between 1925 and 1928 more eastern states pastoralists established scores of leases, and over £1.5 million (roughly $136.46 million in 2022), was invested in properties in the northern and eastern goldfields. In three months of 1925 over 40,000 sheep were railed to the area and in one month of 1927 seven trains carrying sheep arrived. By 1934 the goldfields were stocked with over 500,000 sheep and 25,000 cattle. Shearing the same year produced approximately 11,667 bales of wool valued at £243,600, roughly $27.02 million in 2022.

Further south near Esperance, the economy is based on agriculture, with wheat, canola and barley widely grown and making up about 80% of the area's agricultural economy. These crops require huge inputs of fertilisers because of the sandy nature of the soils and are a major threat to the region's great plant diversity. In 2021–22, the Esperance zone harvested 3.55 million tonnes (7.8 billion pounds) of grain. Pastoralism is also common, with both sheep and cattle stations being common in the area. Along the coast fishing and aquaculture are common, with fisheries for abalone, pilchards and sharks.

Air travel to and from the region is served by Kalgoorlie–Boulder Airport which provides daily regular flights to Perth operated by Qantas and Virgin Australia.

== See also ==
- Goldfields–Esperance historical timeline
