= China–South Africa relations =

- China: South Africa

Diplomatic mission
- Embassy of China, Pretoria: Embassy of South Africa, Beijing

Envoy
- Ambassador Chen Xiaodong: Ambassador Siyabonga Cwele

The People's Republic of China (PRC) established diplomatic relations with Republic of South Africa (RSA) in January 1998. South Africa is one of the African countries that China most prioritizes within Chinese-African foreign relations. In 2010, China was South Africa's largest trading partner. Since 2007, China-South African relations have become increasingly close with increasing trade, policy and political ties. In the 2010 Beijing Declaration, South Africa was upgraded to the diplomatic status of Strategic Comprehensive Partner by the Chinese government. South Africa increasingly votes in alignment with China in the United Nations.

== Recognition ==
Official relations between the PRC and South Africa were established on January 1, 1998. The dismantling of the apartheid regime in South Africa and the fall of the Soviet Union in the early 1990s opened up the possibility of official relations being established between the PRC and South Africa. Before the 1990s South Africa had a close official relationship with the government in Taiwan for strategic and economic reasons.

Prior to the establishment of full diplomatic relations, South Africa and the People's Republic of China established "cultural centres" in Beijing and Pretoria, known as the South African Centre for Chinese Studies and the Chinese Centre for South African Studies respectively. Although the Centres, each headed by a Director, did not use diplomatic titles, national flags, or coats of arms, their staff used diplomatic passports and were issued with diplomatic identity documents, while their vehicles had diplomatic number plates. They also performed visa and consular services.

The handover of Hong Kong to the PRC in 1997 was a factor in the switch in official recognition, as South Africa had strong trade links with the territory, then under British administration. Pretoria was concerned that after the handover, Beijing might downgrade its consulate and the country would no longer be allowed to use Hong Kong as a transit route for air traffic and trade. In addition, key South African politicians and government officials in the post-apartheid government, most notably the Communist Party of South Africa, lobbied strongly in support of shifting recognition to the PRC.

However, Taiwan lobbied hard for continued South African recognition and initiated an expensive public relations drive to convince members of the anti-apartheid government. Then President Nelson Mandela argued in favour of a 'Two Chinas' policy that was incompatible with the Beijing's One China principle.

After many years of strong lobbying and engagement with Mandela in November 1996 the South African government announced that it would switch recognition from Taiwan to the PRC in January 1998. A visit by Taipei's Foreign Minister John Chiang to meet with Alfred Nzo and attempt to salvage the situation produced no results, and so Taipei's ambassador to Pretoria Gene Loh was recalled on 6 December 1996. South Africa has since followed the one China principle.

== Economics ==
Countries which signed cooperation documents related to the Belt and Road Initiative

In 1992, trade between China and South Africa amounted to US$14 million, but by the time the two countries had established relations in 1998, this had swelled to US$1.4 billion. By 2010 trade between the two countries had increased to US$25.6 billion with imports from South Africa reaching US$14.8 billion. Cross country investment had grown to US$7 billion in the same year. Most South African exports to China in 2010 were primary products. Two-way trade between China and South Africa reached US$60.3 billion by 2014.

As China began a new town construction boom around 2010, the Chinese government and state-owned enterprises began developing new towns with African governments, including South Africa.

In December 2010, South Africa was invited to join China in BRICS group of emerging economies. With the invitation, it was expected that South Africa would expand its trade relations with other BRIC countries, including China. Some see the BRICS relationship as potentially competing with South Africa's relations with the IBSA Dialogue Forum. In July 2010, the South African publication Business Day reported that 45% of SABMiller's growth would come from its China operations by 2014. The anomalous growth of South African media company Naspers in 2009 was largely owed to its stake in the Chinese company Tencent.

South Africa joined the Belt and Road Initiative (BRI) in 2015.

In December 2015 the two countries signed twenty-five agreements worth a combined value of US$16.5 billion at an event at the Forum on China-Africa Cooperation (FOCAC) Business Forum held in South Africa and attended by about 400 business people from both countries. At the same event, the two countries discussed economic priority such as the "alignment of industries to accelerate South Africa's industrialisation process; enhancement of cooperation in Special Economic Zones (SEZs); marine cooperation; infrastructure development, human resources cooperation; and financial cooperation."

As of 2015/16 there were over 140 medium-sized or large Chinese companies in South Africa with a combined investment of US$13 billion, employing around 30,000 South Africans. Significant investments by Chinese firms in South Africa include the China First Automotive assembly plant in Coega Industrial Park, a Hisense Group white goods factory, and a Hebei Jidong Development Group cement plant.

Increasingly the South African government, inspired by China's success in reducing poverty and promoting economic growth, is looking to China for policy ideas and inspiration in its efforts at promoting growth.

In 2024, South Africa imposed anti-dumping tariffs on structural steel from China. In March 2026, South Africa increased those tariffs.

=== Loans ===
In 2020 South Africa was estimated to owe the equivalent of 4% of its annual GDP to Chinese lenders.

In July 2018, China announced to invest $15 billion in South Africa's economy which included loans for power utilities and infrastructure. Chinese loans to South African power utility Eskom have proven controversial amidst accusations that it was an example of debt-trap diplomacy by China. In 2018 an additional R370 billion (US$25.8 billion) loan from the China Development Bank was issued to the South African government as part of an economic stimulus package. The size of loan and the lack of public information about it was controversial and criticized by opposition parties as a possibly pushing South Africa into a "debt trap".

== Chinese development finance to South Africa ==
From 2000 to 2011, there are approximately 37 Chinese official development finance projects identified in South Africa through various media reports. These projects range from a financial cooperation agreement worth of $2.5 US billion between the Development Bank of South Africa and the China Development Bank, to an investment of $877 million by China's state-owned miner Jinchuan and China Development Bank in South Africa's platinum industry, and an investment of US$250 million by China's Huaqiang Holdings in a theme park in Johannesburg.

== Visits ==
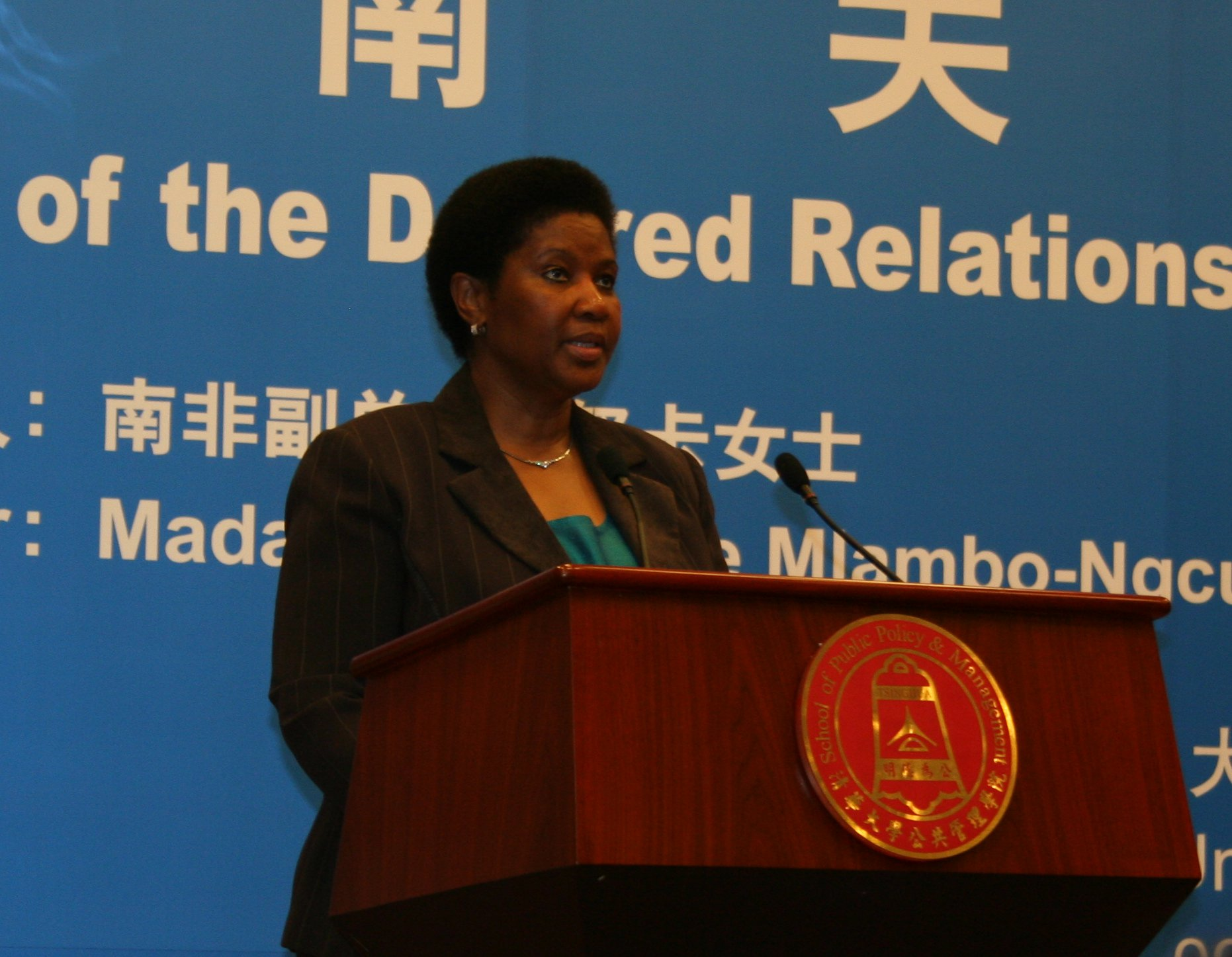
South African former Deputy President Phumzile Mlambo-Ngcuka giving a speech at Tsinghua University's School of Public Policy and Management on China-South African relations in 2007

In the early nineties, before South Africa officially recognised the PRC, Chinese Foreign Minister and CCP Politburo member Qian Qichen (钱其琛) paid an unofficial and very quiet visit to South Africa to meet senior government ministers and inspect possible future embassy sites. Then South African Minister for Foreign Relations, Pik Botha, interrupted his participation in the CODESA talks to have the first high-level meeting between South Africa and the PRC. In October 1991 a South African delegation including Pik Botha went to Beijing to meet Qian Qichen.

In September 2007 then South African Deputy President Phumzile Mlambo-Ngcuka visited Beijing and met with General Secretary of the Chinese Communist Party Hu Jintao (胡锦涛). After which she gave a speech at Tsinghua University on building China-South African relations.

China-South African relations expanded significantly in 2010 following a number of high-level official visits and exchanges by officials from both countries. In late March 2010 CPPCC Chairman Jia Qinglin (贾庆林) visited South Africa and met with South Africa's President Jacob Zuma and signed contracts worth more than US$300 million.

In August 2010 President Jacob Zuma led a South African delegation of 17 cabinet members and 300 businesspeople to China where they signed the Beijing Declaration on the Establishment of a Comprehensive Strategic Partnership Between the People's Republic of China and the Republic of South Africa. This was followed by a visit to China by speaker of the National Assembly of South Africa Max Sisulu in October 2010. In November 2010 Chinese Vice President Xi Jinping (习近平) travelled to South Africa to meet with South African Vice President Motlanthe and signed bilateral cooperation agreements in energy, trade statistics, banking regulation and other areas. His visit was followed by an official goodwill visit to South Africa by China's top legislator Wu Bangguo (吴邦国) in May 2011 as part of his Africa-Asia tour which included Namibia and Angola.

In late September 2011 South African Vice President Motlanthe lead a trade delegation to Beijing at the invitation of Chinese Vice President Xi. During the visit the China Development Bank and the Development Bank of South Africa signed a US$2.5 billion agreement. The two countries also signed a Memorandum of Understanding on geological exploration and mineral resources.

On the 17 July 2012 President Zuma led a South African delegation that included International Relations Minister Maite Nkoana-Mashabane, Minister in the Presidency Collins Chabane and Trade and Industry Minister Rob Davies to attend the fifth Forum on China-Africa Co-operation (FOCAC) in Beijing.

The emergence of China as a power among others gives or offers an opportunity to African countries to be able to free themselves from the shackles that are really colonially designed

- Jacob Zuma, speaking at Tsinghua University, 2014

In December 2014 President Zuma led another delegation of South African government ministers and a 100 representatives of South African business to China representing a further consolidation of warm South African-China relations. From the South African side trade imbalances, China's impact on South African industry, and concerns over China's influence over South Africa's domestic and international affairs remain issues of concern for bilateral relations. In July 2015 South Africa's deputy president, Cyril Ramaphosa, led a trade and economic delegation to China.

In September 2015 President Zuma attended the Chinese 70th anniversary celebrations since the end of World War II. This was closely followed by a visit from, now General Secretary of the Chinese Communist Party, Xi Jinping to Pretoria, South Africa on December 2, 2015, where agreements to finalise the China-South Africa 5-10 Year Framework on Cooperation were signed.

The administration of Cyril Ramaphosa saw an expansion of China-South African warm relations with implementation of joint naval exercises with Chinese and Russian naval vessels off the coast of Cape Town in November 2019.

In August 2023, Chinese President Xi Jinping visited South Africa for a summit of the BRICS-bloc.

== Politics ==
After the post-apartheid establishment of bilateral relations, China began building support form South Africa for the creation of the Forum on China-Africa Cooperation in 2000. During the 2000s, party-to-party exchanges between the Chinese Communist Party (CCP) and the African National Congress (ANC) and South African Communist Party significantly expanded. The ANC was one of six African ruling parties that supported the Mwalimu Julius Nyerere Leadership School, which opened in February 2022 in Tanzania, financed by the Central Party School of the Chinese Communist Party.

It has been alleged that South Africa's ruling political party, the African National Congress, has received funding for election campaigns from foreign countries particularity for the 2009 national elections. Amongst the foreign countries accused of giving money to the ANC is the CCP. Other countries and the ruling political parties and figures accused of giving money to the ANC include the Congress Party of India, the Gaddafi administration of Libya and Equatorial Guinea.

In 2014 it was announced that the Chinese Communist Party will support and construct a political training school for South Africa's ruling political party the ANC in Venterskroon. An increasing number of South African government functionaries are being sent to Chinese government schools in Beijing. South Africa plans to send increasing numbers of executives from South African Parastatals to study China's relationship with its State Owned Enterprises. A number of analysts such as Patrick Heller, have argued that South Africa's ruling ANC sees the Chinese Communist Party as a model for maintaining control over the country as a de facto One-party state and/or as an aspect of anti-Western feeling by South African government elites.

=== Dalai Lama and Tibet ===
The Dalai Lama visited South Africa in 1996, meeting then-president Nelson Mandela. In March 2009 the Dalai Lama was refused entry to South Africa, officially to keep Tibetan politics from overshadowing the 2010 FIFA World Cup. The refusal to allow the Dalai Lama to visit South Africa sparked a political debate within South Africa about the country's political and business interests with China, with some accusing the government of "selling out" sovereignty, and others pointing out the negative consequences to China-French business relations after French president Nicolas Sarkozy met with the Dalai Lama.

In 2011 the Dalai Lama was invited to attend and give a lecture at the 80th birthday of Desmond Tutu in October. The Dalai Lama's staff accused the South African government of delaying consideration of his visa application because of Chinese pressure, but the government denied such pressure and counteraccused the Dalai Lama of not submitting any visa applications. Three days before Tutu's birthday the Dalai Lama announced that he would not attend the event as he did not expect to be granted a visa. Tutu responded by calling the ANC government "worse than the apartheid government" and suggested that the government should be toppled in the style of the Arab Spring. The Dalai Lama joined Tutu on his birthday by videoconferencing, calling China a country "built on lies" and "run by hypocrites", and implored Tutu to continue inviting him to South Africa to "test [South Africa's] government". Opposition and COSATU politicians again accused the ANC government of "betraying South Africa's sovereignty and Constitution." Others in South Africa argued that the Dalai Lama's physical nonattendance was ultimately in South Africa's interests, reasoning that "it's easier to Skype in the Dalai Lama than [to find] billions in alternative investments."

Dalai Lama was again unable to enter South Africa when he was invited to attend the Nobel Peace Laureates world summit in October 2014. It is alleged by the mayor of Cape Town that he was asked by national government to withdraw his application for a visa to visit SA for reasons “in the national interest” so as to avoid embarrassment by his visa being officially rejected.

The 2018 visit to South Africa of President in exile of Tibet, Lobsang Sangay, strained relations as the South African government refused Chinese demands to expel Sangay despite threats that the visit might impact Chinese investment into South Africa.

== Space cooperation ==
In 2017, the South African National Space Agency (SANSA) joined the BRICS space program, of which the China National Space Administration is also a member.

In 2021, SANSA signed a memorandum of understanding with the China Satellite Network Office to collaborate on satellite navigation and strengthen exchanges.

China built and operates a satellite data receiving station in South Africa.

== Chinese South Africans ==
Chinese South Africans are an ethnic group of Chinese diaspora in South Africa. They and their ancestors immigrated to South Africa beginning during the Dutch colonial era in the Cape Colony. Since 2000 an estimated 350,000 Chinese immigrations, most of whom came from mainland China, have settled in South Africa. South Africa has the largest African-born population of Chinese of any country on the continent.

== Other events ==
=== Pelindaba nuclear research centre ===
In 2007, the People's Republic of China dispatched two armed teams to break into the Pelindaba nuclear research centre to steal technology for a pebble bed modular reactor, according to South Africa's State Security Agency. A guard at the reactor was shot in the chest during the break-in.

=== Illegal fishing ===
In May 2016, the South African Department of Fisheries stated that a total of nine Chinese owned vessels were spotted in South African waters allegedly engaged in illegal fishing. The vessels initially agreed to be escorted into port for inspection but on the way broke up and evaded the escorting South African patrol vessel. The nine vessels were part of a fleet of 28 Chinese trawlers that were accused by local anglers of illegal fishing within 3 kilometers of South African waters allegedly fishing the annual sardine run.

=== Irregular tenders to Gupta family ===
In June 2016 the state owned Chinese locomotive manufacturer, CSR Corporation Limited, was implicated in a 2012 R51 billion (US$6 billion) tender to deliver 600 locomotives to the state owned Passenger Rail Agency of South Africa. It was later reported that the future South African Public Protector Busisiwe Mkhwebane was allegedly implicated in the deal when she worked as Counselor Immigration and Civic Services in South Africa's embassy in China. By 2020 it was reported that funds allocated to pay for an adjusted contract to deliver the locomotives produced by CSR Corporation, now reformed and renamed CRRC, had been frozen by the South African Revenue Service due to possible instances of corruption paid to associates of the Gupta family to secure the contract.

== Extradition ==
China has an extradition treaty with South Africa.

== Public opinion ==
A survey published in 2026 by the Pew Research Center found that 52% of South Africans had a favorable view of China, while 38% had an unfavorable view. It also found that 59% of South Africans in the 18-35 age group had positive opinions of China.

== Resident diplomatic missions ==
of China in South Africa

- Pretoria (Embassy)
- Cape Town (Consulate-General)
- Durban (Consulate-General)
- Johannesburg (Consulate-General)

of South Africa in China

- Beijing (Embassy)
- Hong Kong (Consulate-General)
- Shanghai (Consulate-General)

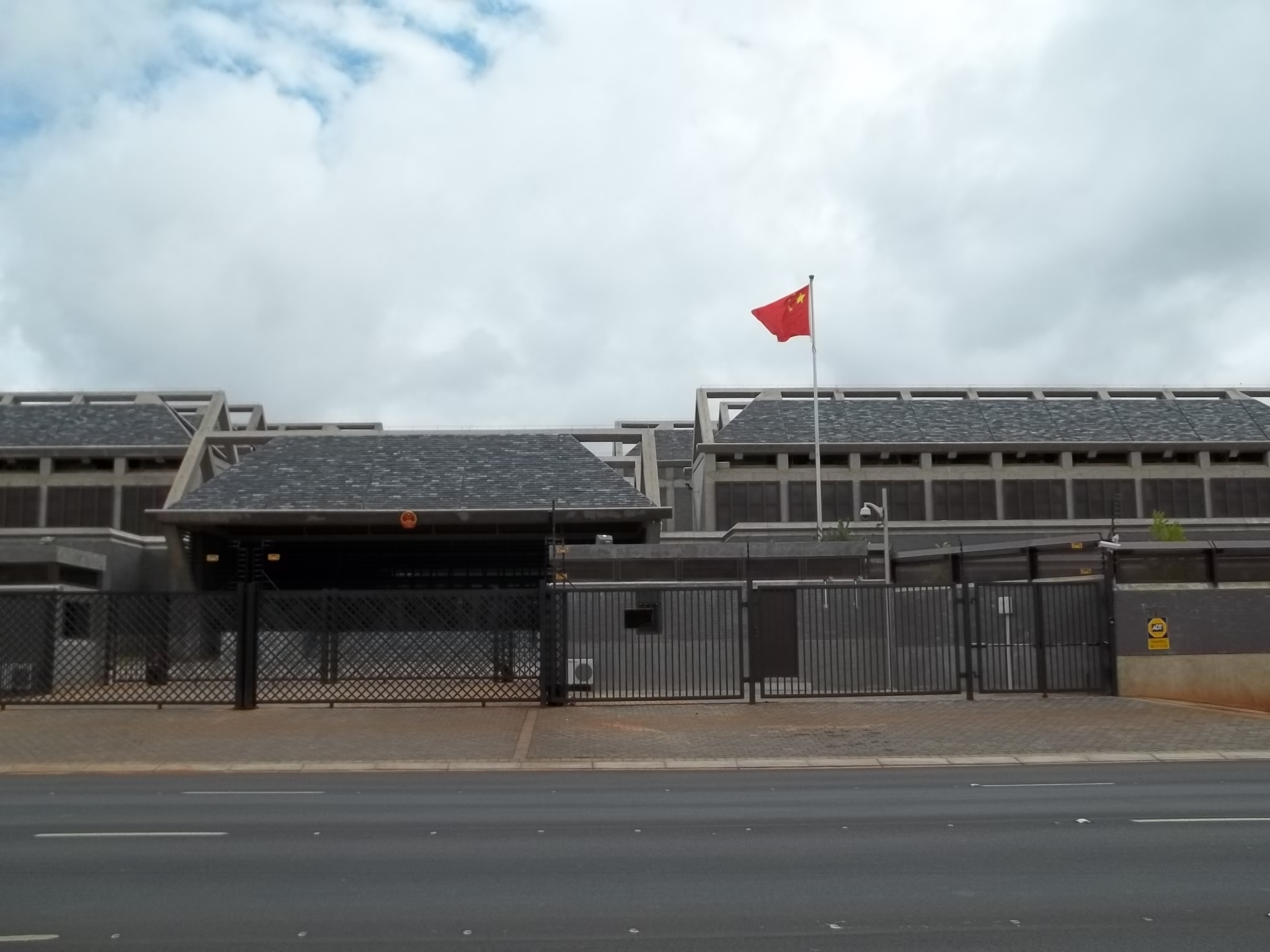
Embassy of China in Pretoria

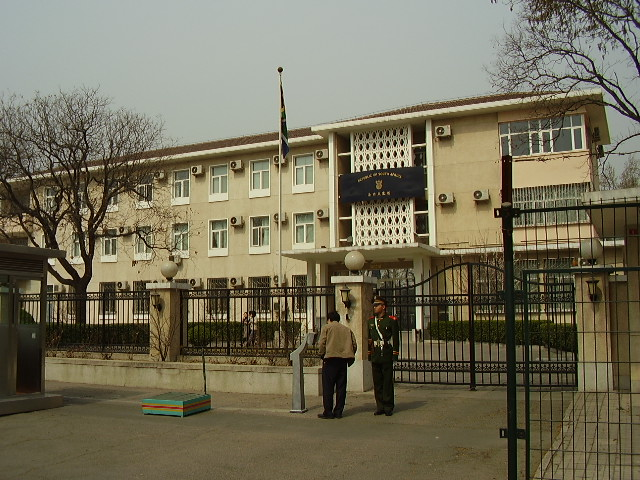
Embassy of South Africa in Beijing

== See also ==
- Foreign relations of China
- Foreign relations of South Africa

== Bibliography ==
- Cardenal, Juan Pablo; Araújo, Heriberto (2011). La silenciosa conquista china (in Spanish). Barcelona: Crítica. pp. 51–54, 91, 115, 137. ISBN 9788498922578.
