= Vredefort impact structure =

Largest verified impact structure on Earth

- Vredefort Dome
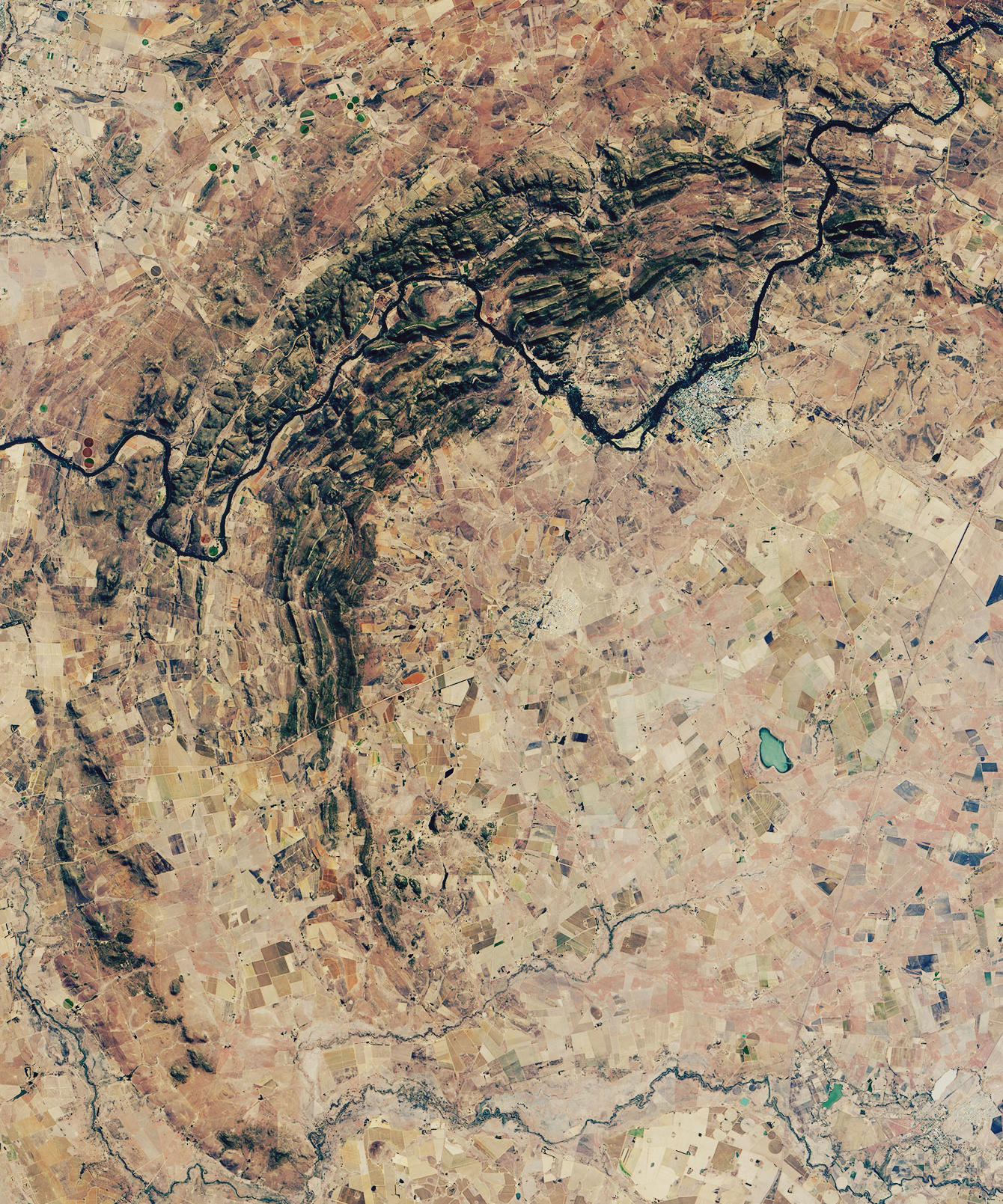
- Vredefort Dome (centre), with the Vaal river running across it; seen from space with the Operational Land Imager on Landsat 8, 27 June 2018

- Location within South Africa
- Location: Free State, South Africa; 27°0′0″S 27°30′0″E

Impact crater structure
- Confidence: Confirmed
- Diameter: 170–300 km (110–190 mi) (estimated former crater diameter)
- Age: 2023 Ma ± 4 Ma; Orosirian, Paleoproterozoic
- Exposed: Yes
- Drilled: Yes

UNESCO World Heritage Site
- Official name: Vredefort Dome
- Includes: 1. Vredefort Dome core area 2. The stromatolite/basal fault plane site 3. The chocolate tablet breccia site 4. The pseudotachylite (quarry) site
- Criteria: Natural: (viii)
- Reference: 1162
- Inscription: 2005 (29th Session)
- Area: 30,000 ha (120 sq mi)

The Vredefort impact structure is one of the largest impact structures on Earth. The crater, which has since been worn away, has been estimated at 170–300 kilometres (110–190 mi) across when it was formed, the latter estimate suggesting the initial crater was larger than Chicxulub crater, the largest mostly intact impact crater on Earth.

The remaining structure, comprising the deformed underlying bedrock, is located in present-day Free State province of South Africa. It is named after the town of Vredefort, near its centre. The structure's central uplift is known as the Vredefort Dome, which is around 100–120 kilometres (62–75 mi) in diameter. The impact structure was formed during the Paleoproterozoic Era, 2.023 billion (± 4 million) years ago. It is among the oldest known impact structures on Earth, after Yarrabubba (2.23 billion years old) and possibly Miralga.

The structure's extraterrestrial origin was established in 1961 after the location of shatter cones by American geologists Robert S. Dietz and Robert B. Hargraves, though an impact was proposed as early as 1937 by Claude C. Albritton and John D. Boon. In 2005, the Vredefort Dome was added to the list of UNESCO World Heritage Sites for its geologic interest.

== Formation and structure ==
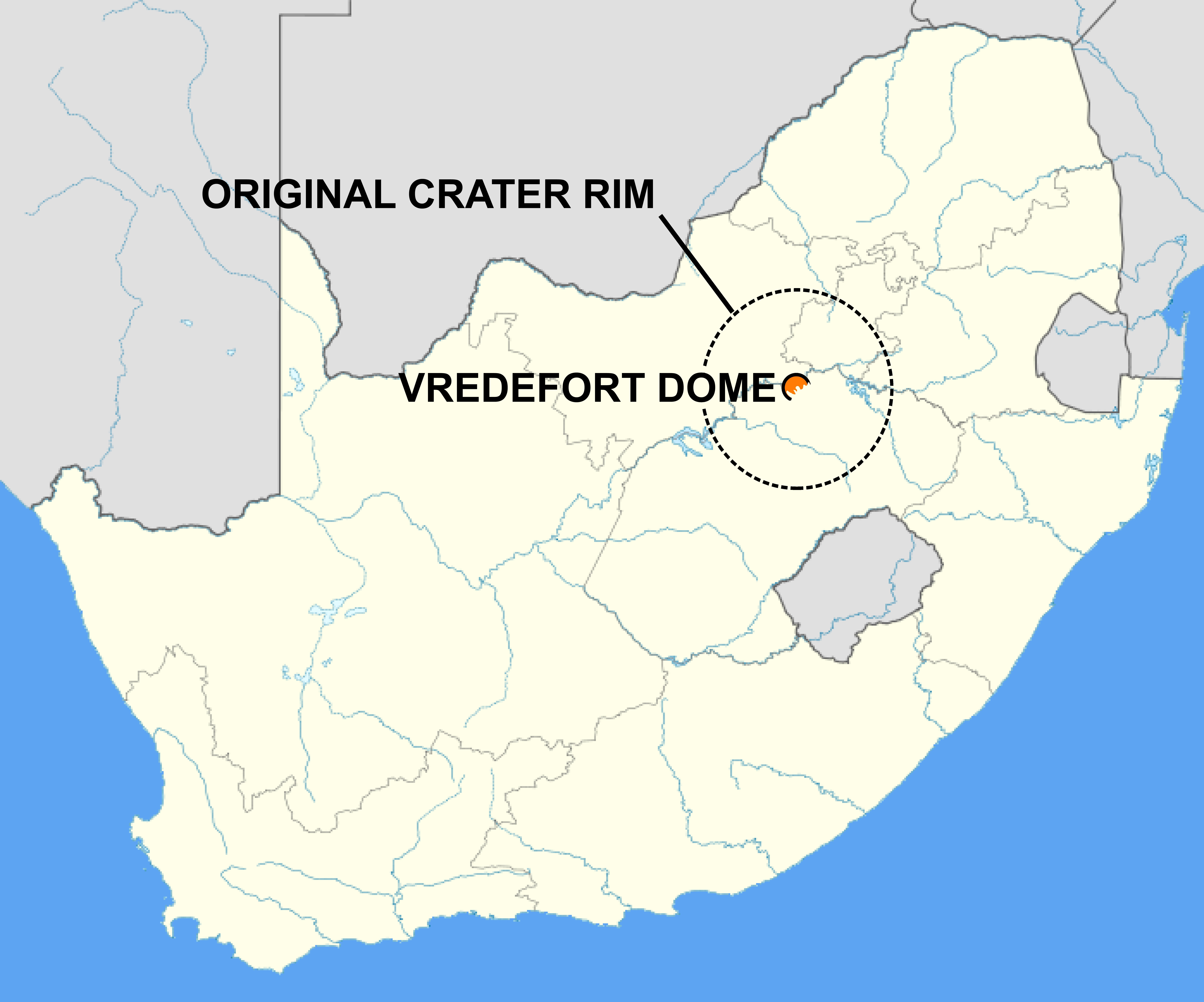
Map of South Africa showing the location of the Vredefort Dome, the remains of a 2.023-billion-year-old impact structure. The dashed line circle, 300 km (190 mi) in diameter, marks the extent of the original crater.

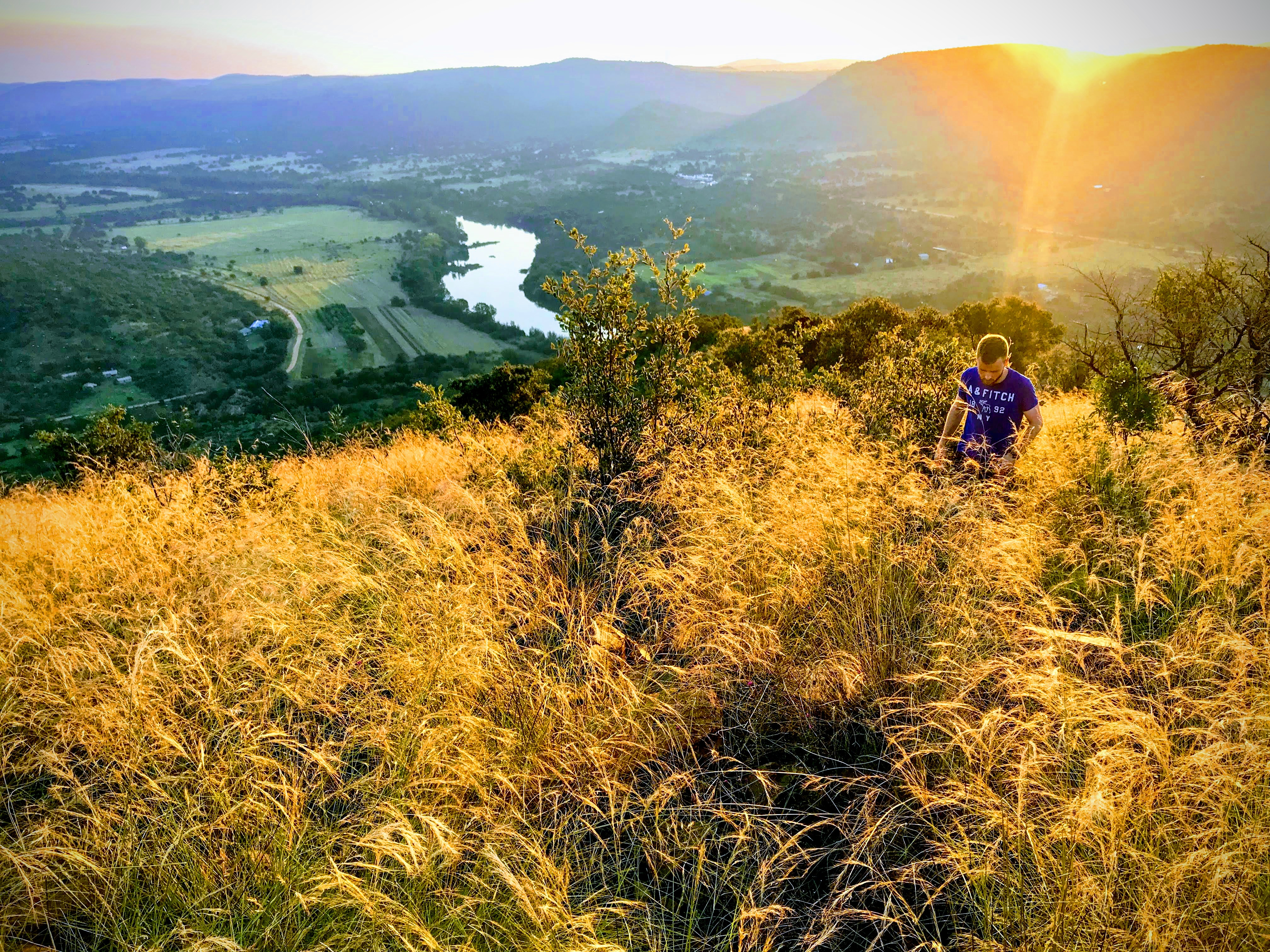
The view from the top of Aasvoëlkop in the heart of the Vredefort impact structure with the Vaal River and Venterskroon on its right in the background

The structure's impact origin was established in 1961 by the location of shatter cones by American geologists Robert S. Dietz and Robert B. Hargraves, after being proposed in 1937 by Claude C. Albritton and John D. Boon.

The asteroid that hit Vredefort is estimated to have been one of the largest ever to strike Earth since the Hadean Eon some four billion years ago, originally thought to have been approximately 10–15 km (6.2–9.3 mi) in diameter with a kinetic energy of 4.32×10^{23} joules. As of 2022, the asteroid was estimated at between 20 and 25 kilometres (12 and 16 mi) in diameter, and is estimated to have impacted with a vertical velocity of 15–25 kilometres per second (34,000–56,000 mph) and a range of energy of ~2-4×10^{24} J (~7.3×10^{23}-1.60×10^{24} J in relation to the previous estimate by a factor of 1.7-3.7), data apparently more consistent with geologic evidence such as shatter cones and planar deformation features.

The original impact structure is estimated to have had a diameter of at least 170 km (110 mi), with the impact affecting the structure of the surrounding host rock in a circular region around 300 km (190 mi) in diameter. Other estimates, according for example to the shatter cones or planar deformation features, have placed the original crater diameter closer to 300 km (190 mi). The landscape has been eroded to a depth of around 7–11 km (4.3–6.8 mi) since formation, obliterating the original crater. The remaining structure, the "Vredefort Dome", consists of a partial ring of hills 70 km (43 mi) in diameter, and is the remains of the central uplift created by the rebound of rock below the impact site after the collision.

Estimates have placed the structure's age to be 2.023 billion years (± 4 million years) or 2.019/2.020 billion years (± 2-3 million years) old, which places it in the Orosirian Period of the Paleoproterozoic Era. It is among the oldest universally accepted impact structures on Earth. In comparison, it is about 10% older than the Sudbury Basin impact (at 1.849 billion years) and the Yarrabubba impact structure is older than the Vredefort impact structure by about 10%. Other purported older impact structures have either poorly constrained ages (Dhala impact structure, India) or highly contentious impact evidence in the case of the circa 3.023 billion year old Maniitsoq structure, West Greenland and the circa 2.4 billion year old Suavjärvi structure, Russia. Their classification as impact structures remain controversial and unsettled.

The dome in the centre of the impact structure was originally thought to have been formed by a volcanic explosion, but in the mid-1990s, evidence revealed it was the site of a huge asteroid impact, the remains of the central uplift or rebound typical of large impacts, as telltale shatter cones were discovered in the bed of the nearby Vaal River. Shatter cones are found up to ~90 km and Planar deformation features on quartz up to ~45 km, while breccia up to ~150 km. These distances are very important to estimate the crater size between 250-300 km with a certain degree of reliability.

This impact structure is one of the few multiple-ringed impact structures on Earth, although they are more common elsewhere in the Solar System. Perhaps the best-known example is Valhalla crater on Jupiter's moon Callisto. Earth's Moon has some as well. Geological processes, such as erosion and plate tectonics, have destroyed most multiple-ring impact structures on Earth.

The impact distorted the Witwatersrand Basin which was laid down over a period of 250 million years between 950 and 700 million years before the Vredefort impact. The overlying Ventersdorp lavas and the Transvaal Supergroup which were laid down between 700 and 80 million years before the meteorite strike, were similarly distorted by the formation of the 300-kilometre-wide (190 mi) impact structure. The rocks form partial concentric rings around the impact structure's centre today, with the oldest, the Witwatersrand rocks, forming a semicircle 25 km (16 mi) from the centre. Since the Witwatersrand rocks consist of several layers of very hard, erosion-resistant sediments (e.g. quartzites and banded ironstones), they form the prominent arc of hills that can be seen to the northwest of the impact structure's centre in the satellite picture above. The Witwatersrand rocks are followed, in succession, by the Ventersdorp lavas at a distance of about 35 km (22 mi) from the centre, and the Transvaal Supergroup, consisting of a narrow band of the Ghaap Dolomite rocks and the Pretoria Subgroup of rocks, which together form a 25-to-30-kilometre-wide (16 to 19 mi) band beyond that.

From about halfway through the Pretoria Subgroup of rocks around the impact structure's centre, the order of the rocks is reversed. Moving outwards towards where the crater rim used to be, the Ghaap Dolomite group resurfaces at 60 km (37 mi) from the centre, followed by an arc of Ventersdorp lavas, beyond which, at between 80 and 120 km (50 and 75 mi) from the centre, the Witwatersrand rocks re-emerge to form an interrupted arc of outcrops today. The Johannesburg group is the most famous one because it was here that gold was discovered in 1886. It is thus possible that if it had not been for the Vredefort impact this gold would never have been discovered.

The 40-kilometre-diameter (25 mi) centre of the Vredefort impact structure consists of a granite dome (where it is not covered by much younger rocks belonging to the Karoo Supergroup) which is an exposed part of the Kaapvaal craton, one of the oldest microcontinents which formed on Earth 3.9 billion years ago. This central peak uplift, or dome, is typical of a complex impact structure, where the liquefied rocks splashed up in the wake of the meteor as it penetrated the surface.

A timeline of the Earth's history indicating when the Vredefort impact structure was formed in relation to some of the other important South African geological events. W indicates when the Witwatersrand Supergroup was laid down, C the Cape Supergroup, and K the Karoo Supergroup. The graph also indicates the period during which banded ironstone formations were formed on earth, indicative of an oxygen-free atmosphere. The Earth's crust was wholly or partially molten during the Hadean Eon. One of the first microcontinents to form was the Kaapvaal craton, which is exposed at the centre of the Vredefort Dome, and again north of Johannesburg.

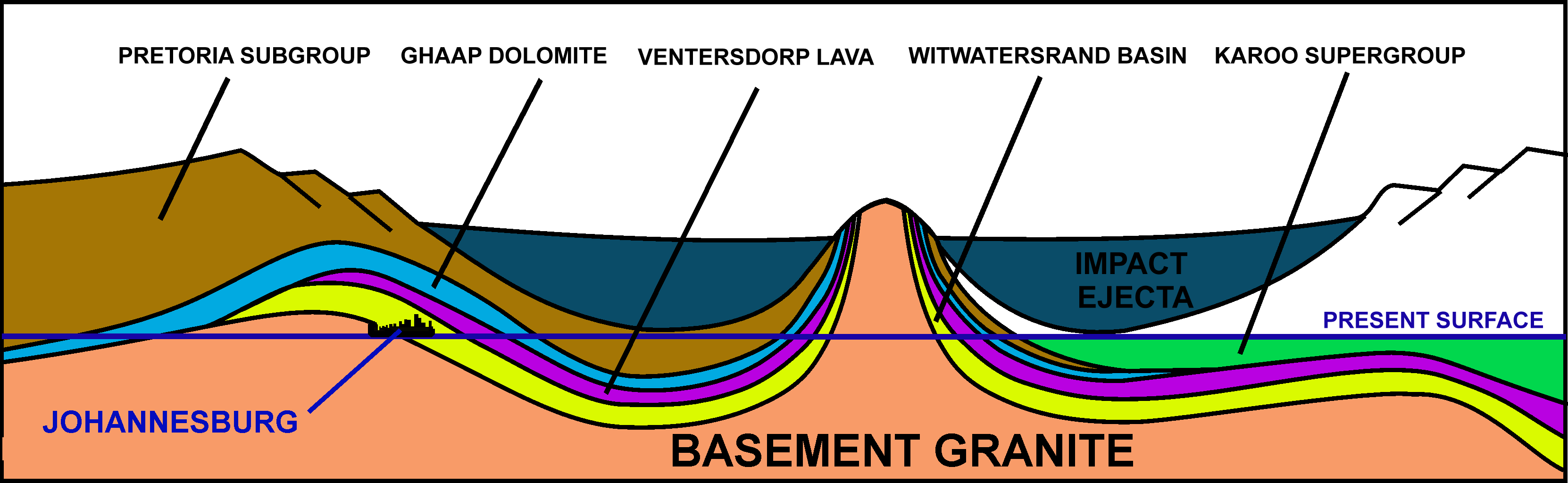
A schematic diagram of a NE (left) to SW (right) cross-section through the 2.020-billion-year-old Vredefort impact structure and how it distorted the contemporary geological structures. The present erosion level is shown. Johannesburg is where the Witwatersrand Basin (the yellow layer) is exposed at the "present surface" line, just inside the impact structure's rim, on the left. Not to scale.

== Conservation ==
The Vredefort Dome World Heritage Site is currently subject to property development, and local owners have expressed concern regarding sewage dumping into the Vaal River and the impact structure. The granting of prospecting rights around the edges of the impact structure has led environmental interests to express fear of destructive mining.

== Community ==
The Vredefort Dome in the centre of the impact structure is home to four towns: Parys, Vredefort, Koppies and Venterskroon. Parys is the largest and a tourist hub; both Vredefort and Koppies mainly depend on an agricultural economy.

On 19 December 2011, a broadcasting licence was granted by ICASA to a community radio station to broadcast for the Afrikaans- and English-speaking members of the communities within the impact structure. The Afrikaans name Koepel Stereo (Dome Stereo) refers to the dome and announces its broadcast as KSFM. The station broadcasts on 94.9 MHz FM.

== See also ==
- Deniliquin multiple-ring feature – Buried feature in south-east Australia, suggested to be an impact structure
- List of impact structures on Earth
- List of possible impact structures on Earth
