= Albritton =

Albritton is a surname. Notable people with the surname include:

- A. Brian Albritton, American attorney
- Alex Albritton (1892–1940), American baseball pitcher
- Ben Albritton (born 1968), American politician from Florida
- Claude C. Albritton (1913–1988), American geologist, professor, and university administrator
- Dakota Albritton, American baseball player
- Dave Albritton (1913–1994), American high jumper and politician
- Greg Albritton (born 1953), American politician from Alabama
- Harold Albritton (born 1936), American judge
- Rogers Albritton (1923–2002), American philosophy professor
- Sidney Albritton (born 1971), American politician from Mississippi
- Terry Albritton (1955–2005), American shot putter
- Vince Albritton (born 1962), American football player
