= List of homesteads in Western Australia: A =

This list includes all homesteads in Western Australia with a gazetted name. It is complete with respect to the 1996 Gazetteer of Australia. Dubious names have been checked against the online 2004 data, and in all cases confirmed correct. However, if any homesteads have been gazetted or deleted since 1996, this list does not reflect these changes. Strictly speaking, Australian place names are gazetted in capital letters only; the names in this list have been converted to mixed case in accordance with normal capitalisation conventions.

Name	Location	Remarks
A-alla	33°54′S 115°6′E	
A.Z.O. Ranch	29°40′S 115°17′E	
Abba Jireh	33°40′S 115°30′E	
Abbey Farm	33°43′S 115°2′E	
Aberfeldy	34°57′S 117°55′E	
Abernyte	35°2′S 117°32′E	
Abunda	32°50′S 117°42′E	
Abydos	21°25′S 118°56′E	
Acacia Hills	33°36′S 116°42′E	
Acadia	32°57′S 117°45′E	
Adadale	33°30′S 117°17′E	
Adair	31°25′S 116°53′E	
Adavale	32°39′S 117°16′E	
Adavale	33°42′S 117°29′E	
Addison	33°59′S 117°30′E	
Adelong	31°15′S 115°35′E	
Adelong	32°13′S 116°59′E	
Adelong	32°45′S 117°18′E	
Adelong	29°40′S 120°50′E	
Adina	33°45′S 115°9′E	
Adina	33°53′S 122°13′E	
Adina	33°52′S 115°47′E	
Adlinga	33°38′S 122°7′E	
Admella Downs	31°20′S 116°44′E	
Akoonah	33°14′S 119°55′E	
Akora	34°41′S 117°50′E	
Al Marita	33°41′S 117°12′E	
Alandale	29°51′S 115°24′E	
Alandale	32°14′S 117°59′E	
Alaska	34°51′S 118°3′E	
Alawa	31°57′S 118°12′E	
Albeena	33°57′S 117°38′E	
Albion Downs	27°17′S 120°23′E	
Alcheringa	29°42′S 115°29′E	
Aldba	30°38′S 116°2′E	
Alfalfa Park	31°43′S 116°31′E	
Alice Downs	17°45′S 127°56′E	
Alistine	33°35′S 117°32′E	
Allambee	34°29′S 117°37′E	
Allambee	34°4′S 116°58′E	
Allambie	31°15′S 115°44′E	
Allamosca	33°34′S 117°15′E	
Allan Dale	34°14′S 115°10′E	
Allanbrae	33°4′S 116°36′E	
Allandale	32°39′S 115°39′E	
Allandale	33°53′S 116°48′E	
Allandale	30°39′S 116°1′E	
Allanooka	29°3′S 115°2′E	
Allen Dale	34°10′S 118°7′E	
Allendale	33°15′S 117°10′E	
Allendale	33°21′S 117°26′E	
Allendale	31°20′S 116°28′E	
Allora	33°47′S 120°53′E	
Alluna	28°34′S 115°6′E	
Almaree	33°0′S 119°30′E	
Aloa Downs	33°17′S 121°29′E	
Aloha Park	34°6′S 118°56′E	
Alora-leigh	33°55′S 116°26′E	
Altino	30°53′S 115°39′E	
Alton Park	33°29′S 117°34′E	
Altona	27°32′S 119°59′E	
Alverstoke	33°16′S 115°47′E	
Amaroo	34°51′S 118°9′E	
Amaroo	33°9′S 119°43′E	
Amaroo	33°44′S 122°13′E	
Amaroo	34°23′S 118°49′E	
Amaroo	33°49′S 119°11′E	
Amaroo	34°1′S 119°0′E	
Amaroo Thorn	31°50′S 118°26′E	
Amber Farm	33°42′S 115°20′E	
Amber Springs	34°14′S 115°9′E	
Ambleside Farm	33°33′S 115°45′E	
Amelia Park	33°44′S 115°15′E	
Amerillup	34°36′S 117°19′E	
Amurl Park	28°47′S 115°47′E	
Anallen	33°41′S 121°26′E	
Anderson Place	34°28′S 118°46′E	
Andersons Spring	34°20′S 117°19′E	
Anembe	33°41′S 119°30′E	
Anembo	33°44′S 115°25′E	
Angelsey	34°17′S 117°31′E	
Angenup	33°52′S 117°15′E	
Anglefield	32°37′S 117°28′E	
Angus Downs	34°40′S 117°20′E	
Anketell	28°1′S 118°51′E	
Ankuri	32°13′S 117°30′E	
Anna Plains	19°15′S 121°29′E	
Annandale	32°6′S 116°52′E	
Annean	26°53′S 118°10′E	
Ansley Park	33°28′S 121°37′E	
Anster Farms	33°14′S 121°57′E	
Anumarrapirti	26°11′S 128°38′E	
Anuna	33°41′S 120°44′E	
Anunaka	33°32′S 115°58′E	
Apex	31°4′S 116°44′E	
Appila	33°37′S 117°53′E	
Apsley Downs	32°42′S 116°42′E	
Aquaviva	31°16′S 116°11′E	
Aquilla	33°19′S 118°42′E	
Arakoonah	34°8′S 115°7′E	
Araleun	34°43′S 117°21′E	
Aralinga	34°19′S 119°2′E	
Arallik	34°29′S 118°42′E	
Araluen	34°43′S 117°21′E	
Araluen	33°59′S 118°8′E	
Arawa	29°36′S 115°20′E	
Arbroath	34°38′S 117°53′E	
Arcadia	31°19′S 116°48′E	
Arcadia	34°32′S 117°31′E	
Arcadia	33°28′S 115°58′E	
Archer Hill	33°47′S 117°32′E	
Ardeer	32°37′S 117°56′E	
Arden Vale	33°37′S 115°39′E	
Ardjorie	18°46′S 123°43′E	
Ardmohr	33°42′S 117°59′E	
Ardmorre	33°29′S 117°28′E	
Ardua	34°36′S 118°39′E	
Arena	29°22′S 115°27′E	
Argo	33°39′S 116°24′E	
Argoon	29°00′36″S 118°47′23″E	
Argyle Downs	16°6′S 128°45′E	
Arinuna	34°34′S 117°25′E	
Arizona	34°32′S 117°53′E	
Arizona	30°29′S 116°52′E	
Arizona	33°19′S 118°40′E	
Arnecliff Woods	33°34′S 117°39′E	
Arnold Park	31°58′S 116°45′E	
Aroona	33°45′S 122°57′E	
Arradale	29°8′S 115°19′E	
Arramall	29°30′S 115°3′E	
Arrana	32°21′S 117°36′E	
Arrandale	33°50′S 120°17′E	
Arrino	34°19′S 118°27′E	
Arronvale	34°9′S 117°21′E	
Arrowsmith	29°27′S 115°29′E	
Arthur Downs	33°21′S 117°2′E	
Arubiddy	31°49′S 125°55′E	
Arundel	34°29′S 117°29′E	
Arundel	31°16′S 116°54′E	
Arundell	33°56′S 115°11′E	
Arzing	31°41′S 116°36′E	
Ascot Green	32°0′S 116°46′E	
Ascot Vale	33°36′S 117°50′E	
Ashburton Downs	23°23′S 117°2′E	
Ashby Side	31°23′S 115°56′E	
Ashdale	33°40′S 121°25′E	
Ashfield	32°28′S 118°11′E	
Ashfield	30°4′S 116°35′E	
Ashfield	33°13′S 118°26′E	
Ashgrove	33°28′S 121°16′E	
Ashley	31°20′S 116°31′E	
Ashton Park	33°55′S 117°13′E	
Athelston	34°33′S 117°42′E	
Athlone	33°50′S 117°2′E	
Atley	28°13′S 119°4′E	
Attonga	33°57′S 118°22′E	
Attunga	33°16′S 118°53′E	
Attunga	30°47′S 115°47′E	
Attwood	32°32′S 117°44′E	
Atunga	34°22′S 117°9′E	
Aubrey Hill	32°7′S 116°48′E	
Auburn Farm	32°36′S 116°49′E	
Auchenteck	33°44′S 121°20′E	
Aurora	34°10′S 117°24′E	
Austin Downs	27°23′S 117°44′E	
Austinlea	33°41′S 117°38′E	
Avago	32°48′S 118°1′E	
Avalon	33°2′S 115°52′E	
Avalon	29°51′S 116°11′E	
Avalon	34°27′S 118°36′E	
Avalon	34°40′S 117°54′E	
Avalon	32°17′S 117°48′E	
Avelon	33°20′S 115°46′E	
Avoca	34°19′S 118°59′E	
Avoca	29°18′S 115°8′E	
Avoca Downs	30°57′S 122°19′E	
Avon	32°8′S 116°52′E	
Avon Brook	32°30′S 117°32′E	
Avon Farm	31°33′S 116°54′E	
Avon Valley	32°28′S 117°3′E	
Avon View	31°43′S 116°33′E	
Avondale	32°7′S 116°53′E	
Avondale	33°42′S 117°27′E	
Avondale	33°59′S 116°18′E	
Avondale Park	32°4′S 116°49′E	
Avondowns	32°33′S 116°31′E	
Avonlea	33°15′S 116°44′E	
Avonlea	34°30′S 117°32′E	
Avonlea	33°20′S 115°45′E	
Avonleigh	34°52′S 117°16′E	
Avons Park	32°22′S 117°1′E	
Avonside	31°53′S 116°52′E	
Avovalley	31°23′S 115°56′E	
Ayhill Farm	34°54′S 117°53′E	
Aylesbury	33°37′S 117°32′E	
Aylestone	31°15′S 116°33′E	

== See also ==
- List of pastoral leases in Western Australia
