= Marianne Klemun =

Austrian historian of science

- Born: 9 April 1955; Ruden
- Awards: Mary C. Rabbitt History And Philosophy of Geology Award

Academic background
- Education: University of Vienna

Marianne Klemun is an Austrian science historian, and is a retired associate professor in the Department of Modern History at the University of Vienna. She focuses on the history of field-based sciences and science in museums. In 2022 Klemun was awarded the Mary C. Rabbitt Award by the Geological Society of America and the Carinthian Historical Society's Medal of Honor.

== Academic career ==
Klemun was born in Ruden and attended school in Rinkenberg. She studied history, German language and literature and the history of art, biology and geology at the University of Vienna. She completed her Habilitation in 2002, when she became a professor in the Department of Modern History at the university.

Klemun has been on the board of the International Commission for History of the Geological Sciences since 2016, and is the European Vice President for the commission. She has also served on the committee of the History of the Earth Sciences Society and on the board of the Austrian Society of History of Science.

In 2020 the University of Vienna held a conference in Klemun's honor, titled Departures, Summit trails, Side Paths: Nature Studies on the Move. Laudatory remarks were given by Christa Ehrmann-Hammerle and Mitchell Ash of the university, Johannes Mattes of the Austrian Academy of Sciences and Kurt Schmutzer of the Austrian Broadcasting Corporation.

In 2022 Klemun was awarded the Mary C. Rabbitt Award by the Geological Society of America. The award is presented annually to one person, "for exceptional scholarly contributions of fundamental importance to our understanding of the history of the geological sciences". Klemun's citation noted Klemun's contributions to the study of the history of geology, including publications on Austrian geologist Eduard Suess, the Austrian Geological Institute (Geologische Reichsanstalt), and geology of the Alps. She has published more than 175 papers.

Also in 2022 Klemun was awarded the Carinthian Historical Society's Medal of Honor. She has been a member of the society for more than forty years, organizing exhibitions and writing articles on natural scientists from Carinthia, including Franz Xaver Freiherr von Wulfen and Meinrad Thaurer von Gallenstein.

== Selected works ==
- Marianne Klemun: Einheit und Vielfalt Franz Ungers (1800–1870) Konzepte der Naturforschung im internationalen Kontext Vienna University Press, Göttingen 2016, ISBN 978-3-8471-0484-1.
- Klemun, Marianne; Spring, Ulrike, eds. (2016). Scientific Expeditions as Experiments. London/New York/Melbourne: Palgrave & Macmillan. doi:10.1057/978-1-137-58106-8.
- Marianne Klemun, Helga Hühnel: Nikolaus Jacquin (1727–1817) – a naturalist (he) is found. Vandenhoeck & Ruprecht, Vienna University Press, Göttingen 2017, ISBN 978-3-8471-0710-1.
- Mike Johnston; Marianne Klemun (2019). "Looking back to the roots of INHIGEO: The inaugural and 50th anniversary meetings held in Yerevan in 1967 and 2017". Episodes. 42 (1): 69–75. doi:10.18814/epiiugs/2019/019002. Wikidata Q63457343.
- Marianne Klemun (1996). "Joseph Raditschnig von Lerchenfeld (1753-1812) - Botanik im Spannungsfeld von Josefhinismus, Spätaufklärung und Öffentlichkeit" (PDF). Stapfia (in German). 45: 319–344. ISSN 0252-192X. Wikidata Q105746693. Archived from the original (PDF) on 29 January 2022.
- Marianne Klemun (2006). "Natural Science and Geology as a Medium of Integration: The Versammlung deutscher Naturforscher und Ärzte in Prague in 1837 and the Meetings of German Natural Scientists and Physicians during the 'Vormärz' (1822–1848)". Centaurus. 48 (4): 284–297. doi:10.1111/j.1600-0498.2006.00053.x. Wikidata Q133014497.
- Marianne Klemun; Marina Loskutova; Anastasia Fedotova (2018). "Skulls and blossoms: Collecting and the meaning of scientific objects as resources from the 18th to the 20th century". Centaurus. 60 (4): 231–237. doi:10.1111/1600-0498.12211. Wikidata Q127317721.
