= Walga Rock =

Granite monolith on Austin Downs Station in Western Australia

- Walganna Rock, Walgahna Rock
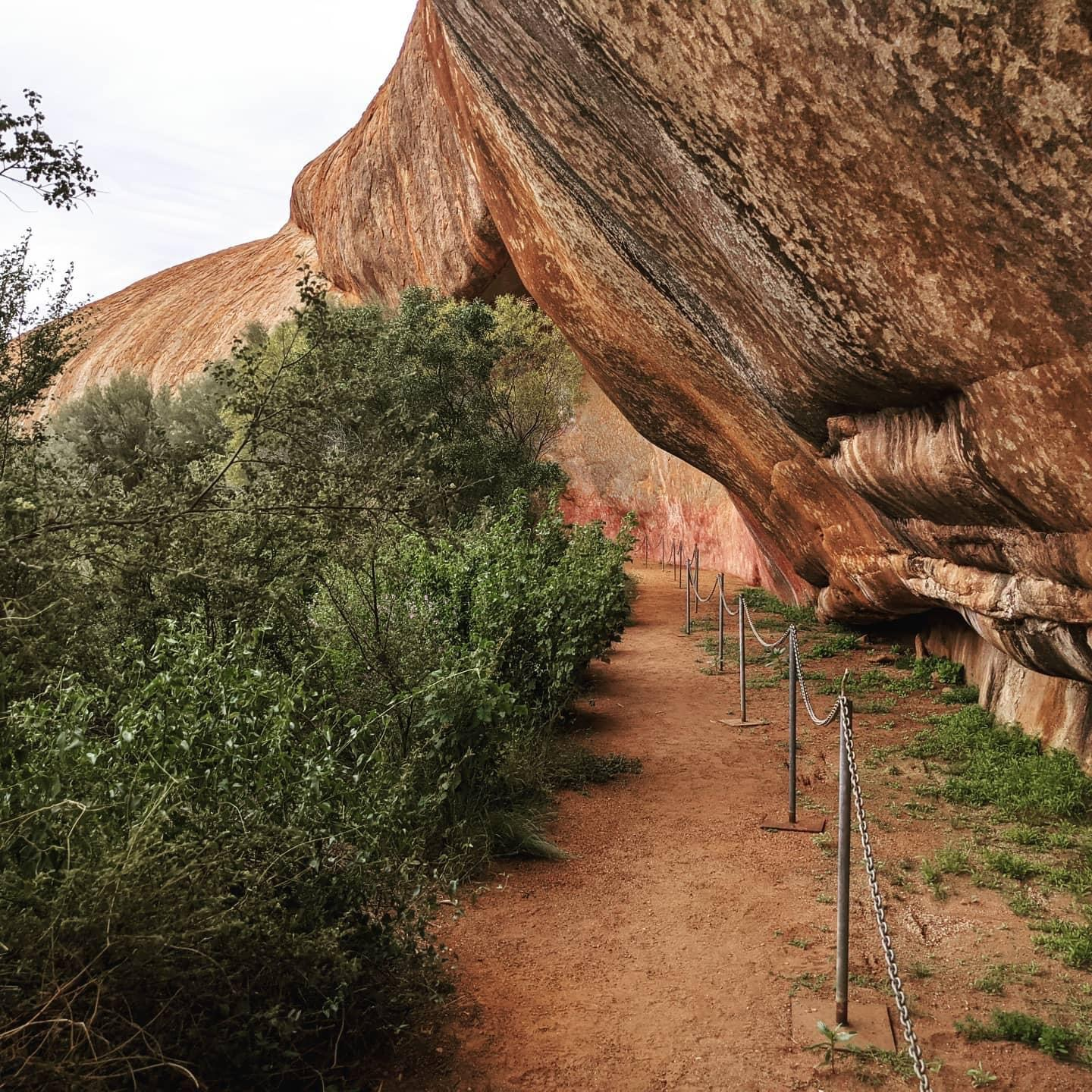

Highest point
- Coordinates: 27°24′01″S 117°28′08″E

Naming
- English translation: Blood that comes from the Kangaroo

Geography
- Country: Australia
- State: Western Australia
- Region: Mid West
- Shire: Shire of Cue

Geology
- Mountain type: Granite whaleback
- Rock type: K-feldspar porphyritic monzogranite

Western Australia Heritage Register
- Official name: Walga Rock
- Type: Municipal Inventory
- Designated: 28 November 1996
- Reference no.: 6591
- Municipality: Shire of Cue

Walga Rock, also known as Walgahna Rock and Walganna Rock, is a granite monolith situated about 48 kilometres (30 mi) west of Cue, Western Australia, within the Austin Downs pastoral lease. It is one of the largest granite monoliths in Australia.

It is of profound cultural significance to Aboriginal people; the Wajarri elders are the acknowledged traditional owners. An extensive gallery of Aboriginal art exists within a cave in Walga Rock. While it is the subject of a great deal of research and fieldwork subsequent to a detailed examination conducted in the 1930s by the American anthropologist D. S. Davidson (who considered it to be "one of the most extensive galleries so far reported in Australia"), the first known European record of Walga is by Daisy Bates. Though she did not visit the rock and its gallery when travelling through the region in 1908, "Walga" is marked near the mining towns of Cue and Day Dawn and many other sites of Aboriginal significance on sketch Map 19 held at the State Library of Western Australia as part of her Special Map Collection.

== Painting ==
Other than to the place and its ancient gallery, visitors are regularly drawn to an apparently anomalous painting of what appeared at first glance to be a European-tradition sailing ship. It appears superimposed over some of the earlier works and underneath there are lines of writing that to some resembles a Cyrillic or Arabic script. While the Indigenous gallery is in itself remarkable, there has been a great deal of speculation about the painting, especially considering it is located 325 kilometres (202 mi) from the coast. It has been argued that it was drawn by survivors of the heavily armed three-masted Dutch East India Company (Dutch: Vereenigde Oostindische Compagnie, commonly abbreviated to VOC) ships Batavia or Zuiddorp; or that it represents a "contact painting" by Indigenous Australians who saw a ship on the coast and then moved inland. While there are many examples of Indigenous art depicting vessels on the Western Australian coast, including others showing what appears to be SS Xantho and possibly another steamer at Inthanoona Station east of Cossack, the Walga Rock painting is one of the most inland examples.

Those believing the images represents a VOC ship, are of the opinion the middle (or main) mast of the three shown in the Walga Rock/Walganha Rock image had broken and fallen overboard. Ratlines (to enable the crew to scale the rigging), and some stays (holding the masts vertical) are depicted and seven gunports are evident along the hull.

Evidence now points to the image being that of a two-masted steamship with a tall funnel.

== SS Xantho: inspiration for the Walga Rock ship image? ==
Of the two-masted colonial steamships operating in the north-west of Australia, SS Xantho owned by the controversial pearler and pastoralist Charles Edward Broadhurst is the most likely inspiration for the Walga Rock painting. Research indicates the Walga Rock "gunports" may not be false at all, rather they are most likely square or rectangular scuttles (port holes) that can be opened like a gunport. These often appeared on passenger ferries designed to operate in sheltered waters and were opened for the comfort of its passengers when travelling in calm waters and when it got too hot below decks. When SS Xantho was built in 1848 as a ferry, reference was made in its contract to it being similar to PS Loch Lomond which is known to have rectangular ventilation ports, for example.

The first European account of the Walga Rock ship image appeared in the Christmas Edition of the Geraldton Guardian in 1928. In looking to who the artist or artists may have been, research conducted by mid-west historian Stan Gratte, based on interviews with "old Cue residents" and local sheep station identities the Ryan brothers, indicates the Walga Rock painting was produced around 1917 by Sammy "Malay", also known as Sammy Hassan. Research into the possibility the lines of writing were Arabic added further to the Ryan's belief that the artist was Sammy Hassan, as does advice from Malaysian visitors to the Shipwreck Museum in Fremantle who felt the four lines underneath the Walghana ship could represent Jawi (a Malay-Arabic script). Local legend records Sammy Hassan accidentally shooting himself in the leg, being hospitalised and eventually dying of his injuries.

A man known as 'Sammy Malay' camped for many years at Sammy Well outstation on the north east end of Dirk Hartog Island at an outcamp that still appears marked on station maps and some charts as "Sammy Well". Apparently a "Malay" (the name generally but incorrectly describing indentured labourers who came to the north west from the islands north of Australia), it was considered that Sammy could have been one of many hundreds of indentured "Malay" pearl divers who were transported to north west Australia in the early 1870s. Hundreds were seen operating alongside European and Aboriginal pearlers at the Flying Foam Passage near Cossack and many travelled to Shark Bay and centres on the north-west coast as indentured labourers with contracts promising they would be housed and repatriated by the pearling masters. 140 boys aged between 12–14 were transported on SS Xantho from Batavia for work in the industry for example. Many contracts were broken and as one example some "Malays" were abandoned by Broadhurst at Geraldton when SS Xantho sank in 1872 and many others suffered a similar fate three years later in Shark Bay.

Despite the Ryan Brothers linking Sammy Hassan with the image, other local identities disagreed with the 1917 date, however, with some believing the image was from the turn of the century.

Shark Bay identities also disputed ‘their' Sammy Malay's link with the Walga Rock image, for local legend has it that he received a shark bite while recovering gold coins (which he regularly presented to the Dirk Hartog Island station owners) from a shipwreck that lay in shallow water near his camp; and after dragging himself back to his hut died from blood loss, accompanied only by his dog.

In 2020 the many claims and theories surrounding the Walga Rock ship image up to that time were examined and presented in a paper appearing in the Great Circle, Journal of The Australian Association for Maritime History entitled "The Walga Rock Ship: Chronicle of a Century-Old Unsolved Mystery".

In that work numerous unresolved issues, including the date the ship image first appeared and the discrepancy between the Shark Bay legend that Sammy died from the effects of shark bite at his camp on Dirk Hartog Island and the Ryan Brother's account that he moved to Walga Rock and produced the painting in 1917, were not resolved by the time the Great Circle article appeared in 2020.

Further, though accepting the image is likely to represent SS Xantho, anthropologist Esmée Webb disputed the Sammy "Malay" connection believing the ship to be a Yamaji "warning story" about pearlers capturing Aboriginal men and women and marooning them on offshore islands.

Research conducted by Denis Cherry MD has cast light on Sammy Hassan and his life in Western Australia nonetheless. Dr Cherry has traced an application from Sammy seeking permission to marry an Aboriginal woman 'Mary Ann' dated October 1906 and posted from Pindar near Cue. Cherry has also found evidence Sammy Hassan was born in Singapore, had arrived in the Colony around 1890 and died at Cue hospital in the early 1930s. While Dr Cherry's research is ongoing he has resolved two issues outstanding after the publication of the 2020 Walga Rock paper in the Great Circle: First, Sammy Hassan was living in the Walga Rock-Cue-Pindar area in the early 20th century adding weight to the Ryan Brothers’ accounts, and second that there appears to have been another man described as ’Sammy Malay’ (or similar) in the mid-west pastoral industry.

Thus, though a man called 'Sammy Malay’ certainly lived at Sammy Well in Shark Bay at Shark Bay and a ’Sammy Malay’ was in the Walga Rock area and living in the company of Aboriginal folk at the time the Ryan Brothers stated he produced the ship painting at the ancient gallery there, the question why it was painted remains unresolved.
