= Cogla Downs Station =

Pastoral lease in Western Australia

Coordinates: 27.43177°S 118.92567°E

Location in Western Australia

Cogla Downs Station is a pastoral lease and sheep station located in the Mid West region of Western Australia.

The word Cogla is the Aboriginal name for the fruit of a climbing plant found in the surrounding mulga country.

== Description ==
Situated approximately 71 kilometres (44 mi) to the north-west of Sandstone and 102 kilometres (63 mi) south east of Meekatharra, the station covers an area of 199,478 hectares (492,921 acres). The property adjoins Yarrabubba to the north, Barrambie to the east, Windsor Station to the south and Yarraquin Station to the west.

The country is rangeland and covered by natural grasses, mulga, spinifex, saltbush, bowgada and carara.

== History ==
Mr. W. McKenzie Grant owned the station in 1917, which was a reasonable year at Cogla, with 129 bales of wool produced from 7,000 sheep. The property was being steadily improved with extra fencing and well sinking during the year.

Cogla Downs was put up for sale in 1920; at this time it occupied an area of approximately 320,000 acres (129,499 ha) and was divided into 18 paddocks with about 200 miles (322 km) of fencing. Stock could be watered using the 15 wells that had been sunk. It was stocked with about 9,000 sheep.

Owned by Messrs Beaton and Broad in 1923, the station had a good season, shearing some 10,300 sheep in total for a total of 173 bales of wool.

The station despatched 1,000 wethers in 1926 to metropolitan markets from the Day Dawn trucking yards.

In 1927 the station had a good season with 7,600 sheep being shorn to produce 153 wool bales.

The station was once known as Nettlie and was owned by Chas Beaton in 1928; at this time Beaton was experimenting growing navel oranges and lemon trees on the property. The station had a satisfactory clip later in 1928 with 8,000 sheep and lambs being shorn to produce 113 bales of wool.

When advertised in 1929 the property had 29 wells equipped with mills and troughing and was subdivided into 21 paddocks fenced with over 874 miles (1,407 km) of fencing. Cogla also had 14 room homestead, another 7 rooms for shearing quarters and three out-stations. It was stocked with approximately 9,000 sheep at the time with 50 cattle and 40 horses.

In 1930 the flock was clipped producing 224 bales of wool. At the time the flock consisted of over 8,442 sheep and 3,204 lambs with stragglers not included.

The Beaton family still owned the station in 1953.

The station was purchased by the Indigenous Land Council on behalf of the Yulellah Fabrications Aboriginal corporation in 1994. The station is run for training and economic development purposes. Yulellah remained the lessee in 2012; Cogla is operating under the Crown Lease number CL124-1967 and has the Land Act number LA3114/744.

== See also ==
- List of ranches and stations
- List of pastoral leases in Western Australia
