= Yarrabubba =

Pastoral lease in Western Australia

Coordinates: 27.130°S 118.78°E

Location in Western Australia

Yarrabubba Station, often referred to as Yarrabubba, is a pastoral lease that currently operates as a cattle station but has previously operated as a sheep station.

It is located about 66 kilometres (41 mi) south east of Meekatharra and 80 kilometres (50 mi) north east of Cue in the Mid West region of Western Australia. Yarrabubba shares a boundary with Cogla Downs Station. The Yarrabubba impact structure, which takes its name from the property, is found on the margins of the station.

The property was advertised for sale in 1906. At this time it occupied an area of 294,000 acres (118,978 ha) and was stocked with 100 head of cattle. Yarrabubba was equipped with five windmills and 30 wells and divided into two paddocks. The Nairn brothers, pastoralists from Carnamah, purchased Yarrabubba in 1908.

Sheep were being run at Yarrabubba in 1910 with the station producing wool for the London market. The station had an 8-stand shearing shed and during shearing in 1912 about 6,000 sheep were put over the boards. By 1915 an estimated 9,000 sheep were grazing at Yarrabubba, with the flock increasing to about 13,000 in 1916.

In 1925 the Nairns acquired Leinster Downs Station in the northern Goldfields and stocked it with sheep from Yarrabubba. Shearing at Yarrabubba in 1928 produced a total of 255 bales of wool from a flock of 15,300 sheep.

In 2010 the Howden family owned Yarrabubba. They also owned neighbouring Murchison Downs, which was running 100 cattle in 2009 along with another 300 on Yarrabubba.

== See also ==
- List of ranches and stations
