= Yarraquin =

Pastoral lease in Western Australia

Coordinates: 27.429°S 117.965°E

Location in Western Australia

Yarraquin or Yarraquin Station is a pastoral lease that currently operates as a cattle station and had previously operated as a sheep station.

It is located about 7 kilometres (4 mi) east of Cue and 71 kilometres (44 mi) north of Mount Magnet in the Mid West region of Western Australia. The property occupies an area of approximately 131,864 hectares (325,843 acres) of rangeland and has a carrying capacity of approximately 8,400 sheep. It adjoins Cogla Downs Station.

The property has two homesteads, the newer of which is a modern five bedroom, two bathroom home. When placed on the market in 2012 the property was running 600 head of cattle.

John Herbert Butcher, who owned Yarraquin in 1929, died the same year. The property was retained by the Butcher family who also owned Meeberrie and Nangetty Station. Charles John Butcher, who part owned the property, died in 1931 after falling under the wheel of a wool wagon.

When placed on the market for auction in 1934 the station occupied an area of 676,737 acres (273,866 ha).

Leslie Keamy, the prominent merino stud breeder and owner of Cardo Station, once held an interest in Yarraquin and Austin Downs Station.

== See also ==
- List of ranches and stations
