= Mary C. Rabbitt =

Geologist

- Born: 25 January 1915; Boston, Massachusetts, U.S.
- Died: 8 August 2002 (aged 87); Washington, D.C., U.S.
- Education: Radcliffe College (AB)
- Occupation: Geophysicist
- Spouse: John Charles Rabbitt
- Children: None

Mary Collins Rabbitt (January 25, 1915 – August 8, 2002), born Mary Priscilla Collins, was an American geophysicist, administrator, and historian for the United States Geological Survey (USGS). Her interest in seismology led her to working alongside well-known seismologist, Perry Byerly. Later on, she worked for Kirtley Mather, and eventually, as an assistant to James Balsley. As well as her contributions to the USGS, Rabbit revitalized the editorial process of scientific publications. In Minerals, Lands, and Geology for the Common Defense and General Welfare Volume 2, 1879-1904, Rabbit outlines how the development of public land, mapping policies, and the development of mineral resources in the United States shaped the maturation of the field of geology. Volume 3 describes the USGS' interest in reviewing basic research from the 1904 conservation movement for strategic mineral studies. She describes the struggles researchers faced during the intervention of the Federal government for conservation and public land classification, and how World War I's subsequent economic crash in 1929 increased strain on the studies. Rabbitt also conveys how the changing economies of coal and agriculture, as well as the need to study water and minerals, put excess strain on the Survey.

== Career ==
In 1937, after earning her bachelor of arts in geological sciences from Radcliffe, Rabbitt worked alongside Perry Byerly as a research assistant at the University of California, Berkeley. Continuing her career as a research assistant, she would return to Radcliffe to work for Kirtley Mather.

During the second world war, she moved her career to Tennessee to serve at the Oak Ridge Observatory, working with the Office of Scientific Research and Development on explosion seismology.

After the war, Rabbitt assisted the Allied groups, moving to Japan to do so. Mary later joined her husband working for the USGS in 1949, headlining the Geophysical Abstracts Unit.

On August 9, 1950, Rabbit was appointed to a committee, which was part of the Seismological Society of America. They were tasked with nominating candidates for the Board of Directors and the Scientific Council election. She was the only female member in the group. She worked as the Branch's Assistant Chief during the years of 1950-1957. During this time, and even after, she worked alongside branch chief James Balsley as his assistant on many projects. The two of them worked to further articulate the concepts of tectonics, geologic time scale, and the impact of factors such as stress and heat on stratification. This led to a greater understanding of various topics, including magnetic-ore deposits, global tectonics and the behaviour of rocks and soils under various temperatures and pressures.

In the year of 1954, she published her first book, Geophysical Abstracts 157: April–June 1954: abstracts of current literature pertaining to the physics of the solid earth and to geophysical exploration, alongside Dorothy B. Vitaliano, S.T. Vesselowsky, and others.

Shortly after, in 1956, she published Geophysical abstracts, 166 July–September 1956.

After her retirement in 1978, Rabbitt would carry on with her passion for geology by publishing a 3-volume history and assessment of federal earth-science and mapping policies. The first volume of Minerals, Lands, and Geology for the Common Defense and General Welfare was published in 1979.

In 1980, she published the second volume of Minerals, Lands, and Geology for the Common Defense and General Welfare, as well as John Wesley Powell: soldier, explorer, scientist. Volume 3, 1904‒1939 was published in 1986. In the same year, Rabbitt also published A Brief History of the U.S. Geological Survey.

In 1995, she published John Wesley Powell's exploration of the Colorado River, her last published work before Volume 4 was published in 2015. The fourth edition was begun by Rabbitt, but completed by Clifford M. Nelson, a geologist with the USGS who co-authored the book. These texts covered the late 18th century and early 19th century reviewing topics in American history such as politics, economics and democracy through the lens of geologic history, minerals and mining. Rabbitt also provides information about geography, topography and palaeontology. Her pieces influenced a number of geologists, including George W. White and James R. Fleming. Her contributions are referenced in White's article, The Colorado River Region and John Wesley Powell. Mary C. Rabbitt, Edwin D. McKee John Wesley Powell and the Anthropology of the Canyon Country. Don D. Fowler, Robert C. Euler, Catherine S. Fowler, and Fleming's Minerals, Lands, and Geology for the Common Defence and General Welfare. Volume III: 1904-1939.

== Personal life ==
Mary Collins Rabbitt, née Mary Priscilla Collins, was born on January 25, 1915. She was of Irish heritage and grew up in Boston, Massachusetts, in the suburb of Canton. Rabbitt died on August 8, 2002, in Washington, DC, at the age of 87. Although she did not have any children, her legacy lives on through her niece and two nephews: Patricia M. Leradi, John A. Collins III, and Michael J. Collins. At the Radcliffe Institute for Advanced Study, Rabbitt explored the geological sciences, most notably looking into nuclear explosive’s seismology. While Rabbitt studied at Radcliffe, it was against Harvard University’s policies to allow students studying at Radcliffe also to attend classes at Harvard. Two years post-graduation, she returned to Radcliffe where she pursued teaching, as well as assisting as a seismologist. Esper Larsen, a professor at Harvard, allowed Rabbitt to work in his office under his tutelage. After earning her Bachelor of Arts degree in Geological Sciences, Mary aided in the rejuvenation of systematic research methods while studying the earth. Through their shared interest in seismology, she worked as a teaching fellow and research assistant to Perry Byerly at the University of California at Berkeley. Her work was acknowledged by The Geological Society of America's History for aiding in the revitalization of systematic research methods when studying the earth. Two years after graduating, Mary returned to Radcliffe, once again working as a teaching fellow as well as an assistant seismologist. After marrying John Charles ("Jack") Rabbitt, a geologist with the USGS in Washington, DC, in 1947, Mary joined the U.S. Coast Guard and Geodetic Survey's seismology branch. Mary would later join her husband in working for the USGS in 1949, headlining the Geophysical Abstracts Unit. Throughout her life, Mary was part of the "Geological Society of America, the American Geophysical Union, the Seismological Society, and the Society of Exploration Geophysicists." She would then retire in 1978. According to Rabbitt, the study of geology was first differentiated from the study of natural history at a mining school in Freiberg, Saxony, but the science of geology began to advance once the United States Federal Government began employing geologists to evaluate mineral resources and classify mineral lands.

== Accomplishments ==
Rabbitt had numerous accomplishments made throughout her career. Alongside her seven publications, her work was acknowledged by "The Geological Society of America's History" for aiding in the rejuvenation of systematic research methods when studying the earth. In 1988, Rabbitt won the "Department of the Interior’s Distinguished Service Award." Another accomplishment of hers was the creation of "The Mary C. Rabbit History and Philosophy of Geology Award; it was first created in 1981 and renamed in her honor later on in 2005. It is now awarded to individuals each year for their "exceptional scholarly contributions of fundamental importance to our understanding of the history of the geological sciences." Notable recipients of the award include Claude C. Albritton (1983), Ursula B. Marvin (1986), Martin J. S. Rudwick (1987), Stephen Jay Gould (1988), Sandra Herbert (2006), Naomi Oreskes (2019) and Marianne Klemun (2022).

== Works published ==
Rabbitt published throughout the duration of her career, including:

- Volume 78., No. 6., (published in 1954) Rabbitt had work published by the American Association for the Advancement of Science. This volume outlines how the Survey had implemented an extensive program targeted at determining the quantity, quality, and availability of surface and ground waters as well as providing data for their efficient utilization and conservation. This review only highlighted the Survey’s activities in the Colorado Plateaus, but the data provided from it was published by the Geological Survey in the form of maps and reports as well as published as technical papers for scientific and engineering journals.
- “Volume 1, Before 1879”
- “Volume 2, 1879‒1904” (published in 1980) outlines how the development of public land, mapping policies, and the development of mineral resources in the United States shaped the maturation of the field of geology.
- John Wesley Powell: soldier, explorer, scientist (published 1980)
- Volume 3, 1904‒1939” (published in 1986). This volume outlines the USGS' study into the research obtained from the 1904 conservation movement until the studies on strategic minerals. Rabbitt outlines the struggles researchers faced during the Federal government’s intervention for conservation and public land classification. She describes how World War 1 and the subsequent economic crash in 1929 increased strain on these studies. She also conveyed how the changing economies of coal, agriculture, and the need to study water and minerals put excess strain on the Survey.
- A Brief History of the U.S. Geological Survey (published 1986)
- John Wesley Powell’s Exploration of the Colorado River: (published in 1995) Rabbitt describes U.S. soldier, geologist, explorer, John Wesley Powell's, discoveries in the Colorado Plateau. She describes the depositional processes in the Grand Canyon as the Colorado River flows through the Grand Canyon, eroding the canyon walls and exposing layers of rock and fossil evidence recording a span of approximately two billion years.
- Volume 4 was published in 2015. The fourth edition was begun by Rabbitt, but was "completed by the coauthor Clifford M. Nelson, a geologist with the USGS since 1976." The book primarily discusses the geological mapping done by the USGS and the history of the USGS between 1939 and 1961. This volume highlights the implications geological surveying had in international relations and conflicts, specifically during World War II. The contributions Rabbitt made before she passed were edited and extended upon by coauthor, Clifford Nelson. This was in an effort to make the book coherent and ‘that readers will not be able to distinguish between the parts of this volume written by Mary Rabbitt and those modified or newly written by [him]’
