= Venterskroon =

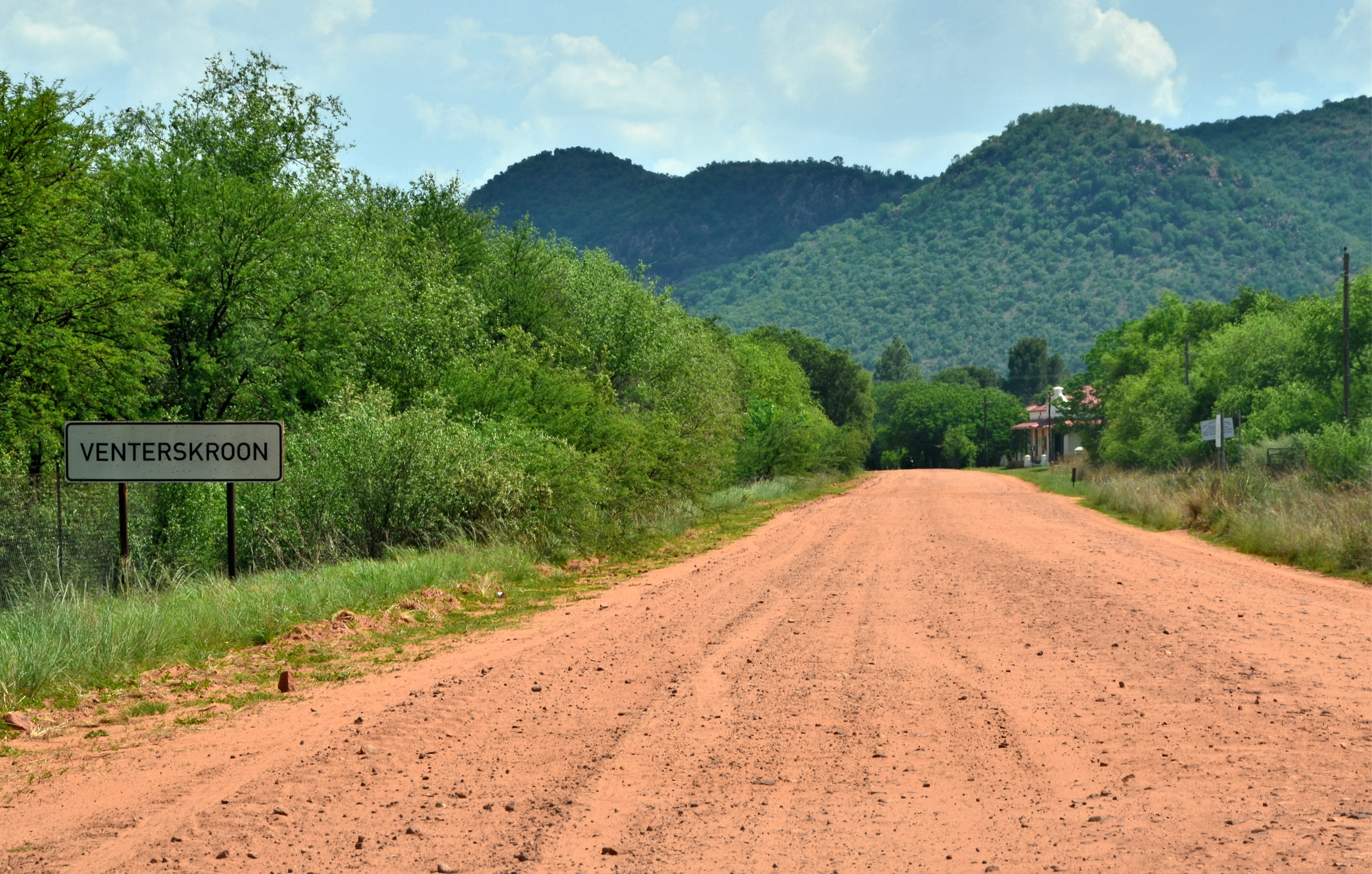
- The gravel road through Venterskroon

- Location within North West (South African province) Location within South Africa
- Coordinates: 26°53′09″S 27°16′15″E
- Country: South Africa
- Province: North West
- District: Dr Kenneth Kaunda
- Municipality: JB Marks
- Time zone: UTC+2 (SAST)

Venterskroon is a town in Tlokwe Local Municipality in the North West province of South Africa. It is an old mining town located in a valley in the middle of the Dome Mountain Land.

Venterskroon is home to the Vredefort Dome Information Centre. The Vredefort Dome is the center of the Vredefort impact structure. This impact structure is the world's largest, oldest, and most deeply eroded complex asteroid impact structure in the world, and has been listed by UNESCO as a World Heritage Site.

Evidence of the earliest inhabitants of the Venterskroon area has been found at the farm Thabela Thabeng and consists of petroglyphs representing hippos and rhinos.
