= Hong Kong–South Africa relations =

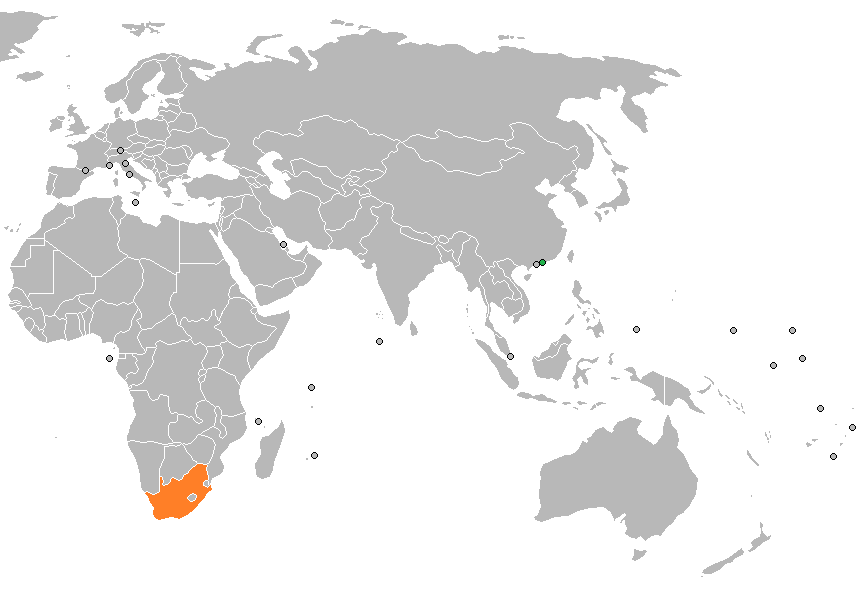
- Hong Kong: South Africa

Hong Kong–South Africa relations refers to the current and historical relationship between Hong Kong, a Special Administrative Region (SAR) of the People's Republic of China, and the Republic of South Africa.

South Africa and Hong Kong are former British colonies, with English as one of their official languages, which has been a factor in South African companies using Hong Kong as a hub for expansion into Mainland China.

South Africa is represented in Hong Kong by a Consulate General in Wanchai, which is also accredited to Macau. Hong Kong's trade relations with South Africa are promoted by the Hong Kong Trade Development Council office in Johannesburg.

== History ==
=== Under apartheid ===
Hong Kong–South Africa relations
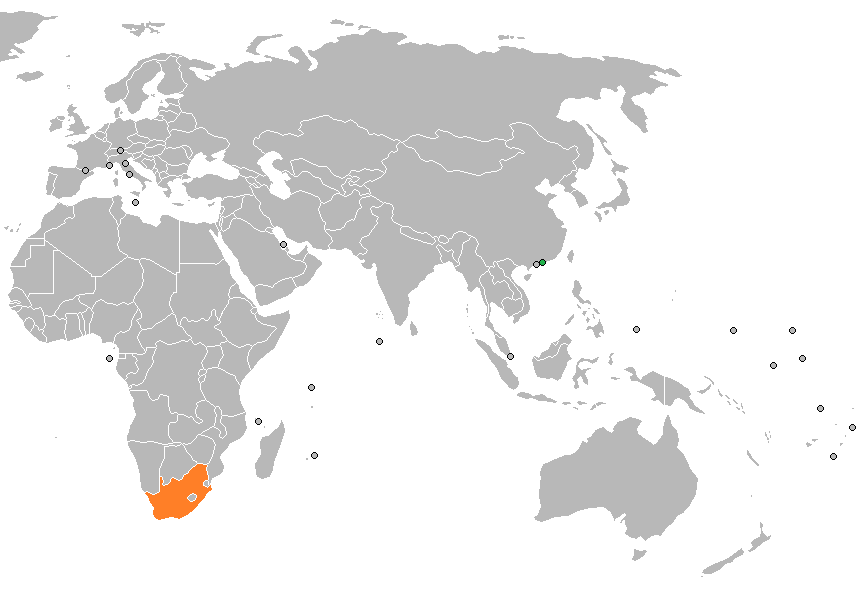

- Hong Kong: South Africa

South Africa has had trade ties with Hong Kong from the time when it was under British administration, and it did not recognise the People's Republic of China, instead recognising the Republic of China on Taiwan. At the time, South Africa was under apartheid, but it encouraged trade and investment from Hong Kong as well as Japan.

In order to accommodate Asian investors, the South African government created an "honorary white" status, exempting them from restrictions imposed on other non-whites, including the local Chinese community. It later offered generous incentives and subsidies to Taiwanese, and some Hong Kongers, to settle and invest in South Africa.

Pretoria initially appointed a representative in Hong Kong in the 1960s, known as the Trade Commissioner for the Republic of South Africa. In the 1970s, this was replaced by a Consulate General, which was also responsible for trade relations with Thailand and the Republic of China on Taiwan.

South African Airways also began weekly flights between Johannesburg's Jan Smuts Airport and Hong Kong's Kai Tak via Plaisance Airport in Mauritius. Later in 1991, as sanctions were lifted and trade and tourism began to increase, Cathay Pacific also began flights on the same route.

Hong Kong, despite then being linked to the Commonwealth as a British colony, did not comply with its measures against South Africa. Instead, like Britain, it only imposed unilateral sanctions, banning the imports of Krugerrands, iron and steel until 1991.

=== Post apartheid ===
Following the end of apartheid in 1994, and the coming to power of the African National Congress, there were concerns regarding future ties between South Africa and Hong Kong, given that Britain was due to transfer sovereignty of the territory to China in 1997. As Hong Kong had been under British administration, South Africa was able to maintain a consulate by virtue of its diplomatic relations with Britain.

The South African government was concerned that after the handover Beijing might downgrade its consulate and the country would no longer be allowed to use Hong Kong as a transit route for air traffic and trade with the rest of the region. In addition, the leadership of the South African Communist Party, many of whom held important positions in the new government, were strongly in support of shifting recognition to Beijing.

In December 1996, South Africa announced it would end relations with Taiwan in favour of the People's Republic of China in January 1998. Under a transitional arrangement, it was able to maintain its consulate in Hong Kong for an interim six-month period, until relations with Beijing were finally established, while existing air services were temporarily retained.

== Trade ==
In 2002, South Africa was ranked Hong Kong's 32nd largest trading partner, with exports including iron and steel, pearls, precious and semi-precious stones, fruit and nuts, aluminium and non-ferrous base metal waste and scrap. In the same period, Hong Kong's exports to South Africa included watches and clocks, textile yarn, fabrics, electronic parts and accessories, telecommunications equipment and polymers of styrene.

South African companies have established seven regional offices and twelve local offices in Hong Kong, which include those of Standard Bank, South African Airways, steel supplier Macsteel, fruit company Metspan, paper company Sappi Trading, energy company Sasol Chemical Pacific, financial services company Sasfin Asia and brewery SAB Miller.

Hong Kong's exports to South Africa were US$547 million in the first seven months of 2015, while imports from South Africa were US$677 million in the same period.

In 2014, Hong Kong and South Africa signed a Comprehensive Double Taxation Agreement for the avoidance of double taxation and tax evasion, the 31st such agreement concluded by Hong Kong.

== See also ==
- Foreign relations of Hong Kong
- Foreign relations of South Africa
