= A. Brian Albritton =

American attorney

United States Attorney for the Middle District of Florida
- In office October 15, 2008 – October 5, 2010
- President: George W. Bush
- Preceded by: Paul I. Perez
- Succeeded by: Robert E. O'Neill

Personal details
- Political party: [Unknown]

A. Brian Albritton is an American attorney who served as the United States Attorney for the Middle District of Florida from 2008 to 2010.
