= Warren B. Hamilton =

American geologist

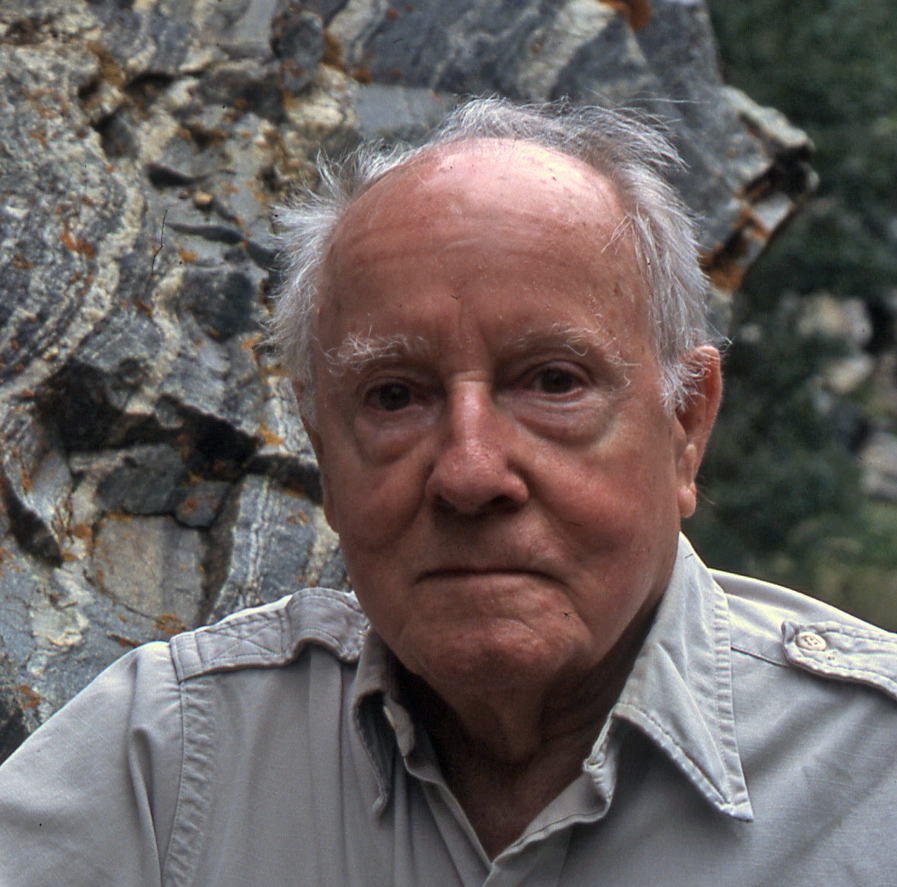
Warren Hamilton in Colorado, 2007

Warren B. Hamilton (May 13, 1925 – October 26, 2018) was an American geologist known for integrating observed geology and geophysics into planetary-scale syntheses describing the dynamic and petrologic evolution of Earth's crust and mantle. His primary career (1952–1995) was as a research scientist with the US Geological Survey (USGS) in geologic, then geophysical, branches. After retirement, he became a Distinguished Senior Scientist in the Department of Geophysics, Colorado School of Mines (CSM). He was a member of the National Academy of Sciences, and a holder of the Penrose Medal, highest honor of the Geological Society of America (GSA). Hamilton served in the US Navy from 1943 to 1946, completed a bachelor's degree at the University of California, Los Angeles (UCLA) in a Navy training program in 1945, and was a commissioned officer on the aircraft carrier USS Tarawa. After returning to civilian life, he earned an MSc in geology from the University of Southern California in 1949, and a PhD in geology from UCLA in 1951. He married Alicita V. Koenig (1926–2015) in 1947. Hamilton died in October 2018 at the age of 93; until the last few weeks he was working on new research. His final paper, "Toward a myth-free geodynamic history of Earth and its neighbors," was published posthumously (2019) in Earth-Science Reviews. In 2022 the Geological Society of America published an edited volume in his honor, with 33 papers: In the Footsteps of Warren B. Hamilton: New Ideas in Earth Science. The first chapter of this book describes how Hamilton's last paper was written; the second applies Thomas Kuhn's model of scientific change to interpreting Hamilton's career.

== Early career ==
Following a year, 1951–1952, teaching at the University of Oklahoma, Hamilton began his principal career as a research scientist with the USGS in Denver (1952–1995). Early projects included field and laboratory work in the Sierra Nevada batholith, the Idaho batholith and what later became known as accreted terranes west of it, metamorphic rocks of east Tennessee, a major crustal-extension earthquake in Montana, and extreme deformation of cratonic strata in southeast California.

== Antarctic insights ==
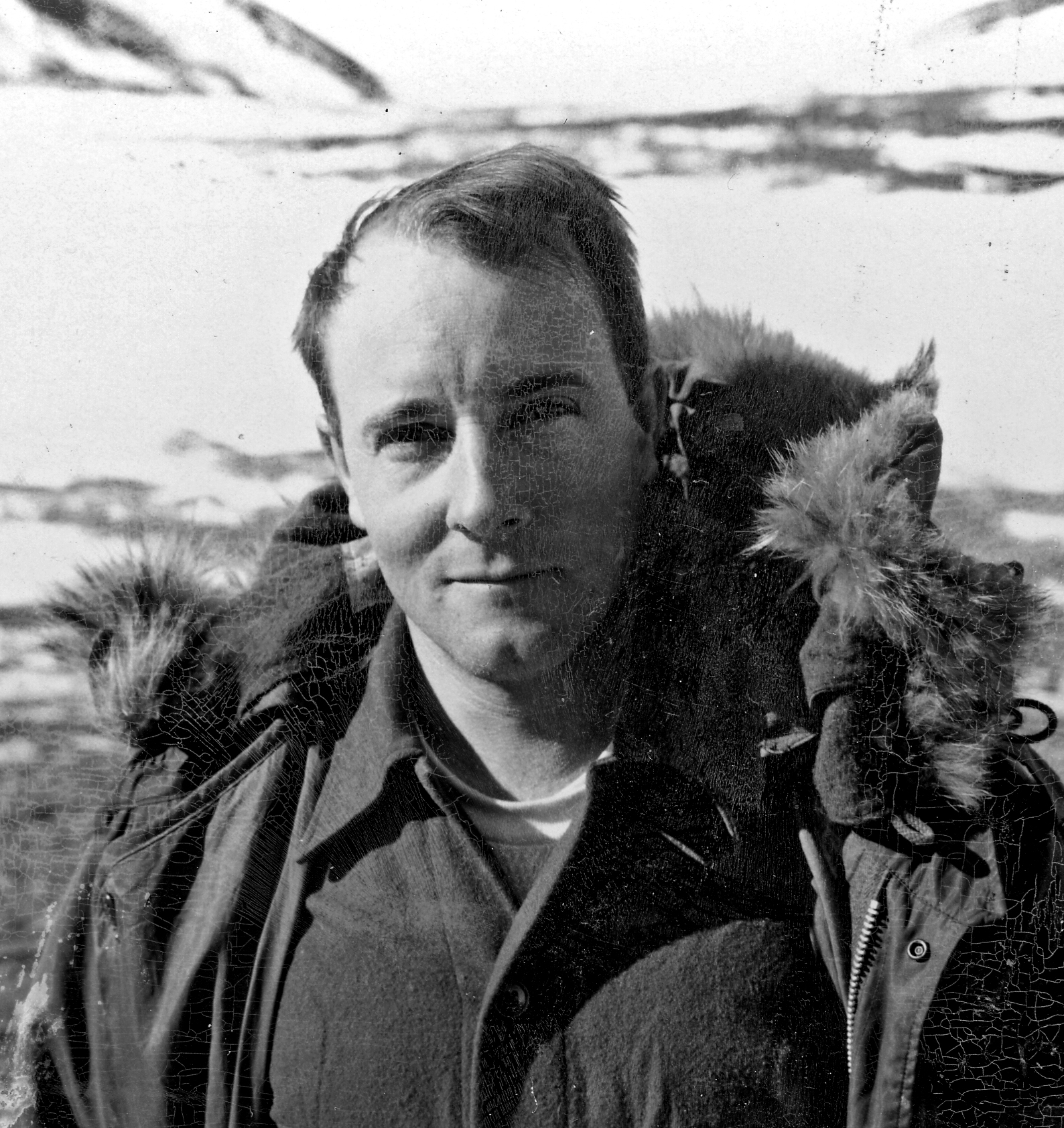
Warren Hamilton in Antarctica, 1958

Hamilton led a two-man field party in Antarctica (October 1958–January 1959) for the International Geophysical Year, and launched a new understanding of Antarctica. He was the first to apply the name trans-Antarctic Mountains (two years later, formalized as Transantarctic Mountains) to that 3,500 km range. Hamilton recognized that a large sector of this range contained distinctive granitic rocks like South Australia's Adelaide orogenic belt. Associated fossils of diverse ages in Antarctica, Australia, and southernmost Africa further linked these continents, and supported then-radical explanations of continental drift. Before traveling to Antarctica, Hamilton was what he later described as a "closet drifter," aware that Southern Hemisphere geology provided powerful evidence favoring continental drift. He returned to Antarctica for fieldwork in 1963 and 1964 in other parts of the Transantarctic Mountains, including those once continuous with other Australian tracts. He also investigated in the field evidence for drift in Australia and South Africa, integrating his work with that of other researchers to show how Antarctica and other Gondwana continents had drifted apart.

== Continental Drift to Plate Tectonics ==
Continental mobility was important also to Hamilton's research in western North America in the 1960s, at a time when lateral motions were rejected by most northern hemisphere geoscientists. He recognized that Baja California had pulled away from Mexico, opening the Gulf of California, as components of the San Andreas Fault system. He studied the petrology and mobile settings of several volcanic provinces, and variations in magmatic complexes in relation to their depths of formation. He was first to recognize that both ocean floors and island arcs were incorporated in continental orogenic complexes (although the mechanism was not then clear) and could be discriminated petrologically, and that the Basin and Range region had doubled in width by crustal extension. Geoscience historian Henry Frankel characterized Hamilton as "the most active North American mobilist who developed his ideas independently of contemporaneous advances in paleomagnetism and oceanography."

In the late 1960s, geophysicists working with new technologies of marine magnetic surveying and earthquake seismology proved the operation of seafloor spreading, devised explanations with the new concepts of plate tectonics, and showed that ocean floors and mobile continents jointly formed tectonic plates. Hamilton was a pioneer in showing how land geology also had evolved by plate interactions, like those now active, for which submarine evidence was newly generated. He published in 1969 and 1970 syntheses of the evolution of California, and of much of the Soviet Union, as controlled by converging tectonic plates. He "paved new paths for the structure and tectonics community to integrate plate-tectonic concepts and on-land geology."

== Top-Down Plate Tectonics ==
Hamilton was invited in 1969 to make a plate-tectonic analysis of Indonesia and surrounding regions, funded by the US Department of State, to aid petroleum exploration ramping up there. This large region is the most complex part of the Earth wherein small oceans still intervene between complexly interacting plates so that many separate mobile histories can be deciphered. He integrated onshore geology with offshore geophysics, most of it previously unstudied. Resulting publications include wall maps, many articles, and a large monograph. This work contained new understanding of convergent-plate interactions, with observations showing that plate boundaries change shapes and move relative to most others. Hinges roll back into subducting oceanic plates which sink broadside, not down their inclined dips. These sinking plates, and not the conventionally pictured rising mantle-convection cells, control surface-plate motions. Arcs advance toward each other over sinking slabs and collide; new subduction breaks through outside the new aggregates. Oceanic lithosphere thickens with age away from spreading centers because it is chilled from the top, becoming denser than hotter material beneath it, and therefore capable of sinking (the process of subduction). Oceanic plates are propelled by their mass, and their commonly inclined basal boundaries, toward subduction exits from the surface. William Dickinson reported that this "magnificent monograph on Indonesian tectonics includes the first regional tectonic map to depict the whole of a classic orogenic region in the framework of plate tectonics." Keith Howard described it as "a standard of comparison for countless newer studies of subduction belts worldwide."

Hamilton's other work of the 1970s through early '90s was also aimed at understanding the evolution of continental crust. He concentrated on the geology and crustal geophysics that define the products of the last 540 million years of Earth history (the Phanerozoic eon), throughout which plate tectonics had produced convergent-plate geologic assemblages like those forming today. He traveled extensively to study rock complexes of varying types, ages, and depths of formation, including two that exposed the Mohorovičić discontinuity between crustal and mantle rocks of magmatic arcs. He accepted 5 visiting professorships, and also gave many invited short courses and lectures around the world.

Hamilton's emphasis on empirical evidence kept him at odds with conventional explanations. Although many geoscientists adopted mobilistic viewpoints as seafloor spreading was documented, most of them did so with the assumption that plates are passive passengers on convection systems driven by heating from the bottom. This speculation still dominates theoretical geodynamics. Hamilton argued that this view is incompatible with information on actual plate interactions, and with much other evidence from physics and geoscience.

== Alternative Earth and Terrestrial Planets ==
In 1996, Hamilton moved to the Department of Geophysics at Colorado School of Mines, continuing research with some teaching. He worked at multidisciplinary integration of data on whole-Earth geophysics and mantle evolution, understanding the kinematics of plate tectonics, interpreting the profound contrasts between the rock assemblages and relationships produced by Phanerozoic plate tectonics and those of the first four billion years of Earth history, and integrating those insights with new interpretations of evolution of the terrestrial planets. These broad topics were advanced in parallel, as can be seen from the list of his publications. Major themes were updated and summarized in a 2015 paper.

The widely accepted explanations for the dynamics and internal evolution of Earth and its neighbors are still based on speculations from the 1970s and 1980s. These assume slow net separation of continental crust from mantles that are still mostly unfractionated and are vigorously undergoing convection in the same bottom-driven fashions, and yet produce different shallow and surface effects on each planet.

Hamilton developed radically new interpretations by re-evaluating the bases for those conventional assumptions independently for Earth, Venus, Mars, and Earth's Moon. In his view, these assumptions are contrary both to empirical knowledge and to physical principles, including the second law of thermodynamics. Independent evidence for each planet indicates growth of each to essentially full size, with magmatically separated mantle and mafic crust, no later than about 4.50 billion years (b.y.) ago. The heat source for melting synchronously with accretion remains unclear, however. Uranium, Thorium and Potassium 40, suggested in Hamilton's 2015 paper, were inadequate for the task. Those elements all partition selectively into melts, however, and so were concentrated in the protocrusts and their derivatives, wherein the radioisotopes increased shallow temperatures while producing non-convecting lower mantles.

== Mechanisms of Plate Tectonics ==
Conventional plate-tectonic hypotheses differ in detail, but since the 1980s most have assumed that Earth has operated in a plate-tectonic mode, with plume-based whole-mantle convection driven by an eternally hot core, for at least 3 b.y., and that this convection has kept the mantle stirred and mostly unfractionated. A minority of geoscientists, including Hamilton, contends instead that most components and predictions for such convection have been disproved, and none robustly confirmed. Their alternative explanation involves plate motions driven by top-down cooling and sinking, with mid-plate volcanics such as the Hawaiian Islands reflecting crustal weakness (like a propagating crack) decreasing pressure on asthenosphere already at or close to melting temperatures, rather than plumes of hot material rising from deep in the mantle.

Hamilton's model integrates plate behavior with multidisciplinary geophysics, and has the 3-D circulation of plate tectonics entirely confined to the upper mantle, above the profound seismic discontinuity at a depth of about 660 km. Subducting slabs sink subvertically—they are not injected down inclined slots—and their hinges migrate into inbound oceanic lithosphere. The sinking slabs are laid down flat on the impenetrable "660," are overpassed by upper mantle and overriding plates pulled toward the retreating slabs, and fill the potential spreading gaps (e.g., Atlantic Ocean, and Pacific backarc basins) behind overriding plates. On their oceanward sides, the broadside-sinking slabs push the entire upper mantle, above the "660" and beneath incoming oceanic plates, back under those plates, forcing rapid spreading in their oceans (e.g., the fast-spreading Pacific) even as those oceans are narrowed between advancing subduction systems and overriding plates.

== Precambrian tectonics ==
Mainstream literature on Earth's Precambrian geology—the Archean (4.0-2.5 b.y. ago), and Proterozoic (2.5-0.54 b.y.) eons—has been dominated since the 1980s by the concept that plate-tectonic and "plume" processes, like those thought to be operating now, were then active, and that Earth's thermal structure and geodynamics have varied relatively little through time.

Hamilton, however, saw, in either published accounts by others or in his own multicontinental fieldwork, no rocks or assemblages older than late Proterozoic that resemble the products of more recent plate tectonics. Geological evidence for earlier plate tectonics is lacking. Most Archean volcanic and granitic rocks are strikingly different in bulk compositions and occurrences from Phanerozoic ones (0.54-0 b.y. ago), even those that bear the same broad lithologic names. This lack is tacitly acknowledged by the dependence of conventional assignments of individual rock specimens to plate-tectonic settings on the basis of similarities between the ratios of ratios of a few trace elements, and those of selected modern rocks of quite different bulk compositions, assemblages, and occurrences. Both field relationships and chemical compositions of Archean mafic lavas show that they were erupted through and upon older continental granitic rocks, and did not form as oceanic crust as postulated in plate interpretations. Clear evidence for plate tectonics has been found only in rocks less than 650 million years old.

The pre-4.50 b.y. high upper-mantle rocks, the dominant rocks now preserved beneath Archean cratons, are not of partially-fractionated mantle as predicted by conventional interpretations, but instead are extremely refractory differentiates, depleted of most silicate materials that could have contributed partial melts of either continental or oceanic crustal rocks. These early-fractionated mantle rocks were originally capped directly by a thick mafic crust that contained the potential subsequent crustal components, including a large proportion of Earth's major heat-producing elements. At about 4.0 b.y., Earth received, via a barrage of icy bolides initially formed in the outer part of the asteroid belt, the volatile components that evolved into its oceans and atmosphere. Downward cycling of volatiles enabled hydrous partial melting of protocrust to begin, forming a distinctive non-plate-tectonic granitic crust atop residual protocrust. The quite different geologic assemblages of the Archean and Proterozoic eons are explained in terms of variable radiogenic partial melting of the protocrust, after hydration began, to form granitic and volcanic melts that rose from it, and of delamination and sinking of residual protocrust, densified by loss of its lighter components, that began a long-continuing process of re-enriching the upper mantle, and that ultimately enabled plate tectonics.

== Terrestrial planets ==
Hamilton's 2015 paper summarized data indicating that Venus and Mars, like Earth, had fractionated crusts, mantles, and cores very early, but, unlike Earth, both preserve on their surfaces an ancient bolide-bombardment history like that of the Moon. Almost all observers of Mars recognize this. So did early observers of radar imagery from Venus, but nearly all subsequent interpreters of that planet, unlike Hamilton, have instead attributed most of the thousands of large rimmed circular basins and craters to young mantle plumes. Hamilton emphasized that the direct correlation of gravity fields with topography require most Martian and Venusian topography to be supported by cold, strong upper mantles, and is incompatible with the popularly assumed hot, active mantles. (The very different correlation on Earth shows that topography of similar dimensions here floats isostatically on truly hot, weak mantle.) Purported Venusian and Martian volcanoes, including Olympus Mons, do not resemble Earth's endogenic volcanoes, and instead are roughly circular, and commonly gentle-sided, products of vast masses of spreading melts from single events. They appear to be impact-melt constructs, mostly older than 3.9 b.y. by lunar analogy. Earth records a similar history of impact melting in its zircons from the Hadean eon, 4.5-4.0 b.y. ago.

Both Venus and Mars show in their surface geology the acquisition of huge volumes of water delivered by bolides late in their major-bombardment histories, hence about 4.0 b.y. ago, at about the same time that Earth was hydrated. Unlike Earth, however, the Venus and Mars protocrusts had much earlier chilled to inactivity, so they share none of Earth's dynamic and magmatic history younger than about 4.5 b.y. Evidence for past Martian oceans and severe aqueous erosion is recognized by most observers, although source and timing of the water are debated. Undeformed Venusian oceanic sediments were recognized in Soviet lander optical images of the vast lowland plains, and Hamilton noted much more evidence for oceans, and for deep aqueous erosion, in subsequent radar imagery. Conventional Venusian work since 1990 rejects such evidence as incompatible with the assumption that the Venusian surface is shaped by young plumes, still extremely active; and by these plumes' products, including vast fields of non-earthlike lavas with no visible sources.

== Earth's Moon ==
Earth and its Moon have compositions so similar they must have come from the same body. The common explanation is that the Moon formed from material blasted free by early collision with a Mars-sized body. In his 2015 paper Hamilton argues instead for lunar formation by the generally disfavored option of fissioning, spun off from a still partially molten, and rapidly spinning, young Earth as it reached full size. Slow fractionation of a magma ocean is commonly assumed to have formed lunar highlands, but geochronology, and petrologic problems with that explanation, led Hamilton to suggest that here too whole-planet fractionation was complete by about 4.5 b.y., and subsequent surface magmatism was due to impact melting.

The possibility that water and other volatiles were delivered to the Moon in bolides about 4.0 b.y. accords with available data on volatile contents of igneous rocks but has not been specified in the chemical literature. Earth, Moon, Mars, and Venus thus may all have been recipients of a bombardment of icy bolides, formed originally in the outer half of the asteroid belt, at about this time, which made life on Earth possible. This inference is consistent with current concepts of the formation of asteroids, and of the disruption and loss of most of them, in response to migrations of, particularly, Jupiter, although these concepts carry few constraints on timing.

== Selected publications ==
- Hamilton, W.B., 1956, Variations in plutons of granitic rocks of the Huntington Lake area of the Sierra Nevada, California: GSA Bull., 67, 1585–1598.
- Hamilton, W.B., 1956, Precambrian rocks of Wichita and Arbuckle mountains, Oklahoma: GSA Bull., 67, 1319–1330.
- Hamilton, W.B., 1960, New interpretation of Antarctic tectonics: USGS Prof. Paper 400-B, 379-380
- Hamilton, W.B., 1961, Geology of the Richardson Cove and Jones Cove quadrangles, Tennessee: USGS Prof. Paper 349-A, 55 p. + map.
- Hamilton, W.B., 1961, Origin of the Gulf of California: GSA Bull., 72, 1307–1318.
- Hamilton, W.B., 1963, Overlapping of late Mesozoic orogens in western Idaho: GSA Bull., 74, 779–787.
- Hamilton, W.B., 1963, Antarctic tectonics and continental drift: Soc. Econ. Paleontol. Mineral., Sp. Pub. 10, 74–93.
- Hamilton, W.B., 1963, Metamorphism in the Riggins region, western Idaho: USGS Prof. Paper 436, 95 p. + map.
- Myers, W.B., and W.B. Hamilton, 1964, Deformation accompanying the Hegben Lake earthquake of August 17, 1959: USGS Prof.
- Hamilton, W.B., 1965, Geology and petrogenesis of the Island Park caldera of rhyolite and basalt, eastern Idaho: USGS Prof. Paper 504-C, 37 p. + map.
- Hamilton, W.B., 1965, Diabase sheets of the Taylor Glacier region, Victoria Land, Antarctica: USGS Prof. Paper 456-B, 71 p. + map.
- Hamilton, W.B., and L.C. Pakiser, 1965, Geologic and crustal cross section of the United States along the 37th parallel: USGS Map I-448.
- Hamilton, W.B., 1966, Origin of the volcanic rocks of eugeosynclines and island arcs: Geol. Survey Canada Paper 66–15, 348–356.
- Hamilton, W.B., and W.B. Myers, 1966, Cenozoic tectonics of the western United States: Reviews Geophys., 4, 509–549.
- Hamilton, W.B., 1967, Tectonics of Antarctica, Tectonophysics, 4, 555–568.
- Hamilton, W.B., and D. Krinsley, 1967, Upper Paleozoic glacial deposits of South Africa and southern Australia: GSA Bull., 78, 783–800.
- Hamilton, W.B., and W.B. Myers, 1967, The nature of batholiths: USGS Prof. Paper 554-C, 30 p.
- Hamilton, W. 1969, Mesozoic California and the underflow of Pacific mantle: GSA Bull, 80, 2409–2430.
- Hamilton, W.B., 1969, Reconnaissance geologic map of the Riggins quadrangle, west-central Idaho: USGS Map I-579.
- Hamilton, W.B., 1970, The Uralides and the motion of the Russian and Siberian platforms: GSA Bull., 81, 2553–2576.
- Hamilton, W.B., 1970, Bushveld complex—product of impacts? Geol. Soc. South Africa Spec. Pub. 1, 367–379.
- Hamilton, W.B., 1972, The Hallett volcanic province, Antarctica: USGS Prof. Paper 456-C, 62 p.
- Hamilton, W.B., 1974, Earthquake map of the Indonesian region: USGS Map I-875C.
- Hamilton, W.B., 1978, Mesozoic tectonics of the western United States: Pac. Sec. Soc. Econ. Paleontol. Mineral., Paleogeog. Symp. 2, 33–70.
- Hamilton, W.B. 1979, Tectonics of the Indonesian Region: USGS Prof. Paper 1078, 345 p. (reprinted with minor revisions, 1981)
- Hamilton, W.B., 1981, Tectonic map of the Indonesian region: USGS Map I-875-D, 2nd ed., revised.
- Hamilton, W.B., 1981, Crustal evolution by arc magmatism: Royal Soc. London Philos. Trans., A-30l, no. 1461, 279–291.
- Hamilton, W.B., 1983, Cretaceous and Cenozoic history of the northern continents: Annals Missouri Botan. Garden, 70, 440–458.
- Hamilton, W.B., Mesozoic geology and tectonics of the Big Maria Mountains region, southeastern California: Ariz. Geol. Soc. Digest, 18, 33–47.
- Hamilton, W.B., 1988, Detachment faulting in the Death Valley region: USGS Bull. 1790, 51–85.
- Hamilton, W.B. 1988, Plate tectonics and island arcs: GSA Bull., 100, 1503–1527.
- Hamilton, W.B., 1988, Tectonic setting and variations with depth of some Cretaceous and Cenozoic structural and magmatic systems of the western United States, in W.G. Ernst, ed., Metamorphism and crustal evolution of the western United States: Prentice-Hall, p. 1-40.
- Hamilton, W.B. 1989, Crustal geologic processes of the United States: GSA Mem. 172, 743–782.
- Hamilton, W.B., 1990, On terrane analysis: Royal Soc. London Philos. Trans., A-331, 511–522.
- Hamilton, W.B., 1995, Subduction systems and magmatism: Geol. Soc. London Spec. Pub. 81, 3–28.
- Hamilton, W.B. 1998, Archean magmatism and deformation were not products of plate tectonics: Precambrian Res., 91, 143–179.
- Hamilton, W.B., 2002, The closed upper-mantle circulation of plate tectonics: Amer. Geophys. Union Geodyn. Ser. 30, 359–410.
- Hamilton, W.B., 2005, Plumeless Venus preserves an ancient impact-accretionary surface: GSA Sp. Paper 388, 781–814.
- Hamilton, W.B., 2007, Earth's first two billion years—the era of internally mobile crust: GSA Mem. 200, 233–296.
- Hamilton, W.B., 2007, Driving mechanism and 3-D circulation of plate tectonics: GSA Sp. Paper 433, 1–25.
- Hamilton, W.B., 2007, An alternative Venus: GSA Sp. Paper 430, 879–911.
- Hamilton, W.B., 2011, Plate tectonics began in Neoproterozoic time, and plumes from deep mantle have never operated: Lithos, 123, 1–20.
- Hamilton, W.B., 2013, Evolution of the Archean Mohorovicic discontinuity from a synaccretionary 4.5 Ga protocrust: Tectonophysics, 609, 706–733.
- Hamilton, W.B., 2015, Terrestrial planets fractionated synchronously with accretion, but Earth progressed through subsequent internally dynamic stages whereas Venus and Mars have been inert for more than 4 billion years: GSA Sp. Paper 514 and Amer. Geophys. Union Sp. Pub. 71, 123–156.
- Hamilton, W.B., 2019, Toward a myth-free geodynamic history of Earth and its neighbors: Earth-Science Reviews, 198, 102905.

== Major honors ==
- Hon. Fellow, Geol. Soc. London; Fellow, GSA, and Geol. Assoc. Canada
- 1967, Natl. Acad. Sci. Senior Exchange Scientist to USSR
- 1968, 1978, Visiting Prof., Scripps Inst. Oceanography/UCSD
- 1973, Meritorious Service Award, USGS
- 1973, Visiting Prof., California Inst. Technology;
- 1979, Member, Nat. Acad. Sci. Plate Tectonics Delegation to China and Tibet
- 1980, Visiting Prof., Yale Univ.
- 1981, Distinguished Service Medal, US Dept. Interior
- 1981, Visiting Prof., Univ. Amsterdam and Free Univ. Amsterdam (joint appt.)
- 1989, Penrose Medal, GSA
- 1989, Elected Member, National Academy of Sciences
- 2007, Structural Geology and Tectonics Career Contribution Award, GSA
