= Yarrabubba impact structure =

Impact structure in Western Australia

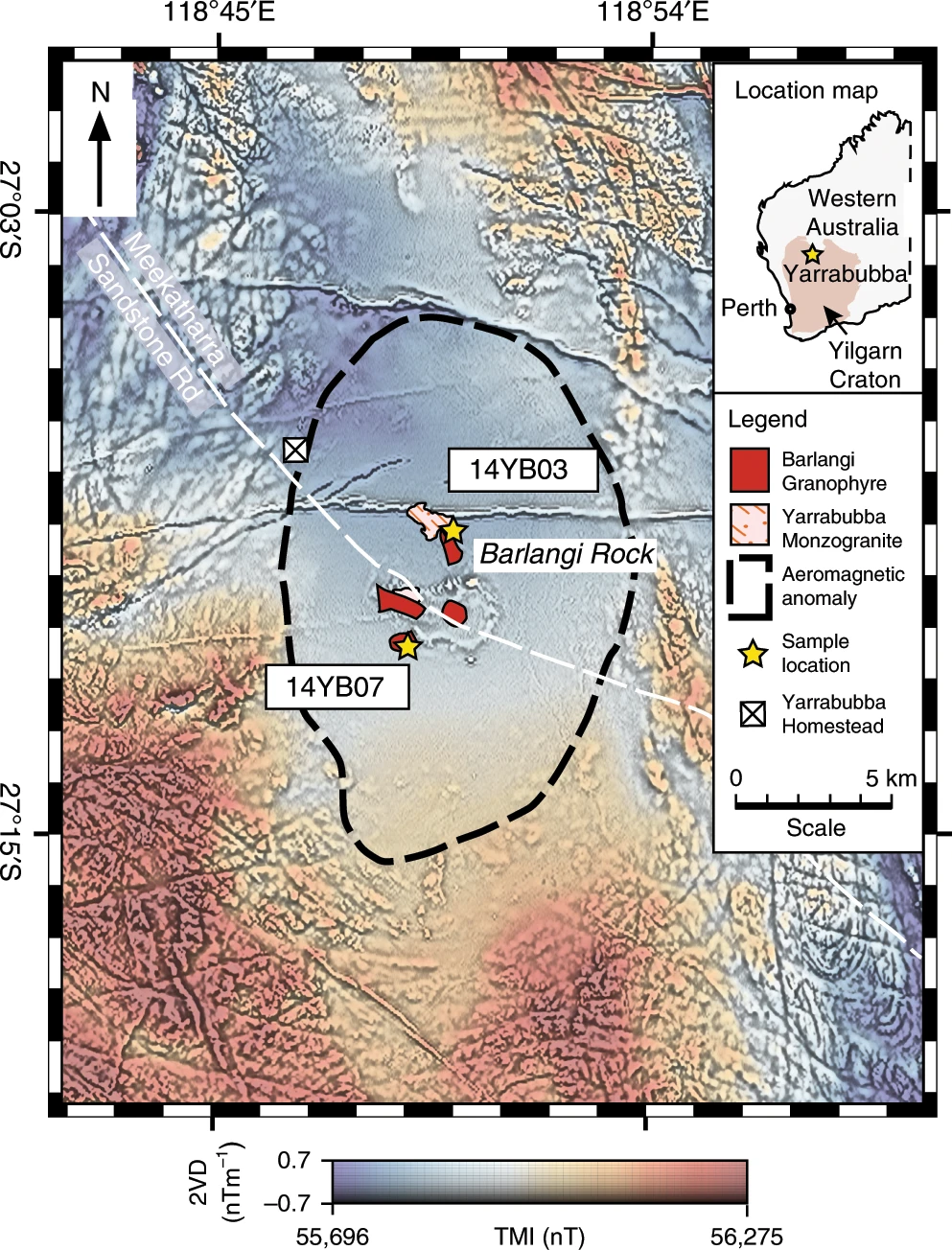
- Composite aeromagnetic anomaly map of the Yarrabubba impact structure

- Location within Western Australia
- Location: Yilgarn craton, Shire of Meekatharra, Western Australia, Australia; 27°10′56″S 118°50′04″E

Impact crater structure
- Confidence: Confirmed
- Diameter: 30–70 km (19–43 mi)
- Age: 2229 Ma ± 5 Ma; Rhyacian, Paleoproterozoic
- Exposed: Yes
- Drilled: No

The Yarrabubba impact structure is the eroded remnant of an impact crater, situated in the northern Yilgarn craton near Yarrabubba Station between the towns of Sandstone and Meekatharra, Mid West Western Australia. With an age of 2.229 ± 0.005 billion years, as of 2026, it is the oldest known impact structure on Earth of confident age.

== Description ==
While the rim of the original crater has been completely eroded and is not readily visible on aerial or satellite images, it is centered on a feature called the Barlangi Rock. The evidence for the extent of impact comes from the presence of shocked quartz and shatter cones in outcrops of granite interpreted to be near the centre of the original crater, and from geophysical data. The diameter of the original crater is uncertain, but has been estimated to be from 30 to 70 km (19 to 43 mi). Computer simulations of a 7-kilometre-diameter (4.3 mi) diameter impactor crashing into a 2-kilometre-thick (1.2 mi) ice sheet covering granite bedrock produced a crater of final diameter compatible with the Yarrabubba crater.

=== Age ===
The impact has been dated to 2,229 ± 5 million years ago, making it one of the world's oldest confirmed impact structures. This date places the impact in the early Rhyacian, around the end of the Huronian glaciation.

The age finding was based on analysis of ancient crystals of the minerals zircon and monazite found in the crater. Scientists used uranium–lead dating to analyze the samples and to determine the age of the impact crater.

At the time of its dating in 2020, it was the oldest known impact structure on Earth. In 2025, it was demoted to being the second-oldest known impact crater, after shatter cones in the Miralga impact structure, also in Western Australia, were found to be 3.47 billion years old, over a billion years older. The dating of this impact structure was later challenged, with a subsequent study suggesting that the impact happened considerably later, sometimes between 2.7 billion and 400 million years ago. A second study in 2026 found the Miralga impact structure to be 3.024 billion years old, which, if correct would once again make it the oldest.

== See also ==
- List of impact craters on Earth
