= Claude C. Albritton =

Claude C. Albritton Jr. (1913–1988) was a geologist, professor, author, and university administrator. He had an academic career at Southern Methodist University (SMU) where he retired as Warren B. Hamilton Professor of Geology.

== Education and career ==
Albritton graduated from Southern Methodist University with an AB and BS in 1933. He then went to Harvard University to earn the AM and PhD in 1936. He was the Jay Backus Woodworth fellow at Harvard.

He joined the Department of Geology at Southern Methodist University in 1936.

He took leave from the university during World War II to serve with the U.S. Geological Survey, Military Geology Branch and Strategic Minerals Branch from 1942 to 1949.

Returning to SMU after the War he was promoted to professor and became Dean of the College Arts and Sciences, 1952–1957. He was named Warren B. Hamilton Professor of Geology in 1955.

Other administrative positions Albritton held at SMU were director of the graduate research center from 1961 to 1964, director of the Scientific Information Institute, 1964–72, and Dean of libraries, 1973–78. As Dean of libraries and Vice Provost for Library Development he supported construction of the N.L. Heroy Science Hall and the Science Information Center and expansion of the SMU library system including DeGolyer Western Library.

In 1966 Albritton co-founded the Institute for the Study of Earth and Man (ISEM) at SMU. He served as Senior scientist.

He retired from teaching in 1979.

== Awards and honors ==
- Phi Beta Kappa
- Archaeological Geology Division Award
- Memorial Issue.1989. History of the Earth Sciences Society
- Mary C. Rabbitt History and Philosophy of Geology Award 1983.
- National Book Award. Finalist, 1981 for The Abyss of Time.
- Claude C. Albritton Jr. Award- established to honor the memory of Albritton, Fellow of the Geological Society of America and a founding member of the Geoarchaeology Division.
- A.S.W. Rosenbach Lectures in Bibliography. "Toward the Discovery of Time: Landmarks in Historical Geology." (1970).

== Selected publications ==
- 1990. (with Brooks, James E., and others) "Origin of the Qattara Depression, Egypt." Geological Society of America Bulletin v. 102,: 952–960.
- 1989. Albritton, Claude C. Catastrophic Episodes in Earth History. London: Chapman and Hall.
- 1980. Albritton, Claude C. The Abyss of Time, Changing Conceptions of the Earth’s Antiquity After the Sixteenth Century. San Francisco, CA: Freeman, Cooper.
- 1975. Albritton, Claude C., editor. Philosophy of Geohistory, 1785-1970. . Stroudsburg, Pa: Dowden, Hutchinson & Ross.
- 1978. Albritton, Claude C, and Peter William Bretsky. History of Geology. New York: Arno Press.
- 1967. Albritton, Claude C. editor, Geological Society of America, M. King Hubbert, Leonard G Wilson, Norman D Newell, and Nelson Goodman. 1967. Uniformity and Simplicity: A Symposium on the Principle of the Uniformity of Nature. New York: Geological Society of America.
- 1963. Albritton, Claude C. editor, Geological Society of America. 1963. The Fabric of Geology. Reading, Mass: Addison-Wesley.
- 1955. Albritton, Claude C., Wendorf, Fred, and Krieger, A D. The Midland discovery—A report on the Pleistocene human remains from Midland, Texas. Austin, University of Texas Press.
- 1942. Albritton, Claude C. "Dinosaur tracks near Comanche, Texas." Field and Laboratory, v. 10: 160–181.
- 1943. Albritton, Claude C. and Bryan, Kirk. Soil phenomena as evidence of climatic changes: American Journal of Science, v. 241, p. 469-490.
- 1939. Albritton, Claude C. and Bryan, Kirk. "Quaternary stratigraphy in the Davis Mountains, Trans-Pecos Texas." Geological Society of America Bulletin, v. 50, p. 1423-1474.
- 1936. Albritton, Claude C. and Boon, J. D. "Meteorite craters and their possible relationship to cryptovolcanic structures." Field and Laboratory v. 5, p. 1-9.
