= Austin Downs =

Pastoral lease in Western Australia

Coordinates: 27°22′57.2″S 117°44′43.6″E

Location in Western Australia

Austin Downs Station or Austin Downs is a pastoral lease in the Mid West region of Western Australia.

== Description ==
The property covers an area of 160,000 hectares (395,369 acres) and has traditionally farmed sheep for the production of wool. The station is located in the Murchison region of Western Australia; the nearest town is Cue, 17 kilometres (11 mi) to the south east of the homestead. An area of 118 square kilometres (46 sq mi) within the station is composed of reserves and crown land. The soil has a low level of erosion, with 96% of the land being described as nil or minor. The perennial vegetation condition is good with 15% of vegetation cover being described as poor or very poor. The station contains part of Lake Austin and close to Nallan Creek.

The station land includes Walga Rock, a large granite monolith.

== History ==
128 bales of greasy wool from the station were sold in London in 1910 at 11d. per pound. Later the same year a bank clerk named Studds from Cue committed suicide on the property and was found several weeks later with his revolver still in his hand.

In 1911 a 70-year-old man from the Day Dawn goldfields, Jimmy the Fiddler, left the station in very hot weather and was found a week later 7 miles (11 km) from a well. He was thought to have died of dehydration.

By 1912 the station had a flock of 10,000 sheep that were to be sheared in early August using nine stands.

The station suffered some damage during an intense storm in 1914, when some out-buildings were destroyed by the wind. J. P. Meehan reported that 2.5 inches (64 mm) rain fell in 20 minutes and several trees were hit by lightning.

In 1918 the station shore 28,000 sheep and in 1921 the second shearing of the season saw 8,000 shorn for 214 bales of wool.

During the 1919 season two men were struck down with influenza and Meehan took them to Cue for treatment. Upon arrival the men were isolated at the Cue State School. Another man was taken from the station to join them a few days later. Five other men remained at the station but confined to bed for several days. Shearing operations were suspended until the men recovered.

The Meehans cut out 15,500 sheep, including 1,200 lambs, for 279 bales of wool in 1925; the following year 10,000 sheep were shorn for 238 bales of wool.

Leslie Keamy, the prominent merino stud breeder and owner of Cardo Station, once held an interest in Austin Downs and Yarraquin Station.

A flash-flood washed through the area following heavy thunderstorms on New Year's Day in 1929. The rain broke drought conditions and refilled both the nearby Wire Pool and then flowed through the station onward to Lake Austin.

In 1929 the station cut out 16,081 sheep for 377 bales on the first clip with lambs and stragglers to be collected for a second.

The station experienced some flooding when 2.6 inches (66 mm) of rain fell in 1933.

Flooding occurred on the property in 1934 following heavy downpours, 1.2 inches (30 mm) of rain was recorded in a day at the station with heavier falls at surrounding properties. The crossing at Wire Pool was at a record level and all surrounding roads were rendered impassable.

The station is the subject of a book The Station at Austin Downs written by Jo Jackson King.

After two years of drought, one of the longest dry spells on record, the area received rains in 2010.

By 2010 the lessee was the Jackson family under the management of Tom Jackson. Austin Downs is operating under the Crown Lease number CL192-1972 and has the Land Act number LA3114/600.

== See also ==
- List of ranches and stations
- List of pastoral leases in Western Australia
