= Horseshoe, Western Australia =

Abandoned town in Western Australia

Horseshoe
- Town
- Interactive map of Horseshoe
- Coordinates: 25.454°S 118.576°E
- Country: Australia
- State: Western Australia
- LGA: Shire of Meekatharra
- Location: 897 km (557 mi) NNE of Perth; 126 km (78 mi) north of Meekatharra
- Established: 1901

Government
  - State electorate: North West
  - Federal division: Durack
- Elevation: 568 m (1,864 ft)

Horseshoe is an abandoned town in Western Australia located in the Murchison goldfields within the Mid West region of Western Australia situated between Meekatharra and Newman. The town is adjacent to the Peak Hill goldfields.

== History ==
Gold was discovered in the immediate area in 1897 and the government had an area thought to be suitable for a townsite surveyed in 1898. The area proved to not be satisfactory to the locals who wanted another area to be used. The new area was surveyed and the town was gazetted in 1901.

The population of the town was 60 (60 males and no females) in 1898.

The town was often known as Horseshoe Bend as a result of one of the original leases in the area was the shape of a horseshoe. It was also commonly known as The Shoe.

The townsite is one of many ghost towns in the area; others include: Peak Hill, Gabanintha, Abbotts and Garden Gully.

== See also ==
- Meekatharra to Horseshoe railway line
