= Abbotts, Western Australia =

Abandoned town in Western Australia

Abbotts
- Town
- Interactive map of Abbotts
- Coordinates: 26°19′26″S 118°23′20″E
- Country: Australia
- State: Western Australia
- LGA: Shire of Meekatharra
- Location: 802 km (498 mi) north east of Perth; 31 km (19 mi) north west of Meekatharra; 354 km (220 mi) south of Paraburdoo
- Established: 1900

Government
  - State electorate: North West
  - Federal division: Durack
- Elevation: 526 m (1,726 ft)
- Postcode: 6642

Abbotts is an abandoned town in Western Australia located in the Murchison Goldfields region of Western Australia and 31 km (19 mi) north-west of Meekatharra on the Meekatharra – Mount Clere Road.

The townsite was initially established in 1898 and gazetted in 1900, and is named after an immigrant prospector from Croatia named Vincent Vranjican who had changed his name to Vincent Abbott in 1893.

One of the earliest mines to open was the Black Iguana. In 1895 the Black Iguana and the Abbotts mine were both operating ten head stamp mills in the town for processing ore.

In 1902, all of the boarders at Abbott's Hotel were poisoned by eating tinned beetroot; many of the victims were given emetics, which were administered "with much success". No fatalities were recorded from the incident.

The townsite is one of many ghost towns in the area; others include Peak Hill, Gabanintha, Horseshoe and Garden Gully.
