= List of State Register of Heritage Places in the Shire of Meekatharra =

List of heritage sites in Western Australia

The State Register of Heritage Places is maintained by the Heritage Council of Western Australia. As of 2026, 102 places are heritage-listed in the Shire of Meekatharra, of which three are on the State Register of Heritage Places.

== List ==
The Western Australian State Register of Heritage Places, as of 2026, lists the following three state registered places within the Shire of Meekatharra:

Place name	Place #	Street number	Street name	Suburb or town	Co-ordinates	Notes & former names	Photo
Presbyterian Church, Meekatharra	1529	75	Darlot Street	Meekatharra	26.593376°S 118.498783°E	St Oswald's Anglican Church	
Masonic Lodge (former), Meekatharra	1530	80	Darlot Street	Meekatharra	26.593684°S 118.497779°E	RAOB Hall, Royal Antediluvian Order of Buffaloes Lodge	
Bundi Club	1531	58	Darlot Street	Meekatharra	26.59139°S 118.49879°E	Courthouse and Mining Registrar's Office (former)	
