= Meekatharra to Horseshoe railway line =

Former railway line in Western Australia

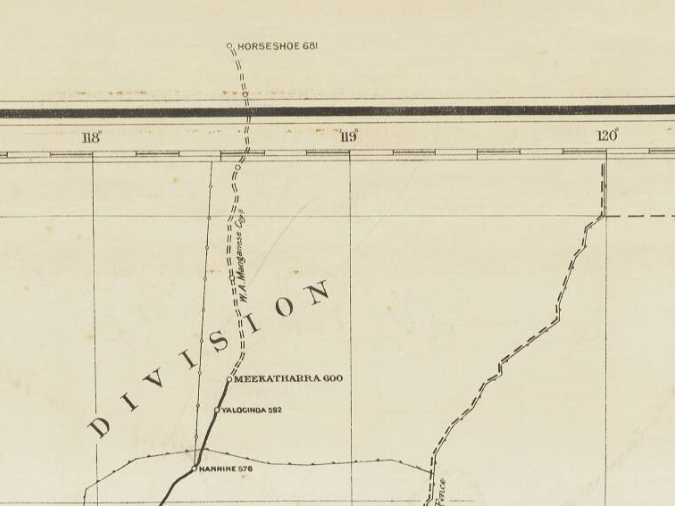
- The railway line on a 1928 map, extending beyond its edge (distances in miles)

Overview
- Status: Closed
- Owner: West Australian Manganese Company Ltd
- Locale: Mid West, Western Australia
- Termini: Meekatharra; Peak Hill

History
- Opened: 1927
- Closed: 1933

Technical
- Line length: 137 km (85 mi)
- Track gauge: 1,067 mm (3 ft 6 in)
- Meekatharra to Horseshoe railway line Main locations

The Meekatharra to Horseshoe railway line was a 137-kilometre (85 mi) long private railway line in the Mid West region of Western Australia, connecting Meekatharra to the Horseshoe mine, north of Peak Hill. It was operated by the West Australian Manganese Company from 1927 to 1933.

== History ==
The Meekatharra–Horseshoe Railway Act 1920, assented to on 31 December 1920, authorised the construction of the railway line from Meekatharra, where it intersected the Mullewa–Meekatharra railway, to the Horseshoe mine, north-west of Peak Hill, near the former gold mining town of Horseshoe. The private 85-mile-long (137 km) railway was short-lived, existing from 1927 until 1933, when the company mining manganese went into receivership.

The origins of the mine and railway go back to March 1919, when the General Chemical Supply Company was registered with a capital of £A 5,000, at a value of £A 1 per share. On 4 July 1921, the company's capital was increased to £A 10,000, and to £A 30,000 on 8 December 1924. In February 1925, the General Chemical Supply Company acquired the Horseshoe Range deposit.

The General Chemical Supply Company assigned its rights to the West Australian Manganese Company Ltd, which was registered on 15 June 1925, with a value of £A 250,000. No cash was involved in the transaction of the rights, instead the General Chemical Supply Company took out shares in the new company.

Construction of the railway line commenced in June 1927 and was completed in October that year. By 1929, the company was in a difficult financial situation and had to suspend operations in April that year.

The railway line, commonly referred to as the Manganese Railway, ended up owing the Western Australian state government £A 27,500 after having received financial assistance during the construction of the line. In May 1933, the state revoked the concession for the West Australian Manganese Company Ltd to operate. By October 1933, removal of the railway line was in progress, with the government especially interested in the 200,000 railway sleepers the line consisted of, which had been purchased at a price of £A 51,000 by the West Australian Manganese Company.

In 1934, George Lambert, member for the Electoral district of Yilgarn-Coolgardie and a former director of the West Australian Manganese Company Ltd, traced its history and defended the company and the investment in the mine and railway in the Western Australian Legislative Assembly. Lambert stated that he had argued for the construction of a basic and cheaper tramway, similar to the timber railway lines in the state, instead of a railway, but the state government had insisted on a proper railway to be able to use the line for livestock transports as well. The state government made the heavier rails available for the line under a hire and purchase agreement and charged the company accordingly. Lambert criticised the state government for this which, unlike the company directors and shareholders, who made no money out of the company, the government did. At the same time, the port facilities for shipping the mine's ore at Geraldton promised by the state government were never constructed.

The railway line's main purpose was as a mining railway but it also carried livestock and wool throughout its short history. The West Australian Manganese Company Ltd also invested £A 805 in the construction of cattle yards along the railway, despite this being outside their line of business.

During the final years of World War I, just prior to the railway line being proposed, manganese had sold for £A 20 per ton but, a decade later, this had declined to £A 5. One of the reasons Lambert stated for the demise of the company was that the price of manganese had fallen from £A 5 per ton to less than half that amount in 1929 because of deposits in the Soviet Union having been opened up. Ore from the Soviet Union subsequently flooded the market and made the Western Australian mine unprofitable.

In December 1935, the West Australian Manganese Company paid out £A 4,895 to its debenture holders, a final payment as no further assets existed, with the rails and sleepers having been taken over by the state government.

Manganese was eventually mined in the area, at the Horseshoe South mine, which operated from 1948 to 1969 and, again, from 2008 to 2011.
