= Annean Station =

Pastoral lease in Western Australia

Coordinates: 26°52′33.4″S 118°10′21.1″E

Location in Western Australia

Annean Station is a pastoral lease in Western Australia.

The property covers an area of 168,408 hectares (416,145 acres) and has traditionally farmed sheep for the production of wool. The station is located in the Murchison region of Western Australia; the nearest town is Meekatharra, located approximately 45 kilometres (28 mi) to the north east. An area of 4,585 hectares (11,330 acres) within the station is composed of reserves and crown land. The soil has a low level of erosion, with 95% of the land being described as nil or minor. The perennial vegetation condition is good with 15% of vegetation cover being described as poor or very poor.

Initially established in 1882 by the Cruikshank brothers, it was put up for auction in 1896 along with the 11,000 head of sheep, 780 cattle and 110 horses that were grazing the 800,000-acre (323,749 ha) property.

In 1898 three drovers from the station, employed by Jules Gascard, were found dead between Peak Hill and Smith's Station. The drovers were thought to have died of starvation.

The station changed hands at least twice prior to 1909, until the station was purchased by Samuel Elliott, who stocked the station with over 4,500 sheep from Glengarry Station and over 2,300 sheep from Oakabella Station; at least 50 cattle from Glengarry were also purchased from Glengarry. Elliott also put in an additional 100 miles (161 km) of fencing and sunk numerous bores around the property. Elliott was sued later in 1910 by a drover who Elliott had contracted to overland 4,000 sheep from Sherlock Station, near Roebourne, to Annean. Elliott then offered the contract to another drover at a discounted price.

The station was acquired by prominent pastoralist, Sir Ernest Augustus Lee Steere, sometime after 1910. Lee Steere also owned nearby Belele Station which he had acquired in 1888.

The station was managed by a Mr Marchant in 1912. Later the same year the station sheared an estimated 16,000 sheep using eight stands in the shearing shed.

In 1924 the station sold 22 bales of wool (for H.P. Sprigg) at 31 1/2 d.

The lessee in 2010 was the St Barbara Pastoral company; Annean is operating under the Crown Lease number CL343-1967 and has the Land Act number LA3114/686.

The station homestead consists of one main house with several sleeping quarters placed around a garden courtyard. The homestead is situated about 15 miles (24 km) west of the now abandoned townsite of Nannine.

== See also ==
- List of ranches and stations
- List of pastoral leases in Western Australia
