= Acacia xanthocarpa =

Scientific classification
- Kingdom: Plantae
- Clade: Embryophytes
- Clade: Tracheophytes
- Clade: Angiosperms
- Clade: Eudicots
- Clade: Rosids
- Order: Fabales
- Family: Fabaceae
- Subfamily: Caesalpinioideae
- Clade: Mimosoid clade
- Genus: Acacia
- Species: A. xanthocarpa

Binomial name
- Acacia xanthocarpa R.S.Cowan & Maslin
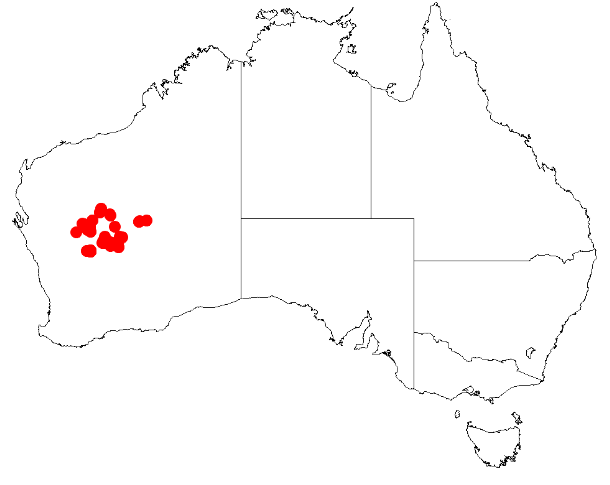
- Occurrence data from AVH

Species of legume

Acacia xanthocarpa is a shrub belonging to the genus Acacia and the subgenus Juliflorae that is endemic to aris parts of western Australia.

== Description ==
The rounded or obconic shrub typically grows to a height of 2 to 3 metres (7 to 10 ft). The plant often has contorted trunks and main branches with grey coloured bark that is often fissured on the main trunks. The sparsely haired branchlets become glabrous with age. Like many species of Acacia it has phyllodes rather than true leaves. The evergreen, erect and terete phyllodes have a length of 6 to 9.5 cm (2.4 to 3.7 in) and a diameter of 0.9 to 1 mm (0.035 to 0.039 in). The phyllodes are densely haired when immature that soon become glabrescent or hairs persisting in grooves between the many thin parallel nerves. It blooms from July to August and produces yellow flowers and yellow fruit.

== Distribution ==
It is native to a small area in the Mid West and Goldfields regions of Western Australia where it is usually situated along drainage lines, on plains and on rocky hills. It has a limited range to the south west of Meekatharra from around Belele Station that extends about 120 km (75 mi) to around Neds Creek Station in the north east and 120 km (75 mi) to the south east of Meekatharra.

== See also ==
- List of Acacia species
