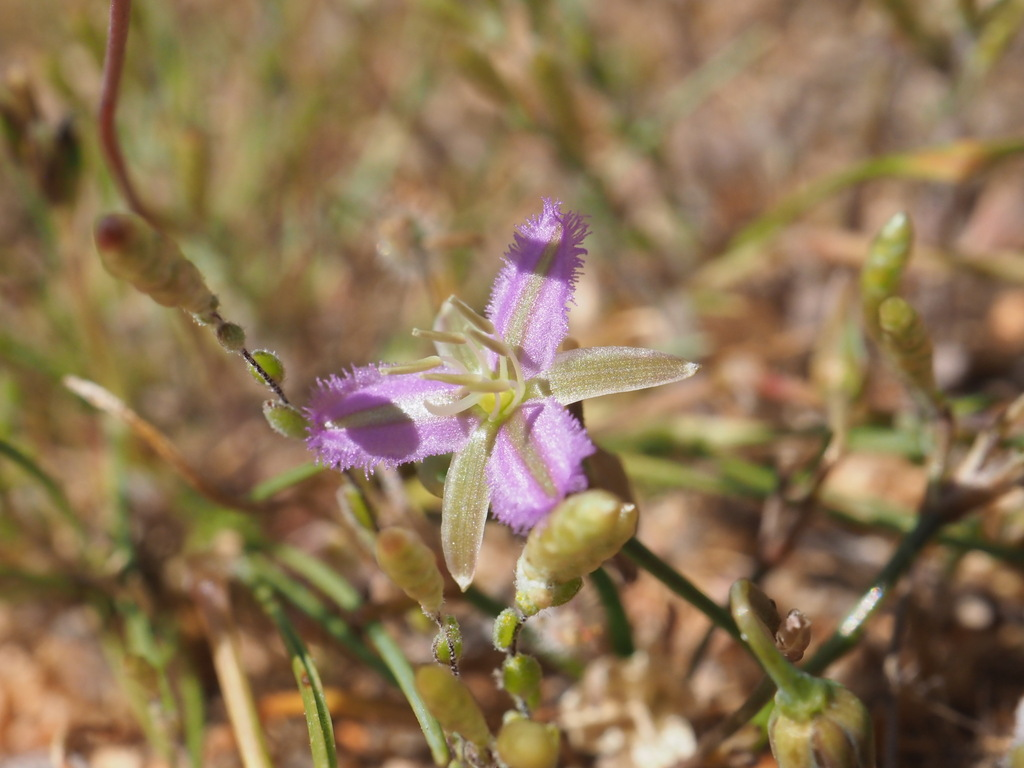

Scientific classification
- Kingdom: Plantae
- Clade: Tracheophytes
- Clade: Angiosperms
- Clade: Monocots
- Order: Asparagales
- Family: Asparagaceae
- Subfamily: Lomandroideae
- Genus: Thysanotus
- Species: T. speckii

Binomial name
- Thysanotus speckii N.H.Brittan

= Thysanotus speckii =

Species of plant

Thysanotus speckii is a species of flowering plant in the Asparagaceae family, and is endemic to the south-west of Western Australia. It is a perennial herb with a small rootstock, tuberous roots, a few linear leaves and umbels of four to six purple flowers with linear to narrowly lance-shaped sepals, oblong, fringed petals and six stamens of differing lengths.

== Description ==
Thysanotus speckii is a perennial herb with a small rootstock and tuberous roots, the tubers sessile and 25–35 mm (0.98–1.38 in) long. It has a few more or less linear, flat leaves, 125–250 mm (4.9–9.8 in) long, and that sometimes wither before flowering. The flowers are borne in loose panicles about 100–150 mm (3.9–5.9 in) long with umbels of up to four to six flowers, each on a pedicel 5–12 mm (0.20–0.47 in) long. The perianth segments are 5–12 mm (0.20–0.47 in) long, the sepals curved, linear to narrowly lance-shaped, about 2.5 mm (0.098 in) wide, and the petals oblong, 3.5–4 mm (0.14–0.16 in) wide, with a fringe 1.5–2 mm (0.059–0.079 in) long. There are six stamens, the three outer anthers 4 mm (0.16 in) long and the inner anthers 5 mm (0.20 in) long. The style is curved 4–5 mm (0.16–0.20 in) long. Flowering occurs from July to September, and the seeds are elliptical, about 2 mm (0.079 in) long and 1.5 mm (0.059 in) in diameter, with a straw-coloured aril.

== Taxonomy ==
Thysanotus speckii was first formally described in 1972 by Norman Henry Brittan in the Journal of the Royal Society of Western Australia from specimens collected by Nathaniel Henry Speck, 20 mi (32 km) north-west of Belele Station and about 30 mi (48 km) west-north-west of Meekatharra in 1957. The specific epithet (speckii) honours the collector of the type specimens.

== Distribution and habitat ==
This species of Thysanotus grows in shrubland with scattered mulga (Acacia aneura) on red sand, granite outcrops and red sandy loam between Exmouth and Geraldton, including some off-shore islands, and south-east towards Meekatharra and the Bullfinch area, in the Avon Wheatbelt, Carnarvon, Coolgardie, Gascoyne, Geraldton Sandplains, Murchison and Yalgoo bioregions of south-western Western Australia.

== Conservation status ==
Thysanotus speckii is listed as "not threatened" by the Western Australian Government Department of Biodiversity, Conservation and Attractions.
