= Porlell, Western Australia =

Ghost town in Western Australia

Porlell
- Town
- Interactive map of Porlell
- Coordinates: 26.933°S 118.60°E
- Country: Australia
- State: Western Australia
- LGA: Shire of Meekatharra
- Location: 725 km (450 mi) NNE of Perth; 23 km (14 mi) SEast of Nannine
- Established: 1899

Government
  - State electorate: North West
  - Federal division: Durack
- Elevation: 463 m (1,519 ft)

Porlell is a ghost town located in the Mid West region of Western Australia. It is found between the towns of Nannine and Gabanintha. The town is situated within the Murchison goldfields.

Gold was discovered in the immediate area in the mid-1890s by Leslie Robert Menzies at a find known as The Star of the East. The townsite was gazetted in 1899 after significant development had been established. Star of the East was not considered to be a suitable name so the town took the name of a nearby lake, Porlelle Lake, which had been named when the area was surveyed in 1886. The spelling was amended for unknown reasons and the meaning of the name is unknown.

The town supported Jules Gascards coachline a weekly coach service that ran every Sunday to Nannine which was known to run from 1896. A postal service was established in 1896 as were two hotels; The Gabanintha Hotel and the Yagahong Hotel.
