= Gabanintha, Western Australia =

Ghost Town in Western Australia

Gabanintha
- Town
- Interactive map of Gabanintha
- Coordinates: 26°55′S 118°39′E
- Country: Australia
- State: Western Australia
- LGA: Shire of Meekatharra
- Location: 832 km (517 mi) NNE of Perth; 40 km (25 mi) SE of Meekatharra
- Established: 1898

Government
  - State electorate: North West
  - Federal division: Durack

Gabanintha is a ghost town located in the Mid West region of Western Australia approximately 40 km south east of Meekatharra on the Meekatharra-Sandstone road. The town is situated within the Murchison goldfields.

The name of the town is Aboriginal in origin but of unknown meaning. The name of the town can be found on maps dating as far back as 1894, with gold mining leases being taken out in the surrounding areas in 1895 to 1910.

In 1895, an abandoned lease known as The Emerald Isle Star of the East was taken up by a syndicate and renamed Gabanintha. While driving on the old workings 3 ft of reef was exposed showing good gold.

A shopkeeper from Nannine, William Small, built a hotel in the town and applied for a licence in 1896. The state government was petitioned in 1897 by the miners of the area to survey the townsite which had land reserved the following year resulting in the town being gazetted in 1898.

The population of the town was 46 (44 males and 2 females) in 1898.

Lots were surveyed in 1905 and mining continued around the town until 1944.

The townsite is one of many ghost towns in the area; others include: Peak Hill, Horseshoe and Garden Gully.
