= Swainsona paradoxa =

Scientific classification
- Kingdom: Plantae
- Clade: Tracheophytes
- Clade: Angiosperms
- Clade: Eudicots
- Clade: Rosids
- Order: Fabales
- Family: Fabaceae
- Subfamily: Faboideae
- Genus: Swainsona
- Species: S. paradoxa

Binomial name
- Swainsona paradoxa W.Fitzg.

Species of plant

Swainsona paradoxa is a species of flowering plant in the family Fabaceae and is endemic to inland Western Australia. It is a prostrate or ascending perennial or annual herb with imparipinnate leaves with up to 9 mostly broadly egg-shaped leaflets and racemes of 2 to 20 purple, pink or white flowers.

== Description ==
Swainsona paradoxa is a prostrate or ascending perennial or annual plant, that rarely grows to a height of 20 cm (7.9 in) and has many stems. The leaves are imparipinnate, mostly 10–120 mm (0.39–4.72 in) long with up to 9 broadly egg-shaped leaflets with the narrower end towards the base, the side leaflets up to 25 mm (0.98 in) long and 15 mm (0.59 in) wide with stipules mostly 2–7 mm (0.079–0.276 in) long at the base of the petioles. The flowers are purple, pink or white, arranged in racemes of 2 to 20, 50–250 mm (2.0–9.8 in) long, on a peduncle 0.5–3 mm (0.020–0.118 in) wide. The sepals are joined at the base to form a tube about 1.5 mm (0.059 in) long, with lobes shorter than the tube. The standard petal is 8–10 mm (0.31–0.39 in) long and up to about 12 mm (0.47 in) wide, the wings 7–8 mm (0.28–0.31 in) long and the keel about 7–8 mm (0.28–0.31 in) long and 3–4 mm (0.12–0.16 in) deep. Flowering occurs in April or May, or from July to September, and the fruit is a pod 10–15 mm (0.39–0.59 in) long on a stalk about 1 mm (0.039 in) long, with the remains of the strongly curved style 3–4 mm (0.12–0.16 in) long.

== Taxonomy and naming ==
Swainsona paradoxa was first formally described in 1904 by William Vincent Fitzgerald and the description was published in the Journal of the West Australian Natural History Society from specimens he found near the margins of a salt lake near Nannine. The specific epithet (paradoxa) means "unexpected" or "strange", referring to the fruit.

== Distribution and habitat ==
This species of pea grows on the edges of salt lakes or salt flats in the Coolgardie, Gascoyne and Murchison bioregions of inland Western Australia.
