= Acacia microcalyx =

Scientific classification
- Kingdom: Plantae
- Clade: Tracheophytes
- Clade: Angiosperms
- Clade: Eudicots
- Clade: Rosids
- Order: Fabales
- Family: Fabaceae
- Subfamily: Caesalpinioideae
- Clade: Mimosoid clade
- Genus: Acacia
- Species: A. microcalyx

Binomial name
- Acacia microcalyx Maslin
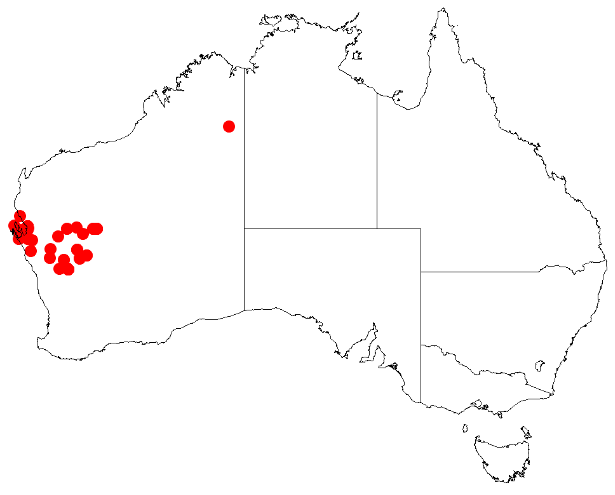
- Occurrence data from AVH

Synonyms
- Racosperma microcalyx (Maslin) Pedley

Species of legume

Acacia microcalyx is a species of flowering plant in the family Fabaceae, and is endemic to Western Australia. It is a more or less rounded shrub with many branches, rigid, somewhat spiny branchlets, only a few linear phyllodes, spherical heads of cream-coloured flowers, and thinly leathery pods rounded over the seeds and constricted between them.

== Description ==
Acacia microcalyx is a dense, more or less rounded shrub with many stems, that typically grows to a height of 1.5–3 m (4 ft 11 in – 9 ft 10 in) and has rigid, ascending to erect, straight and sparingly divided, somewhat spiny branchlets. Its phyllodes are few and well-spaced, linear, 20–40 mm (0.79–1.57 in) long and 1–2 mm (0.039–0.079 in) wide, slightly sharply pointed with an obscure midrib. The flowers are borne in up to four spherical heads in racemes 2–15 mm (0.079–0.591 in) long on a peduncle 7–15 mm (0.28–0.59 in) long, each head with 14 to 16 cream-coloured flowers. Flowering occurs from February to June and the pods are up to 200 mm (7.9 in) long, 10 mm (0.39 in) wide, thinly leathery, brown and rounded over and constricted between the seeds. The seeds are more or less spherical to broadly oblong, 8–9 mm (0.31–0.35 in) long, shiny dark brown with an aril.

== Taxonomy ==
Acacia microcalyx was first formally described in 1974 by Bruce Maslin in the journal Nuytsia from specimens collected by Alex George, 28 mi (45 km) west of the Overlander Roadhouse on the Shark Bay road in 1962. The specific epithet (microcalyx) means 'small calyx', referring to the reduced sepals that are less than one quarter the length of the petals.

== Distribution and habitat ==
This species of wattle grows on plains and floodplains in sand to clay soils with species of Atriplex or Halosarcia, mostly commonly around Shark Bay but extending inland to Mount Magnet, near Payne's Find and Belele Station in the Carnarvon, Geraldton Sandplains, Murchison and Yalgoo bioregions of inland Western Australia.

== See also ==
- List of Acacia species
