= Leioproctus calcaratus =

Scientific classification
- Kingdom: Animalia
- Phylum: Arthropoda
- Clade: Pancrustacea
- Class: Insecta
- Order: Hymenoptera
- Family: Colletidae
- Genus: Leioproctus
- Species: L. calcaratus

Binomial name
- Leioproctus calcaratus Michener, 1965

Species of bee

Leioproctus calcaratus, or Leioproctus (Baeocolletes) calcaratus, is a species of bee in the family Colletidae and subfamily Colletinae. It is endemic to Australia. It was described by American entomologist Charles Duncan Michener in 1965.

== Etymology ==
The specific epithet calcaratus is an anatomical reference to the thick, curved, hind tibial spurs.

== Description ==
Female body length 6.5 mm, forewing length 4.3 mm. Integumental colouration mainly black, hair white and brown.

== Distribution and habitat ==
The species occurs in Western Australia. The type locality is Belele Station.

== Behaviour ==
The adults are flying mellivores.
