= Leioproctus nomiaeformis =

Scientific classification
- Kingdom: Animalia
- Phylum: Arthropoda
- Clade: Pancrustacea
- Class: Insecta
- Order: Hymenoptera
- Family: Colletidae
- Genus: Leioproctus
- Species: L. nomiaeformis

Binomial name
- Leioproctus nomiaeformis (Cockerell, 1930)

Synonyms
- Paracolletes nomiaeformis Cockerell, 1930

Species of bee

Leioproctus nomiaeformis, or Leioproctus (Odontocolletes) nomiaeformis, is a species of bee in the family Colletidae and subfamily Colletinae. It is endemic to Australia. It was described by British-American entomologist Theodore Dru Alison Cockerell in 1930.

== Description ==
Male body length is about 8 mm. Integumental colouration is mainly black; the abdomen is brownish; the hair is white and pale greyish-yellow.

== Distribution and habitat ==
The species occurs in both eastern and western Australia. The type locality is Charleville, Queensland. It has also been recorded from Belele Station in Western Australia.

== Behaviour ==
The adults are flying mellivores.
