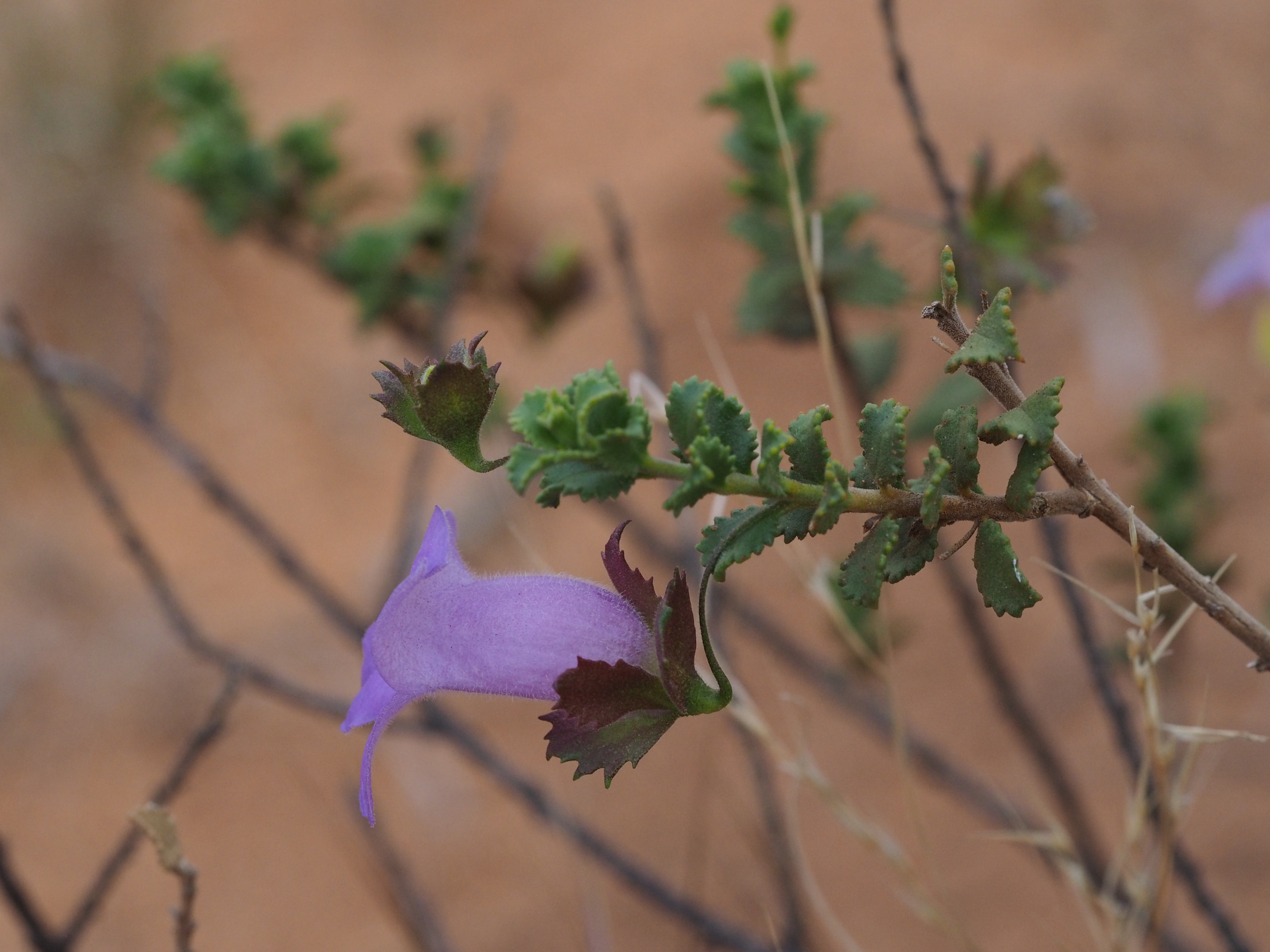
- Eremophila flabellata leaves and flowers

Scientific classification
- Kingdom: Plantae
- Clade: Embryophytes
- Clade: Tracheophytes
- Clade: Spermatophytes
- Clade: Angiosperms
- Clade: Eudicots
- Clade: Asterids
- Order: Lamiales
- Family: Scrophulariaceae
- Genus: Eremophila
- Species: E. flabellata

Binomial name
- Eremophila flabellata Chinnock

= Eremophila flabellata =

Species of flowering plant

Eremophila flabellata is a flowering plant in the figwort family, Scrophulariaceae and is endemic to Western Australia. It is a small shrub with serrated leaves, broad serrated sepals and pink, purple or mauve flowers.

== Description ==
Eremophila flabellata is a shrub, usually growing to less than 0.5 m (2 ft) tall with branches and leaves which are sticky and shiny due to resin and densely covered with simple hairs. The leaves are arranged alternately, mostly 8–12 mm (0.3–0.5 in) long, 5.5–8.5 mm (0.2–0.3 in) wide, egg-shaped to almost circular and with serrated edges.

The flowers are borne singly on a hairy stalk which is 20–40 mm (0.8–2 in) long. There are 5 overlapping hairy, green to purple sepals which are mostly 8–11.5 mm (0.3–0.5 in) long, egg-shaped to fan-shaped with distinctly serrated edges. The petals are 15–25 mm (0.6–1 in) long and joined at their lower end to form a tube. The petals are pink to mauve or purple on the outside and white inside the tube. The outer surface of the petal tube is hairy, but the inner surface of the petal lobes is glabrous while the inside of the tube is full of woolly hairs. The 4 stamens are fully enclosed in the petal tube. Flowering occurs from May to September and is followed by fruits which are dry, woody and hairy, a narrow oval shape to almost spherical, have a papery covering and are 7–8.5 mm (0.28–0.33 in) long.

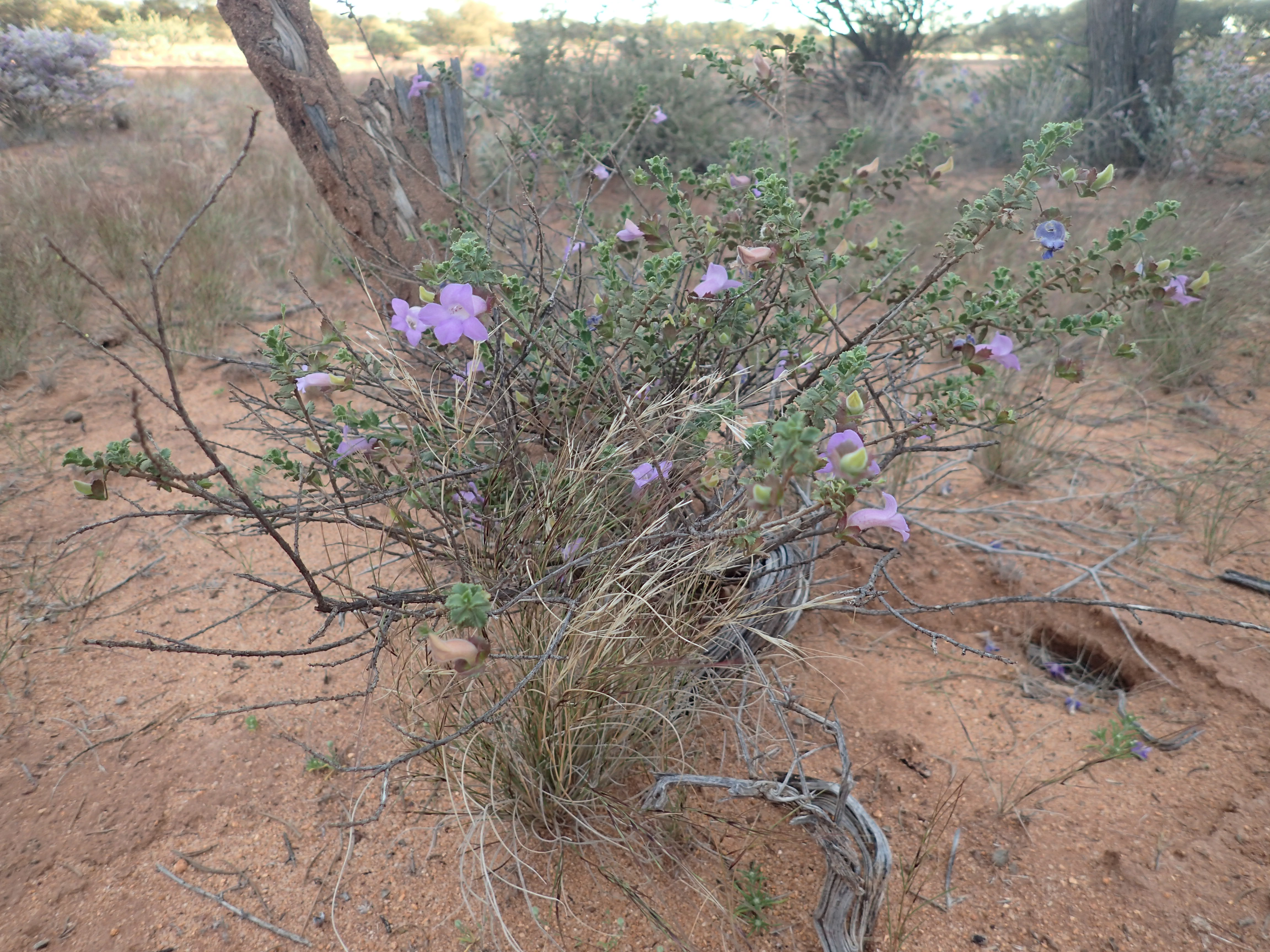
E. flabellata growing near Meekatharra

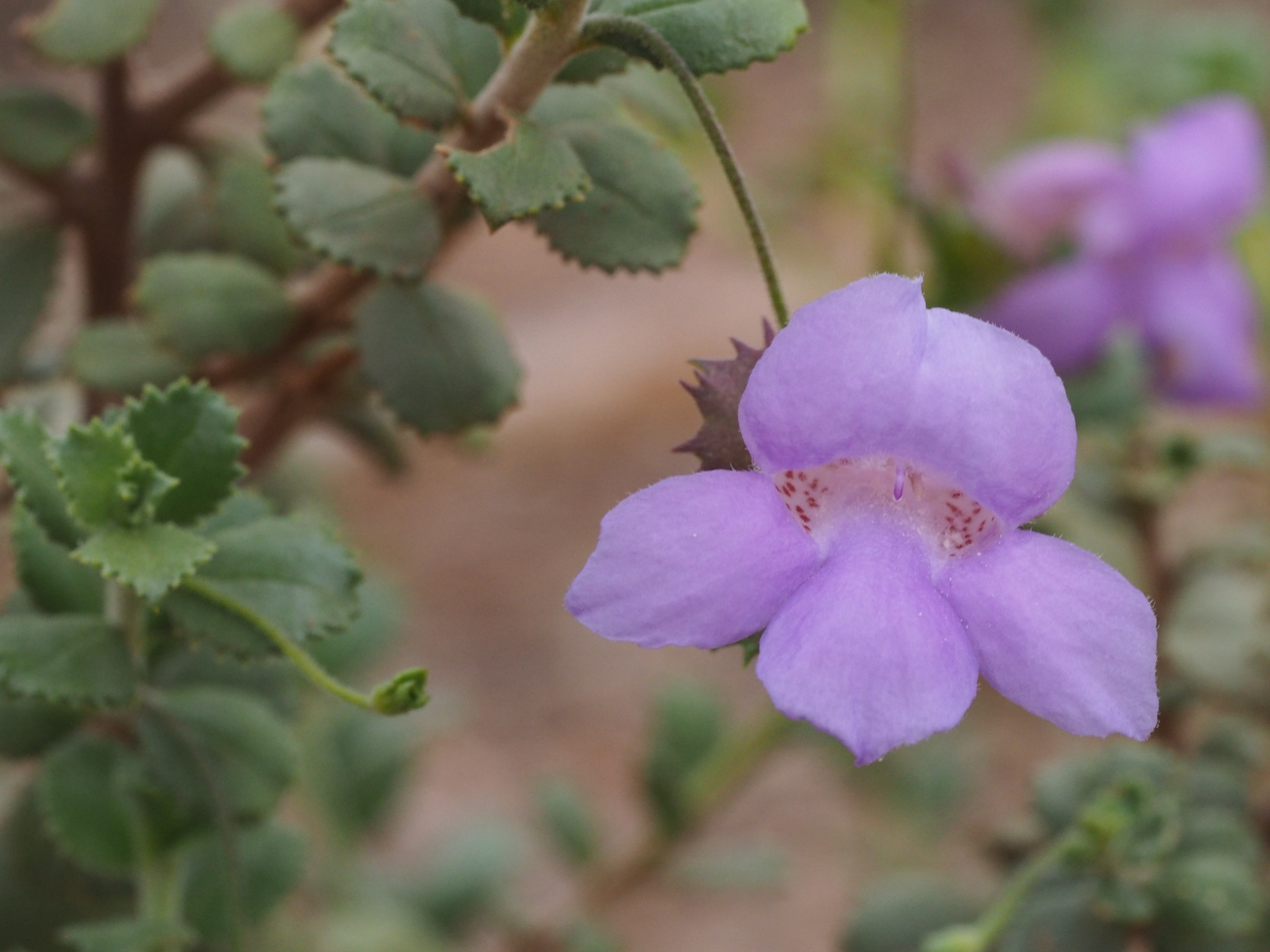
E. flabellata floral tube

== Taxonomy and naming ==
Eremophila flabellata was first formally described by Robert Chinnock in 2007 and the description was published in Eremophila and Allied Genera: A Monograph of the Plant Family Myoporaceae. The type specimen was collected by Chinnock in 1986, about 15 km (9 mi) south-west of Wiluna. The specific epithet is from the Latin flabellata, 'fan-shaped', referring to the shape of the sepals of this species.

== Distribution and habitat ==
This eremophila often occurs in mulga woodland, growing in red-brown clay loam in the Meekatharra and Wiluna districts of the Murchison biogeographic region.

== Conservation status ==
Eremophila flabellata is classified as "not threatened" by the Western Australian Government Department of Parks and Wildlife.

== Use in horticulture ==
This eremophila has not often been grown in gardens but has interesting, serrated leaves and colourful flowers. It is difficult to propagate from seed or from cuttings and is one of the few of its genus that will not graft onto Myoporum rootstock. It prefers well-drained soil in a sunny location and tolerates light frosts.
