= Swainsona elegantoides =

Scientific classification
- Kingdom: Plantae
- Clade: Tracheophytes
- Clade: Angiosperms
- Clade: Eudicots
- Clade: Rosids
- Order: Fabales
- Family: Fabaceae
- Subfamily: Faboideae
- Genus: Swainsona
- Species: S. elegantoides

Binomial name
- Swainsona elegantoides (A.T.Lee) Joy Thomps.

Species of legume

Swainsona elegantoides is a species of flowering plant in the family Fabaceae and is endemic to north-western Western Australia. It is an erect, probably annual plant with imparipinnate leaves, with about 11 narrowly egg-shaped leaflets, and racemes of 15 to 25 purple flowers.

== Description ==
Swainsona elegantoides is an erect, probably annual plant that typically grows to a height of more than 100 cm (39 in) with stems about 5 mm (0.20 in) in diameter. Its leaves are imparipinnate, 50–100 mm (2.0–3.9 in) long with about 11 narrowly egg-shaped leaflets, the lower leaflets 10–25 mm (0.39–0.98 in) long and 3–8 mm (0.12–0.31 in) wide. There are variably-shaped stipules up to 10 mm (0.39 in) long at the base of the petiole. The flowers are arranged in racemes mostly 15–30 mm (0.59–1.18 in) of 15 to 25 on a peduncle 1–2 mm (0.039–0.079 in) long, each flower 10–15 mm (0.39–0.59 in) long. The sepals are joined at the base, forming a tube about 2 mm (0.079 in) long, the sepal lobes about twice the length of the tube. The petals are purple, the standard petal 10–15 mm (0.39–0.59 in) long, the wings 7–11 mm (0.28–0.43 in) long, and the keel 8–12 mm (0.31–0.47 in) long and 3–4 mm (0.12–0.16 in) deep. Flowering occurs from July to October, and the fruit is a pod 10–20 mm (0.39–0.79 in) long and 5–7 mm (0.20–0.28 in) wide with the remains of the hooked style about 5 mm (0.20 in) long.

== Taxonomy and naming ==
This species was first formally described in 1948 by Alma Theodora Lee who gave it the name Swainsona beasleyana subsp. elegantoides in Contributions from the New South Wales National Herbarium, from specimens collected near Mount Hales near the upper Murchison River by W.A. Crossland in 1884. In 1993, Joy Thompson raised the subspecies to species status in the journal Telopea. The specific epithet (elegantoides) means "like Swainsona elegans".

== Distribution and habitat ==
This species of pea grows among rocks, on flats and on moist floodplains in the Gascoyne, Murchison, Pilbara and Yalgoo bioregions in the north-west of Western Australia.
