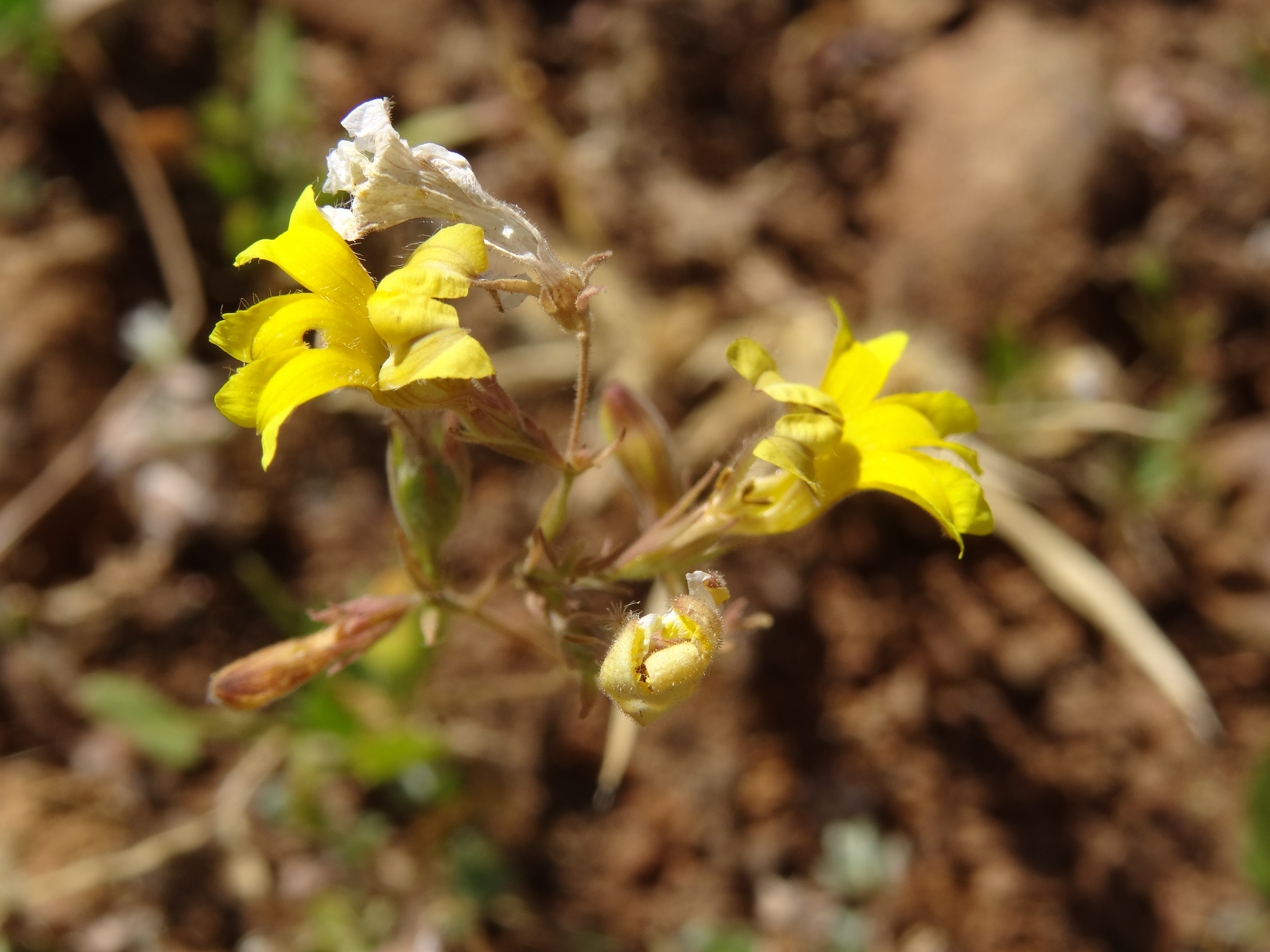

Conservation status
- Priority Four — Rare Taxa (DEC)

Scientific classification
- Kingdom: Plantae
- Clade: Tracheophytes
- Clade: Angiosperms
- Clade: Eudicots
- Clade: Asterids
- Order: Asterales
- Family: Goodeniaceae
- Genus: Goodenia
- Species: G. berringbinensis

Binomial name
- Goodenia berringbinensis Carolin

= Goodenia berringbinensis =

Species of plant

Goodenia berringbinensis is a species of flowering plant in the family Goodeniaceae and is endemic to Western Australia. It is an annual herb with lance-shaped leaves mostly at the base of the plant, and loose thyrses of yellow flowers.

== Description ==
Goodenia berringbinensis is an annual herb that typically grows to a height of 300 mm (12 in), with softly-hairy foliage. The leaves are mostly at the base of the plant, lance-shaped with the narrower end towards the base, 35–60 mm (1.4–2.4 in) long and 2–10 mm (0.079–0.394 in) wide, sometimes with small teeth on the edges. The flowers are arranged in loose thyrses up to 150 mm (5.9 in) long on a peduncle 5–30 mm (0.20–1.18 in) long, each flower on a pedicel 13–20 mm (0.51–0.79 in) long with a linear to elliptic bracts 4–15 mm (0.16–0.59 in) long at the base. The sepals are lance-shaped, about 3 mm (0.12 in) long, the corolla yellow, about 12 mm (0.47 in) long. The lower lobes of the corolla are 4–5 mm (0.16–0.20 in) long with wings about 2 mm (0.079 in) wide. Flowering has been observed in October and the fruit is a more or less cylindrical capsule about 8 mm (0.31 in) long.

== Taxonomy and naming ==
Goodenia berringbinensis was first formally described in 1990 by Roger Charles Carolin in the journal Telopea from material collected by Charles Gardner in the bed of Berringbine Creek on Belele Station in 1945. The specific epithet (berringbinensis) refers to the type location.

== Distribution and habitat ==
This goodenia grows along watercourses in scattered locations in the Coolgardie, Gascoyne, Murchison, Pilbara and Yalgoo biogeographic regions of Western Australia.

== Conservation status ==
Goodenia berringbinensis is classified as "Priority Four" by the Government of Western Australia Department of Parks and Wildlife, meaning that it is rare or near threatened.
