= Leioproctus asper =

Scientific classification
- Kingdom: Animalia
- Phylum: Arthropoda
- Clade: Pancrustacea
- Class: Insecta
- Order: Hymenoptera
- Family: Colletidae
- Genus: Leioproctus
- Species: L. asper

Binomial name
- Leioproctus asper Maynard 1997

Species of bee

Leioproctus asper, or Leioproctus (Odontocolletes) asper, is a species of bee in the family Colletidae and subfamily Colletinae. It is endemic to Australia. It was described by Australian entomologist Glynn Maynard in 1997.

== Etymology ==
The specific epithet asper (Latin: "rough") is an anatomical reference to the strongly punctate tegulae.

== Description ==
Female body length is 11 mm, male body length 9 mm. Integumental colouration is dark brown to black.

== Distribution and habitat ==
The species occurs in Western Australia. The type locality is 8.4 km east of Meekatharra, in the Mid West region.

== Behaviour ==
The adults are flying mellivores. Flowering plants visited by the bees include Eremophila species.
