= Nannine Road District =

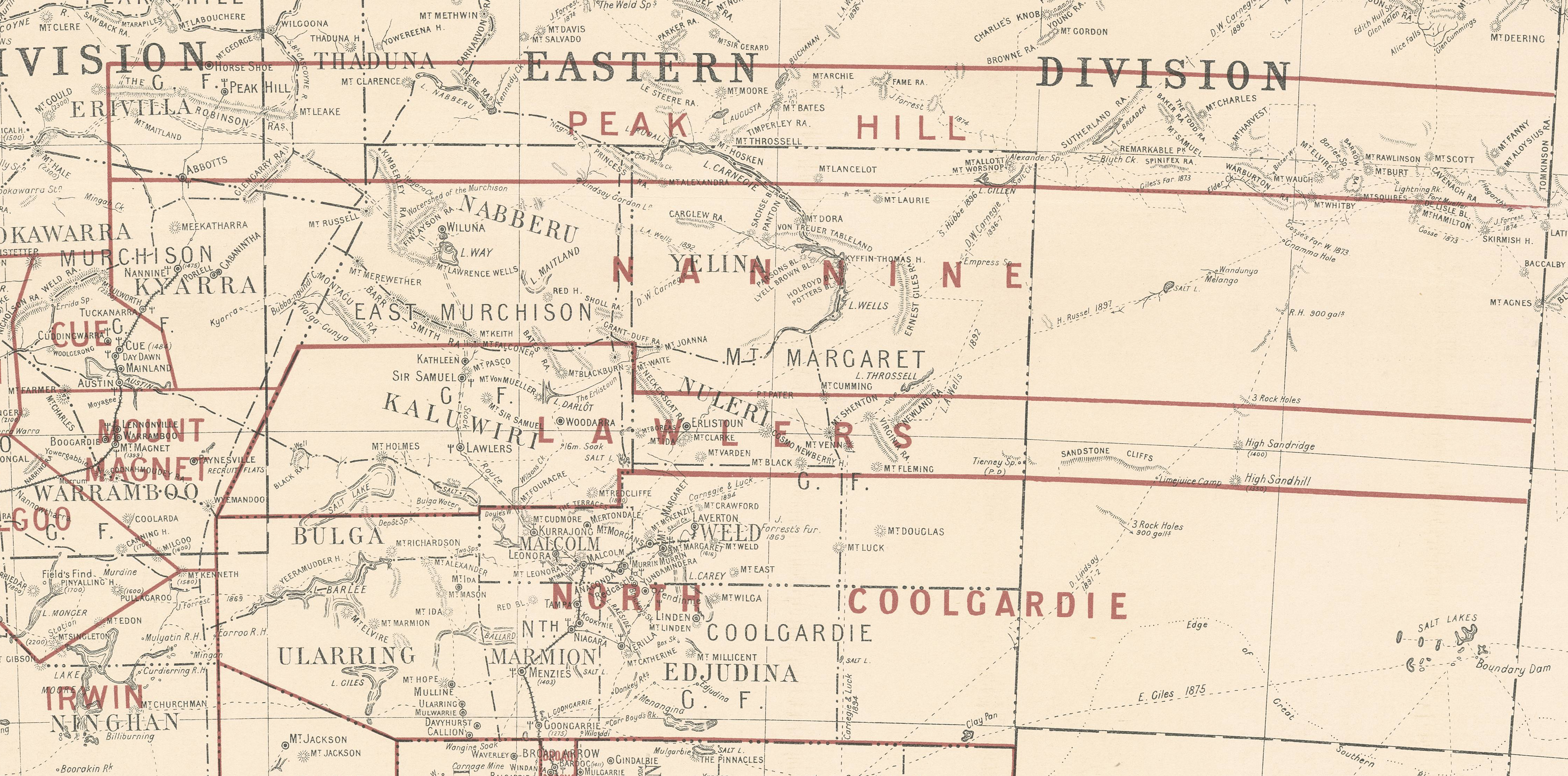
Map of Nannine and adjacent road districts, 1905

The Nannine Road District was an early form of local government area on the Western Australian goldfields of the Mid West region.

It was established on 13 October 1893, providing basic local government to the goldfields in and around the town of Nannine. The first election was held on 5 March 1894. The board election was controversial as it was held at Cue and was reportedly poorly advertised in Nannine itself; as a consequence, no members from the Nannine township were elected and a meeting was held in Nannine protesting the process and outcome as a "gross injustice".

The Municipality of Nannine, covering the Nannine townsite itself, separated from the road district on 22 July 1896.

The road district was abolished on 29 October 1909, along with the Peak Hill Road District, with the Meekatharra Road District and Wiluna Road District being formed out of their former territory. The Nannine board had been the subject of criticism from residents of Wiluna, who argued that they were seeing inadequate expenditure for the rates they were paying out.

The Nannine Road District was re-established on 2 April 1913, when the Municipality of Nannine was merged into a reconstituted, smaller road district largely separated from the Meekatharra Road District. The board's re-creation was strongly opposed by the Meekatharra board, who lobbied hard against the change. The re-established road board took over the council chambers formerly occupied by the municipality. The road district was abolished for a second and final time on 24 January 1930 and divided between the Cue Road District and Meekatharra Road District. The board's final meeting was held on 14 January 1930.

In 1950, a one-room timber and iron structure in Nannine township that had formerly served as the board's office was sold off by the Meekatharra Road Board.
