= Municipality of Nannine =

Former local government area in Western Australia

The Municipality of Nannine was a local government area in Western Australia, centred on the mining town of Nannine.

== History ==
It was established on 22 July 1896, separating the townsite from the surrounding Nannine Road District, following a petition from the Nannine Progress Committee. The first election was held on 23 September 1896, with J. H. F. Masterson becoming the inaugural chairman of the council. The council initially met in the Nannine Courthouse; an office for the town clerk in the town's Miners' Institute building was acquired in late 1897. A standalone council chambers on the corner of Marmion and Simpson streets was built c. 1900, along with a public pound.

It ceased to exist on 2 April 1913, when it merged into a revived Nannine Road District (the original road district having been abolished in 1909).
