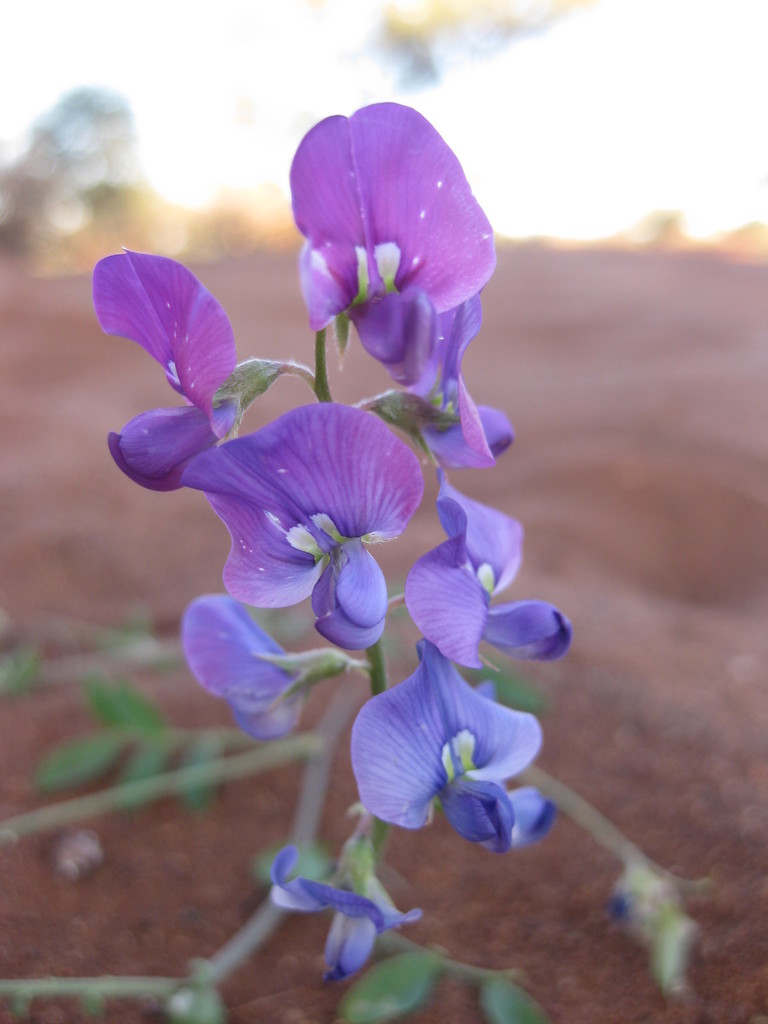
- Near Peak Hill

Scientific classification
- Kingdom: Plantae
- Clade: Tracheophytes
- Clade: Angiosperms
- Clade: Eudicots
- Clade: Rosids
- Order: Fabales
- Family: Fabaceae
- Subfamily: Faboideae
- Genus: Swainsona
- Species: S. elegans

Binomial name
- Swainsona elegans A.T.Lee

= Swainsona elegans =

Species of legume

Swainsona elegans is a species of flowering plant in the family Fabaceae and is endemic to Western Australia. It is a prostrate or ascending annual with imparipinnate leaves, usually with 7 to 15 egg-shaped or elliptic leaflets, and racemes of up to 15 blue or reddish-purple flowers.

== Description ==
Swainsona elegans is a prostrate or ascending annual plant that typically grows to a height of up to 25 cm (9.8 in) with stems about 2 mm (0.079 in) in diameter. Its leaves are imparipinnate, up to about 100 mm (3.9 in) long with 7 to 15 egg-shaped or elliptic leaflets with the narrower end towards the base, the lower leaflets 10–20 mm (0.39–0.79 in) long and 2–5 mm (0.079–0.197 in) wide. There are variably-shaped stipules more than 10 mm (0.39 in) long at the base of the petiole. The flowers are arranged in racemes mostly 100–200 mm (3.9–7.9 in) of up to 15 on a peduncle 1–2 mm (0.039–0.079 in) long, each flower 8–10 mm (0.31–0.39 in) long. The sepals are joined at the base, forming a tube about 2 mm (0.079 in) long, the sepal lobes about the same length as the tube. The petals are pale blue, dark blue or reddish-purple, the standard petal 10–13 mm (0.39–0.51 in) long and 9–12 mm (0.35–0.47 in) wide, the wings 8–9 mm (0.31–0.35 in) long, and the keel about 10 mm (0.39 in) long and 3 mm (0.12 in) wide. Flowering occurs from July to October, and the fruit is a pod 15–20 mm (0.59–0.79 in) long and 4–6 mm (0.16–0.24 in) wide with the remains of the style about 5 mm (0.20 in) long.

== Taxonomy and naming ==
Swainsona elegans was first formally described in 1948 by Alma Theodora Lee in Contributions from the New South Wales National Herbarium, from specimens collected east of Carnarvon in 1937. The specific epithet (elegans) means "fine" or "elegant".

== Distribution and habitat ==
This species of pea grows in damp, often salty and on stony, hilly places in the Avon Wheatbelt, Carnarvon, Gascoyne, Murchison and Yalgoo bioregions of Western Australia.
