= John Connelly (prospector) =

Australian prospector

John Francis Connelly (1860–1928) was an Australian prospector and mine owner. Born in Victoria, he prospected and owned mines in New South Wales.

He discovered a platinum field at Fifield before joining the gold rush to Cossack, Western Australia in 1889.

He discovered the Nannine gold field the following year, and was rewarded by the Government of Western Australia with £500.

Later, he prospected in New Guinea and New Zealand. He died in 1928, and is buried in Karrakatta Cemetery in Perth, Western Australia.

Connelly was also an active collector of Australian Aboriginal artefacts. Collections associated with him are held in the Field Museum, Chicago, the Bishop Museum in Hawaii and the National Museum of Australia in Canberra. His papers are held in the State Library of New South Wales.
