= Karalundi Community =

Community in Western Australia

Karalundi
- Town
- Coordinates: 26.1276°0′S 118.68376°0′E
- Country: Australia
- State: Western Australia
- LGA(s): Shire of Meekatharra
- Location: 60 km (37 mi) north of Meekatharra
- Established: 2012

Government
  - State electorate(s): North West
  - Federal division(s): Durack

Area
  - Total: 234.3 km^{2} (90.5 sq mi)

Population
  - Total(s): 65 (SAL 2021)
- Postcode: 6642
- Mean max temp: 28.8 °C (83.8 °F)
- Mean min temp: 15.8 °C (60.4 °F)
- Annual rainfall: 236.9 mm (9.33 in)

Karalundi is a medium-sized Aboriginal community, located 60 km north of Meekatharra in the Mid West region of Western Australia, within the Shire of Meekatharra.

== Native title ==
The community is located within the registered Wajarri Yamatji (WAD6033/98) native title claim area.

== Education ==
Children of school age at Karalundi attend the Karalundi Aboriginal Education Community campus. It is a co-educational school catering for students K – 10. All students at the school are boarders. Students are resident only during the school term and return to their communities for holiday periods.

== Town planning ==
Karalundi Layout Plan No.1 has been prepared in accordance with State Planning Policy 3.2 Aboriginal Settlements. Layout Plan No.1 was endorsed by the community on 19 February 2007 and the Western Australian Planning Commission on 13 November 2007.
