= Shire of Meekatharra =

Coordinates: 26°35′35″S 118°29′28″E

- Local government area
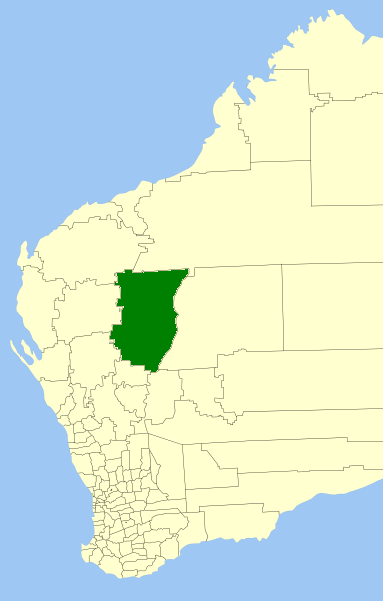
- Location in Western Australia

- Interactive map of Shire of Meekatharra
- Country: Australia
- State: Western Australia
- Region: Mid West
- Council seat: Meekatharra

Government
  - Shire President: Harvey Nichols
  - State electorate: Mid-West
  - Federal division: Durack

Area
  - Total: 100,789 km^{2} (38,915 sq mi)

Population
  - Total: 1,200 (LGA 2021)
- Website: Shire of Meekatharra
LGAs around Shire of Meekatharra
Ashburton	East Pilbara	East Pilbara
Upper Gascoyne	Shire of Meekatharra	Wiluna
Murchison	Cue	Sandstone

The Shire of Meekatharra is a local government area in the Mid West region of Western Australia, about halfway between the town of Port Hedland and the state capital, Perth, Western Australia. The Shire covers an area of 100,789 square kilometres (38,915 sq mi), and its seat of government is the town of Meekatharra.

== History ==
The Meekatharra Road District was established on 31 October 1909 out of the abolished Peak Hill Road District and Nannine Road District. It lost much of its territory to a reconstituted Nannine Road District on 7 December 1913, but regained much of that when the Nannine district was abolished for a second and final time on 24 January 1930. It became a shire on 1 July 1961 following the passage of the Local Government Act 1960, which reformed all remaining road districts into shires.

== Wards ==
The shire is divided into three wards:

- Town Ward (five councillors)
- Nannine Ward (two councillors)
- Peak Hill Ward (two councillors)

== Towns and localities ==
The towns and localities of the Shire of Meekatharra with population and size figures based on the most recent Australian census:

Locality	Population	Area	Map
Angelo River	3 (SAL 2021)	13,971.6 km^{2} (5,394.5 sq mi)	
Capricorn	79 (SAL 2021)	16,772.3 km^{2} (6,475.8 sq mi)	
Karalundi Community	65 (SAL 2021)	234.3 km^{2} (90.5 sq mi)	
Kumarina	91 (SAL 2021)	16,361.5 km^{2} (6,317.2 sq mi)	
Meekatharra	849 (SAL 2021)	26,588.7 km^{2} (10,266.0 sq mi)	
Peak Hill	121 (SAL 2021)	26,524.1 km^{2} (10,241.0 sq mi)	

== Ghost towns ==
Ghost towns in the Shire of Meekatharra:

- Gabanintha
- Horseshoe
- Nannine
- Peak Hill
- Porlell

== Heritage-listed places ==
As of 2023, 102 places are heritage-listed in the Shire of Meekatharra, of which three are on the State Register of Heritage Places.
