= Belele Station =

Pastoral lease in Western Australia

Coordinates: 26.36047°S 118.03148°E

Location in Western Australia

Belele Station is a pastoral lease in Western Australia that operates as a cattle station and as a sheep station for the production of wool.

== Description ==
The station is located in the Murchison region of Western Australia; the nearest town is Meekatharra, approximately 53 kilometres (33 mi) to the south east. Occupying an area of 2,797 square kilometres (1,080 sq mi) the property contains 114 square kilometres (44 sq mi) of nature reserves and vacant crown land. The soil has a low level of erosion with 95% of the land being described as nil or minor. The perennial vegetation condition is described as fair with 40% of vegetation cover being described as poor or very poor. It is estimated that the property is able to carry 16,500 sheep in summer conditions.

== History ==
The station was initially established by Frank Wittenoom in the early 1880s after he had established both Nookawarra and Mileura stations further west of Belele. Wittenoom sold the property to Ernest Augustus Lee Steere and his partners in 1888, after Lee Steere had been working in the Murchison on various stations during the 1880s. The area was largely undeveloped at the time and over the course of several years he was able to bring it to full production. Belele occupied an area of 250,000 acres (101,171 ha) at this stage, stocked with both cattle and sheep. The area was struck by drought shortly afterwards so Lee Steere invested in mail transport between Nannine and Peak Hill, in a butchers, and in the Nannine general store to provide an income.

Seven Aboriginal men were arrested and charged with murder and cannibalism at Belele in 1895. The victim was another Aborigine, named Callynognoo, who came from the north west. The men, and the skull of the victim, were taken to Perth for trial after two of the group had decided to turn Queen's evidence.

The area was flooded in 1900 when over 9 inches (230 mm) of rain fell over two weeks, causing the Murchison River to rise causing a flood described as "probably the heaviest seen by whites".

Lee Steere, as the sole owner, expanded the Belele Pastoral Company to a size of 900,000 acres (364,217 ha), and also acquired nearby Annean Station.

The area experienced dry conditions for some time prior to 1913 when better conditions prevailed and the property was described as "the feed was very high, but the owner was suffering from the general complaint along the Murchison – too much feed for the stock to eat, the previous bad seasons having reduced numbers considerably".

In about 1917, bush poet Alf "The Axeman" Wallace wrote a poem "The Soldier from Belele" about a friend of his from Belele.

In 1923 the station book keeper, John Kennedy, drowned at the No. 3 well on the property. The property was isolated in flood waters in 1926 resulting in the loss of over 500 sheep.

The area was struck by drought in 1949, with very little rainfall recorded for 18 months. In 1950, sheep from Belele were sent to other family properties near Toodyay for agistment.

An elderly Irishman, Richard Butler Dobbyn, who lived on the station in a shack some distance from the homestead, went missing on the property in 1951. A search was conducted for about two weeks, including the use of a Royal Flying Doctor Service plane, but was unable to find the man. Dobbyn had come to the property in the 1880s and was given a block of land by the Lee Steeres when he asked to remain after he stopped working for the family in the 1940s.

== See also ==
- List of ranches and stations
- List of pastoral leases in Western Australia
