= Nannine, Western Australia =

Ghost town in Western Australia

Nannine
- Town
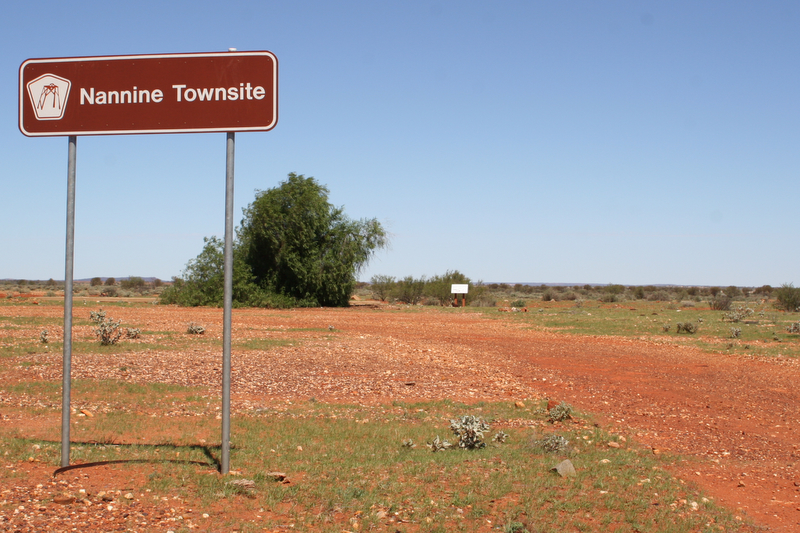
- Nannine Townsite 2008

- Interactive map of Nannine
- Coordinates: 26.885°S 118.341°E
- Country: Australia
- State: Western Australia
- LGA: Shire of Meekatharra
- Location: 735 km (457 mi) NNE of Perth; 30 km (19 mi) SSSW of Meekatharra
- Established: 1893

Government
  - State electorate: North West
  - Federal division: Durack
- Elevation: 452 m (1,483 ft)
- Postcode: 6642

Nannine is a ghost town in the Mid West region of Western Australia. It is located on the northern bank of Lake Anneen, approximately 35 kilometres (22 mi) south-southwest of Meekatharra, and 735 kilometres (457 mi) north-northeast of Perth.

Nannine was a former gold mining town, the site of the first discovery on the Murchison Goldfield. John Connelly discovered gold at the site northeast of Annean Station in 1890, prompting a gold rush to the area. The Murchison Goldfield was proclaimed in September 1891 and the town gazetted in 1893. It was the first town in the region.

By 1894 the town was large enough to be given its own electoral district. In 1896 construction began on a railway between Nannine and Cue, Western Australia, which was completed in 1903. The continuation of the line to Meekatharra was begun in 1909.

== History ==
Nannine is an Aboriginal name, "Nannine Wells" being first recorded by a surveyor in 1889. The meaning of the name is 'fat', used of a place in the indigenous landscape where the primordial Dingo of the dreaming bit off part of an Emu, leaving a trace of the act in a local cliff-face, which the Aboriginal people called 'nganiny'. The earliest days of gold discovery at this site are shrouded in controversy, but according to one source it is likely that the first suspicions of gold in the area were apparently held by Ingpen and Watts, station hands on the Annean pastoral station. In about May 1890 they showed the site to J. F. Connolly, a New South Wales mining engineer, who found gold but he does not appear to have been too impressed. In October 1890 McPherson and Peterkin were directed to the same site and found significant quantities of gold. By August 1891 they and others had recovered about 53 kilograms (1,700 ozt) of gold. The Murchison Goldfield, which included Nannine was proclaimed in September 1891. By December about seven hundred men were at the field.

The original settlement was down in a gully area between the later town and the mines to the east and north of the town. In 1892 John Forrest, the Commissioner for Crown Lands decided to have lots surveyed and a townsite declared, although Forrest referred to the place as "Annean", the name of the nearby pastoral station. When the local miners heard the auction of lots was to be in Perth, eighty five of them petitioned Forrest to have the auction in Geraldton. The lots were surveyed in August 1892, and the townsite named Nannine, as "it is situated 10 miles [16 km] from Annean Station and 3 miles [4.8 km] from Nannine Wells", and was also the name of the proposed electoral district and adjacent gold mining lease. The townsite was gazetted in April 1893. Following the survey and the release of the town blocks for purchase, many if not all of the existing premises including the businesses moved to the official townsite. Exactly how rapidly this migration occurred is not known, but it was apparently complete by 1896/7. This may have resulted in some businesses closing down, not wishing to make the move to rated land.

The town and surrounding area was inundated by heavy rains in 1913, Nannine receiving 46 millimetres (1.82 in) in a day, causing the railway line to Meekatharra to be flooded and creating a washway a few miles north of the town.

By 1919 the town was in deep decline.

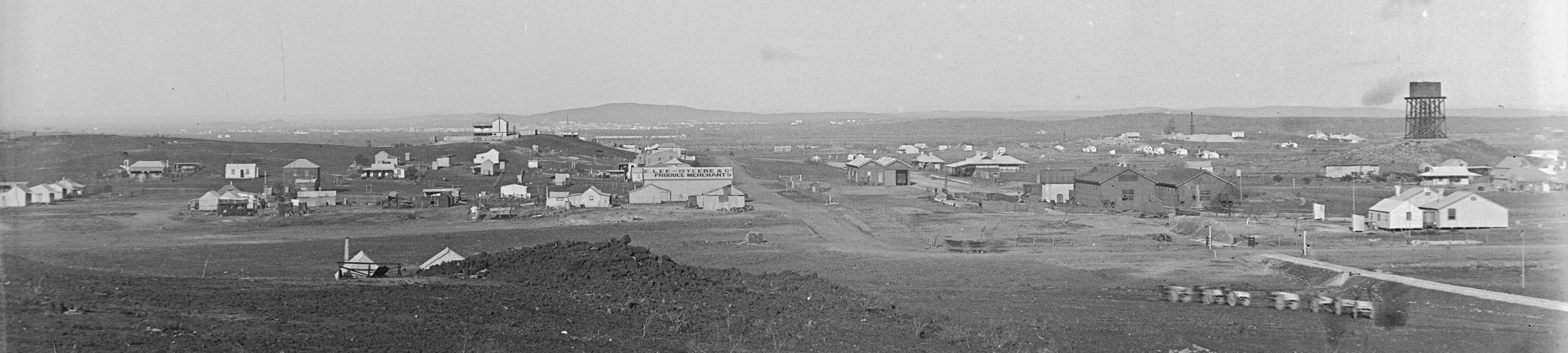
Panorama of Nannine c. 1907

== Utilities ==
In November 1906 the town water supply was opened.

== Local government ==
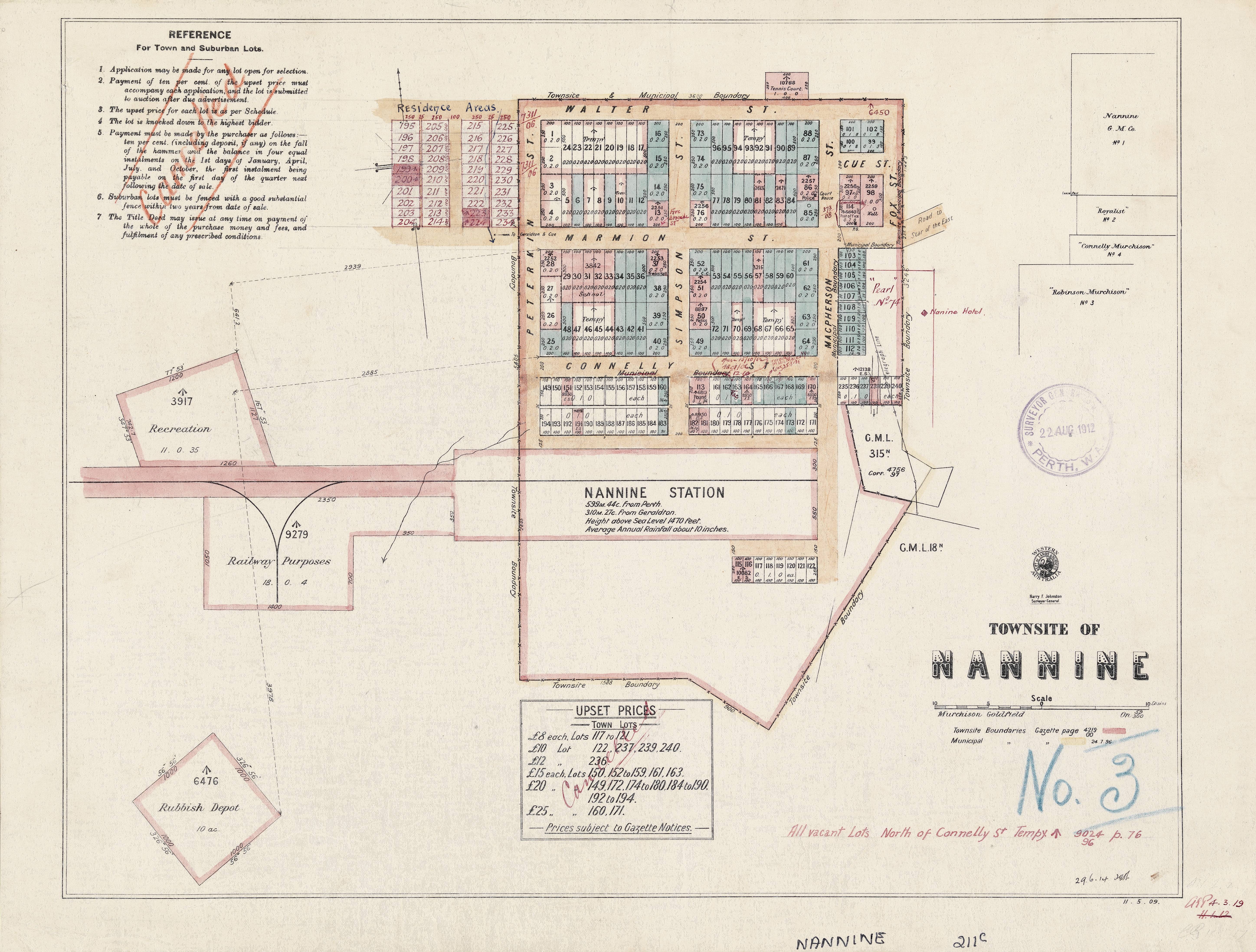
Cadastral map of Nannine townsite, 1909

The Nannine Road District was established on 13 October 1893. The Municipality of Nannine, covering the townsite itself, separated from the road district on 22 July 1896. The road district was abolished on 29 October 1909, but was re-established on 2 April 1913, when the municipality was merged into a reconstituted, smaller road district. The road district was abolished again on 24 January 1930.

A. C. Twine was the first town clerk.

J. L. Masterdon appears to have been the first mayor.

== Mining Warden ==
By 1893 the Wardens Court was still a tent with a notice board at the front, but fortunately construction began on a stone building for the Warden's Court and Registrars office in March 1896.

Walters, W. A. G. – The first mining Warden at Nannine. He arrived in September 1891.

== Police and courts ==
A Police Station was built in 1896. The station was closed in January 1922 and the building removed to Yalgoo sometime that year.

Binnings, [Constable] – He was in the area by September 1891 although he cannot be specifically pinpointed to Nannine until April 1892.

== Cemetery ==
By 1896/7 there were about six graves in front of Judges Hotel in Simpson Street, but at the time they were due to be moved.

== Education ==
The Reverend Gilbert Harding opened a school alongside his residence in March 1906. This was for the convenience of parents with children who lived where no school was established. Boarders were especially catered for.

== Transport services ==
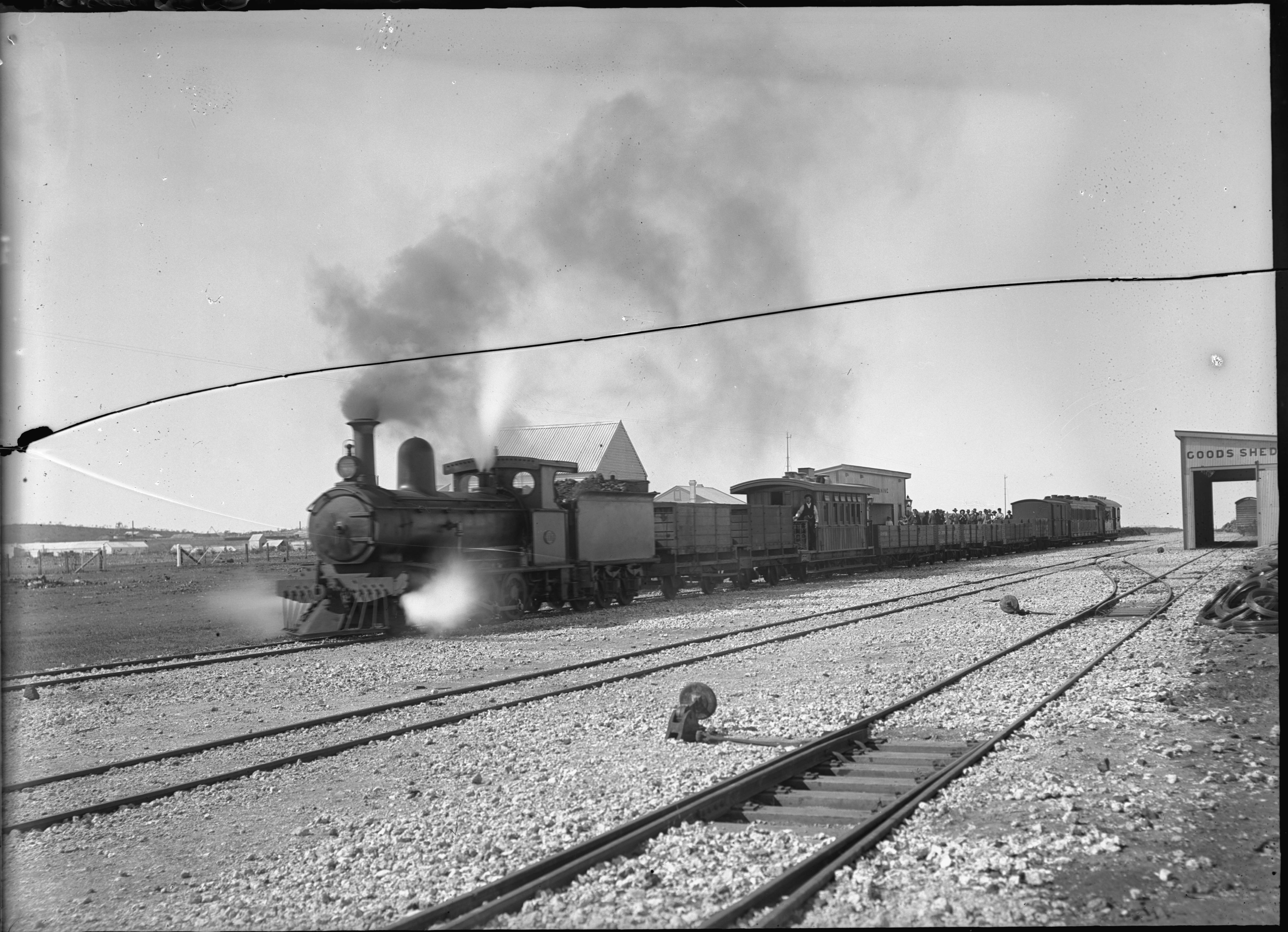
Steam train at Nannine railway station, c. 1905

In January 1892 Spalding began a coach service from Mingenew to Annean and Marsh ran one from Geraldton to Nannine from July the same year. In 1897 the postal directory records twice weekly Gascard coaches from Yalgoo. The West Australian Tuesday 6 January 1903 records the opening of the 'railway line from Cue to Nannine'.

== Postal & Communication Services ==
A telegraph line to Geraldton commenced service in November 1894. Work on the stone post and telegraph building began in March 1896 at the corner of Marmion & McPherson Streets in 1896/7.

Twine, A. C. – He is listed as the Postmaster in the 1897 postal directory.

== Hotels and accommodation ==
Original Townsite
The earliest recorded hotel was opened by Dan DOWNIE in January 1892, but it may not have been the first hotel built. It is probably the Pioneer hotel recorded as one of five existing hotels in March that year. The others were the Royal, the Excelsior, the Murchison and the Nannine. Mrs RAMSAY, hostess of the Murchison was the first woman at the field.

Gazetted Townsite
HOTEL – Downey & Murphy were listed together as hotel and storekeepers in the 1894 postal directory.

=== The Pioneer ===
Downie & Murphy are listed as hotel and Storekeepers in the 1894 postal directory. This is assumed to be the Pioneer Hotel as DOWNIE had shifted his earlier hotel from the old townsite and was running the business as the Pioneer hotel on McPherson Street in the gazetted town in 1896/7. He had presumably retained the business name from the previous site. David DOWNIE's entry in the 1897 postal directory links him with the Pioneer Hotel and store. It is not known whether these were distinct premises. It was one of four hotels trading in 1898.

=== The Royal ===
John DENNIS was listed there in the 1894 postal directory, but by 1897 the postal directory lists Robert J. RIDLEY. The hotel was still trading in December 1909.

=== The Victoria ===
In 1895 Mr KELLY's refitted brick Victoria Hotel, was refused a licence on the grounds of there being insufficient population, although it had been licensed in earlier years.

=== The Victory ===
There had been a Victory Hotel prior to it being leased as a boarding house in 1893. The 1895 post office directory listed V. BARDEN. T MacDONALD, the then lessee was going to apply to have it re-licensed in 1896. E. B. SOUGHTON is listed at the hotel in the 1897 postal directory.

=== Judge's Hotel ===
In 1896/7 this hotel on Simpson Street was the largest building in town.

=== The Nannine ===
Listed 'For Sale By Tender' late in 1899, the hotel was described as being splendidly furnished throughout, of iron construction and containing a large bar, three parlours, a drawing room, dining room and 12 bedrooms, plus appliances. It boasted a large billiard room fitted out with a renowned 'Alcock' table, and was advertised to include stables, outhouses and a butcher's shop, and was purported to have an annual turnover of three thousand Australian pounds. In January 1907 there was an explosion of a gasometer at the hotel, which blew the roof off one of the outhouses. Mrs Eleanor WILLOWS (née SPENCER), the live in manager at the time, was reported to have been unscathed. 'Mum Willows', as she was known, managed the hotel on her own from the time it came into the hands of Mr William SNELL in 1904, until she moved to Meekatharra in 1920.

=== The North Murchison ===
It was one of four hotels trading in 1898, and was the town's last hotel when it closed down in the 1940s.

== Other Businesses ==
Original townsite
By August 1891 CRUIKSHANKS had opened a small shop on the field. This was presumably one of the CRUIKSHANK's of Annean station. By March 1892 ALDERMAN, URCH, BRAND, FOGG and McINNES had all started grocery story stores and DURACK was operating as a butcher. DUFF who joined the line up of general stores in by July also had a branch in Cue. James BROWN also had a store there.

Gazetted townsite

BAKER – James BOND is listed as a baker in the 1895 postal directory, and by 1896/7 J & J BOND's galvanised iron shop and bakehouse were described as being on Marmion Street. James and John BOND were also advertising as confectioners by the time of their 1897 postal directory listing.

BLACKSMITH 1 – The 1895 postal directory lists C. A. BOSTON, and he is still listed in the 1897 directory.

BLACKSMITH 2 – By 1896/7 Marmion Street included Mr MAIN's blacksmith shop.

BLACKSMITH – The 1897 postal directory lists P. M. DUNNE.

BLACKSMITH – The 1897 postal directory lists C. JAMES.

BUILDER & CONTRACTOR – John DAWSON and Robert BOYNTON of Dawson & Boynton are listed in the 1897 postal directory.

BUTCHER 1 – By 1896/7 J Meehan & Co's butchers shop was on Marmion Street, and John & James MEEHAN are listed in the 1897 postal directory.

BUTCHER 2 – The 1897 postal directory lists A. J. EDWARDS as butcher & store.

BUTCHER 3 – The 1897 postal directory lists H. P. Sprigg & Co as butchers and produce merchants.

COOL DRINK FACTORY – By 1896/7 J. C. ANDREWS & Sons mineral water factory was on Marmion Street.

HAIRDRESSER 1 – The 1897 postal directory lists T. Anthony & Co.

HAIRDRESSER 2 – The 1897 postal directory lists A. STURM.

MARKET GARDEN – By 1896/7 J. &J. BOND had a market garden about 8 kilometres east of town.

MINING AGENT 1 – J. C. SHERRINGTON is listed in the 1894 postal directory.

MINING AGENT[S] 2 – By 1896/7 MacPherson Street had offices for TIMPERLEY-MASTERTON & TWINE.

MERCHANT 1 – The 1894 postal directory listed John URCH.

NEWSAGENTS & PHOTOGRAPHERS – A. De Courcey & Co are listed in the 1897 postal directory.

STONEMASON – The 1897 postal directory lists both James McNAIR and S. MANGAN.

STOREKEEPER 1 – James BROWN was the first person to move his store onto the newly gazetted townsite and by 1896/7 it is recorded on Marmion Street. He was listed in the 1897 postal directory.

STOREKEEPER 2 – The 1894 postal directory listed J. F. Duff & Co.

STOREKEEPER 3 – By 1896/7 MacPherson Street had William SMALL's general store on the corner with Marmion Street.

STOREKEEPER 4 – Downie & Murphy are listed as hotel and Storekeepers in the 1894 postal directory. This would appear to be related to David DOWNIE's entry in the 1897 postal directory which links him with the Pioneer Hotel and store. It is not known whether these were distinct premises.

STOREKEEPER 5 – Eves & Co stayed in business until about 1940.

STOREKEEPER 6 – The 1897 postal directory included O. P. TIMPERLEY and J. T. F. MASTERTON of Timperley & Masterton as storekeepers, and mining and commission agents.

STOREKEEPER 7 – Urch & Ridley are included in the 1897 postal directory.

UNKNOWN – In 1911 Margolin & Co announced that they were closing their business in Nannine.

VETERINARY? SURGEON – Robert CONWAY was listed in the 1897 postal directory.

== Halls and churches ==
A timber and iron Miners Institute was erected in 1896. The only church building to that date in the town Roman Catholic. The Miners Institute hall was handed over to the Municipal Council to manage in 1910.

=== The Masonic Hall ===
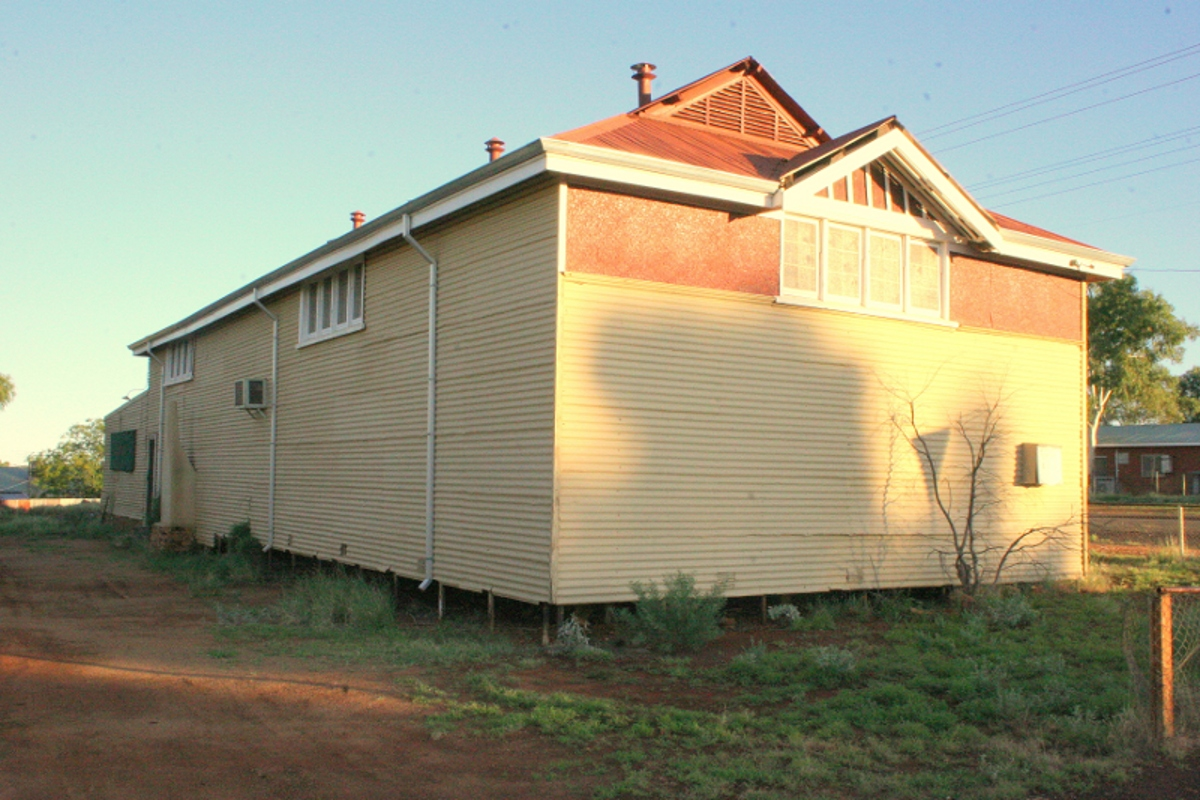
Cnr Savage and Darlot Streets, Meekatharra, Western Australia 26°35′37.24″S 118°29′52.32″E

Freemasonry was a significant part of the social fabric of many rural and remote towns across Australia during the first half of the 20th century. The Masonic Hall was originally built in Nannine around 1900, and then transported to Meekatharra when Nannine began to fade some 20 years later. In listing the building on its Register, the Heritage Council of WA depicts it as being of "Federation Gothic" architectural style. It lists the building's "Historic Themes" as being "social and civic activities, sport, recreation and entertainment". The listing goes on to describe the Hall as being "a large timber framed corrugated iron clad rectangular building with a red iron roof. Timber framed windows are set high under the eaves, and there is a small feature gable over the east window. The roof is punctuated by three metal vents. There is a corrugated iron addition to the rear of the building, and two separate toilets."

Today, the Hall stands on the corner of Savage and Darlot Streets, Meekatharra, Western Australia as a distinctive if somewhat forlorn reminder of times now long past.

== Sources ==
- Liberman, Kenneth (Spring 1980). "The Decline of the Kuwarra People of Australia's Western Desert: A Case Study of Legally Secured Domination". Ethnohistory. 27 (2): 119–133. doi:10.2307/481223. JSTOR 481223.

== See also ==
- Annean Station, Cruickshanks, near Murchison Goldfields. 1891 – via State Library of South Australia.
