= Peak Hill, Western Australia =

Ghost town in Western Australia

Peak Hill
- Town
- Coordinates: 25°38′00″S 118°43′00″E
- Country: Australia
- State: Western Australia
- LGA: Shire of Meekatharra
- Location: 885 km (550 mi) north east of Perth; 120 km (75 mi) north of Meekatharra
- Established: 1897

Government
  - State electorate: North West
  - Federal division: Durack

Area
  - Total: 26,524.1 km^{2} (10,241.0 sq mi)
- Elevation: 608 m (1,995 ft)

Population
  - Total: 121 (SAL 2021)
- Postcode: 6642

Peak Hill is the name of a goldfield, locality and the site of a gold mining ghost town in the Murchison Region of Western Australia. The gold mine covers 2,162 hectares and consists of four open-cut mines: Main, Jubilee, Fiveways and Harmony.

In the adjacent region to the locality, there are considerable non-auriferous mineral deposits. Adjacent fields included the Horseshoe field.

Early exploration at the site occurred in the 1890s, when gold was discovered by William John Wilson in 1892. The townsite was gazetted in 1897, and the field has had varied fortunes even in early years. Before 1913, the mine produced some 270,000 ounces (7.7 tonnes) of gold. Peak Hill was also included as a location in a regional newspaper network of more outlying mining communities in the 1920s and 1930s.

The population of the town was 190 (180 males and 10 females) in 1898.

Alfred Walker, the proprietor of the Peak Hill General Store until 1954, was the last full-time resident of Peak Hill. He retired to his daughter's farm at Peppermint Grove, south of Capel.

In the 1970s, it was reduced to a ghost town with a few remaining residents, however in the 1980s activity resumed, producing around 650,000 ounces (18.4 tonnes) of gold. The mine became dormant again in the 2000s.

== Horseshoe mine and railway ==
The Meekatharra-Horseshoe Railway Act 1920, assented to on 31 December 1920, authorised the construction of the railway line from Meekatharra, where it intersected the Mullewa–Meekatharra railway, to the Horseshoe mine, north-west of Peak Hill. The private 85-mile-long (137 km) railway was short-lived, existing from 1927 until 1933, when the company mining manganese went into receivership.
