= Meekatharra, Western Australia =

Meekatharra
- Town
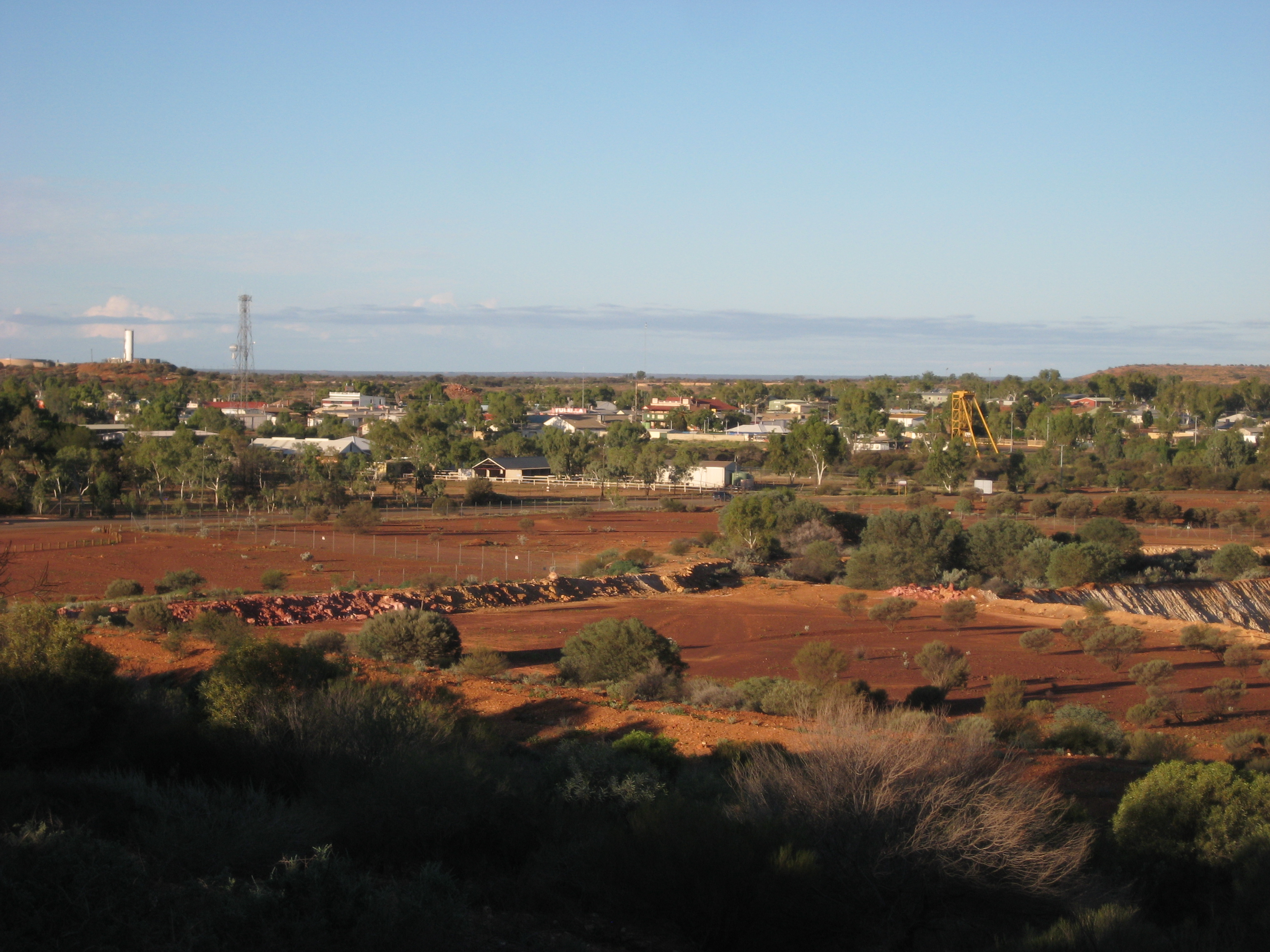
- View of Meekatharra from the local lookout

- Interactive map of Meekatharra
- Coordinates: 26°35′37″S 118°29′43″E
- Country: Australia
- State: Western Australia
- LGA: Shire of Meekatharra
- Location: 771 km (479 mi) NNE of Perth; 538 km (334 mi) NE of Geraldton; 645 km (401 mi) ESE of Carnarvon

Government
  - State electorate: Mid-West
  - Federal division: Durack

Area
  - Total: 26,588.7 km^{2} (10,266.0 sq mi)
- Elevation: 517 m (1,696 ft)

Population
  - Total: 675 (UCL 2021)
- Postcode: 6642
- Mean max temp: 29.0 °C (84.2 °F)
- Mean min temp: 15.9 °C (60.6 °F)
- Annual rainfall: 237.9 mm (9.37 in)

Meekatharra is a town in the Mid West region of Western Australia. Meekatharra is a Yamatji word meaning "place of little water". At the 2016 census, Meekatharra had a population of 708, with 34.0% being of Aboriginal descent.

Meekatharra is a major supply centre for the pastoral and mining area in the Murchison region of Western Australia. It is located 764 km (475 mi) north-east of Perth and may be reached by the Great Northern Highway. It is a centre for sheep and cattle transshipment, initially by rail but now by road trains. It is also a regional home to the Royal Flying Doctor Service and the School of the Air. No viable horticultural industry exists in the area, although extensive but poor cattle stations in the Murchison and Gascoyne exist.

== History ==
Meekatharra is a former gold rush town. It seems the first settlement at Meekatharra occurred in 1894 and that, in May 1896, after the prospectors Meehan, Porter and Soich discovered gold, miners moved to the new settlement from the other East Murchison fields and mining grew rapidly in scale and sophistication. The Peak Hill mining town was founded in 1892 approximately 100 km up the road during this initial gold rush.

Success in the Meekatharra field was short-lived. It was only because a second gold discovery occurred in 1899 that the town survived. In 1901 the Meekatharra State Battery began operation and by Christmas Day 1903 the township had been officially gazetted.

In 1906 Alfred Wernam Canning was appointed to develop a stock route from the East Kimberley to the Murchison. The stock route, comprising 54 wells, was completed in 1908 and, when the railway arrived in Meekatharra in 1910, the town became the railhead at the end of the route. In many ways the railway ensured the town's survival. In 1910 it took the first shipment of wool out of the area and it continued to serve the local pastoral interests until it was closed down in 1978.

The town and surrounding stations were isolated by flood waters in 1926 resulting in provisions in the town running low after supplies were unable to get through after a week.

From 1927 until 1931, a railway line operated from Meekatharra to the manganese mine at Horseshoe, some 130 kilometres (80 miles) distant.

Meekatharra underwent a significant gold rush during the mining boom of the 1980s, with mining continuing until May 2004 at St Barbara Mines's Bluebird Gold Mine. Exploration restarted in the area and St Barbara sold out to a company known as Mercator Gold in October 2005. Mercator Gold then conducted an extensive drilling programme and re-opened the mill, commencing production in early October 2007. This mining phase, however, was short-lived, with Mercator going into administration in October 2008 and closing the mine.

A substantial gold deposit which lies just south of the townsite called the Paddy's Flat area was explored and mined by Western Mining Corporation and Dominion Mining Ltd in the 1990s.

== Climate ==
The climate is hot and dry. The annual rainfall is between 200 and 300 millimetres (8 and 12 in). The driest months of the year are August through to November.

Climate data for Meekatharra (Meekatharra Airport)
Month	Jan	Feb	Mar	Apr	May	Jun	Jul	Aug	Sep	Oct	Nov	Dec	Year
Record high °C (°F)	47.1 (116.8)	46.9 (116.4)	44.5 (112.1)	40.6 (105.1)	36.0 (96.8)	29.0 (84.2)	29.2 (84.6)	33.4 (92.1)	38.5 (101.3)	41.0 (105.8)	44.0 (111.2)	46.0 (114.8)	47.1 (116.8)
Mean daily maximum °C (°F)	38.4 (101.1)	36.9 (98.4)	34.3 (93.7)	29.3 (84.7)	23.9 (75.0)	19.8 (67.6)	19.3 (66.7)	21.8 (71.2)	25.9 (78.6)	30.0 (86.0)	33.5 (92.3)	36.7 (98.1)	29.2 (84.6)
Daily mean °C (°F)	31.5 (88.7)	30.4 (86.7)	27.9 (82.2)	23.2 (73.8)	18.0 (64.4)	14.3 (57.7)	13.4 (56.1)	15.3 (59.5)	18.8 (65.8)	22.7 (72.9)	26.2 (79.2)	29.5 (85.1)	22.6 (72.7)
Mean daily minimum °C (°F)	24.5 (76.1)	23.9 (75.0)	21.5 (70.7)	17.1 (62.8)	12.1 (53.8)	8.8 (47.8)	7.5 (45.5)	8.7 (47.7)	11.7 (53.1)	15.4 (59.7)	18.9 (66.0)	22.3 (72.1)	16.0 (60.8)
Record low °C (°F)	12.2 (54.0)	12.3 (54.1)	10.3 (50.5)	5.7 (42.3)	1.7 (35.1)	0.4 (32.7)	−0.2 (31.6)	0.0 (32.0)	3.0 (37.4)	4.3 (39.7)	8.0 (46.4)	11.1 (52.0)	−0.2 (31.6)
Average precipitation mm (inches)	29.3 (1.15)	35.4 (1.39)	30.7 (1.21)	18.9 (0.74)	21.5 (0.85)	28.9 (1.14)	19.9 (0.78)	10.5 (0.41)	4.9 (0.19)	5.9 (0.23)	12.0 (0.47)	14.3 (0.56)	232.4 (9.15)
Average precipitation days	4.5	4.6	4.6	4.2	4.3	5.9	5.3	3.6	1.9	1.7	2.5	3.2	46.3

== Transport ==
Meekatharra was an important location in the Western Australian Government Railways system – being the northernmost location in the Northern Railway railway network, apart from the isolated Marble Bar Railway branch out of Port Hedland. For a while a further branch line continued eastwards to Wiluna. The line was closed from Mullewa and pulled up in the 1970s. In the 2000s, new iron ore prospects may see the railway return.

A 2,181-metre (7,156-foot) runway, now known as Meekatharra Airport, was built by the Americans during World War II. It serves as an important ETOPS diversion airport for inbound transcontinental flights to Australia. Skippers Aviation provide services to Perth on Monday, Wednesday, Thursday and Friday.

Transwa operates coach services from Geraldton to Meekatharra on Mondays and Thursdays, returning Tuesdays and Fridays with connecting services to Perth. Integrity Coach Lines operates services between Perth and Port Hedland on Tuesdays, stopping in Meekatharra. The return service operates on Thursdays.

== In popular culture ==
Meekatharra is mentioned in Kevin Bloody Wilson's 1985 song "Living Next Door To Alan".

== Notable people ==
- Don McLeod, activist
- Jane Gerick, politician
- Gwilym Kessey, cricketer
- David Ngoombujarra, actor was born in Meekatharra
- Carl Peterson, Australian rules footballer
- Billy Snedden, politician
- Richard Walley, Aboriginal Australian performer and musician
