= Acacia exocarpoides =

Scientific classification
- Kingdom: Plantae
- Clade: Tracheophytes
- Clade: Angiosperms
- Clade: Eudicots
- Clade: Rosids
- Order: Fabales
- Family: Fabaceae
- Subfamily: Caesalpinioideae
- Clade: Mimosoid clade
- Genus: Acacia
- Species: A. exocarpoides

Binomial name
- Acacia exocarpoides W.Fitzg.
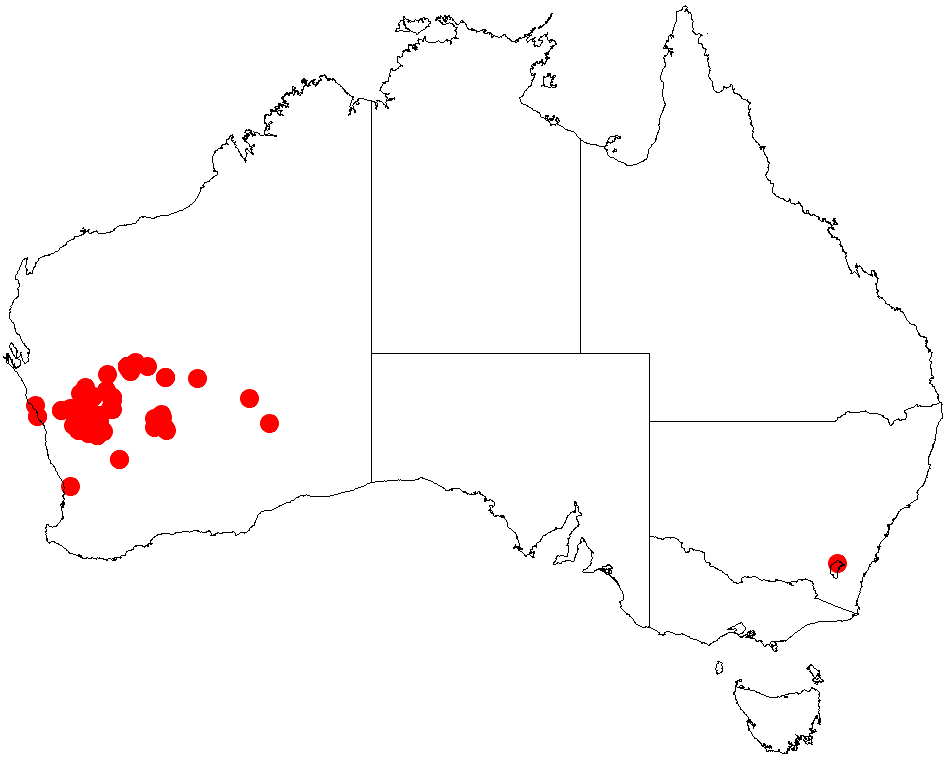
- Occurrence data from AVH

Synonyms
- Racosperma exocarpoides (W.Fitzg.) Pedley

Species of legume

Acacia exocarpoides is a species of flowering plant in the family Fabaceae and is endemic to Western Australia. It is a broom-like, glabrous shrub with erect, spiny branchlets, few, inconspicuous phyllodes, spherical heads of golden yellow flowers and thinly leathery pods somewhat like a string of beads.

== Description ==
Acacia exocarpoides is a fastigiate, glabrous shrub that typically grows to a height of 1–3 m (3 ft 3 in – 9 ft 10 in). Its outermost branchlets are ascending to erect, straight and sparingly divided, terete, finely striated and coarsely spiny. There are few, inconspicuous phyllodes that are frequently shed, 8–18 mm (0.31–0.71 in) long and 1 mm (0.039 in) wide with four veins. The flowers are borne in a spherical head in axils, on a peduncle 5–10 mm (0.20–0.39 in) long, each head with 28 to 35 golden yellow flowers. Flowering occurs from June to August, and the pods are thinly leathery, up to 150 mm (5.9 in) long and 5–7 mm (0.20–0.28 in) wide, dark brown and superficially resemble a string of beads. The seeds are egg-shaped, 4–6 mm (0.16–0.24 in) long and shiny dark brown to blackish, with a dull yellow, waxy aril as long as the seed.

== Taxonomy ==
Acacia exocarpoides was first formally described in 1904 by William Vincent Fitzgerald in the Journal of the West Australian Natural History Society from specimens he collected between Lennonville and Boogardie in 1903. Fitzgerald noted "without flowers, this remarkable species would be readily passed by as Exocarpus aphylla, R.Br.", (now known as Exocarpos aphyllus). The specific epithet (exocarpoides) means 'Exocarpus-like'.

== Distribution ==
This species of wattle grows in rocky, clayey loam near Meekatharra, in the Mount Gibson-Mullewa-Mount Magnet area and in the Rutters Soak-Rason Lake area of the Great Victoria Desert, where it is usually found in Acacia aneura communities, in the Avon Wheatbelt, Great Victoria Desert, Murchison and Yalgoo bioregions of Western Australia.

== Conservation status ==
Acacia exocarpoides is listed as "not threatened" by the Government of Western Australia Department of Biodiversity, Conservation and Attractions.

== See also ==
- List of Acacia species
