= Boogardie Station =

Pastoral lease in Western Australia

Coordinates: 28°02′21″S 117°14′14″E

Location in Western Australia

Boogardie Station is a pastoral lease that operates as a sheep station in Western Australia.

It is situated approximately 20 kilometres (12 mi) west of Mount Magnet and 72 km (45 mi) south west of Cue on Palmers Well Road.

It has in its area Boogardie quarry, and is situated away from the location of the ghost town Boogardie.

Robert Austin traversed the area as part of an expedition in 1854, reporting it as a fine goldfield and good grazing country. The Jones family established the station in about 1880.

The property occupied an area of 374,000 acres (151,352 ha) in 1931 when the owner Henry Jones died.

In 2011 the property was held by brothers David, Paul, Henry and John Jones who are all descendants of the Jones family that originally settled the property. The station's sheep flock had contracted to about 7,000 head of sheep after several dry seasons.

== See also ==
- List of ranches and stations
- List of pastoral leases in Western Australia
