= Boogardie =

Boogardie may refer to:

- Boogardie, Western Australia, an abandoned town
- Boogardie Station, a pastoral lease and sheep station in Western Australia
- Boogardie quarry, located on Boogardie Station, a deposit of orbicular granite
