= Hill 50 Gold Mine =

Gold mine in Western Australia

Hill 50
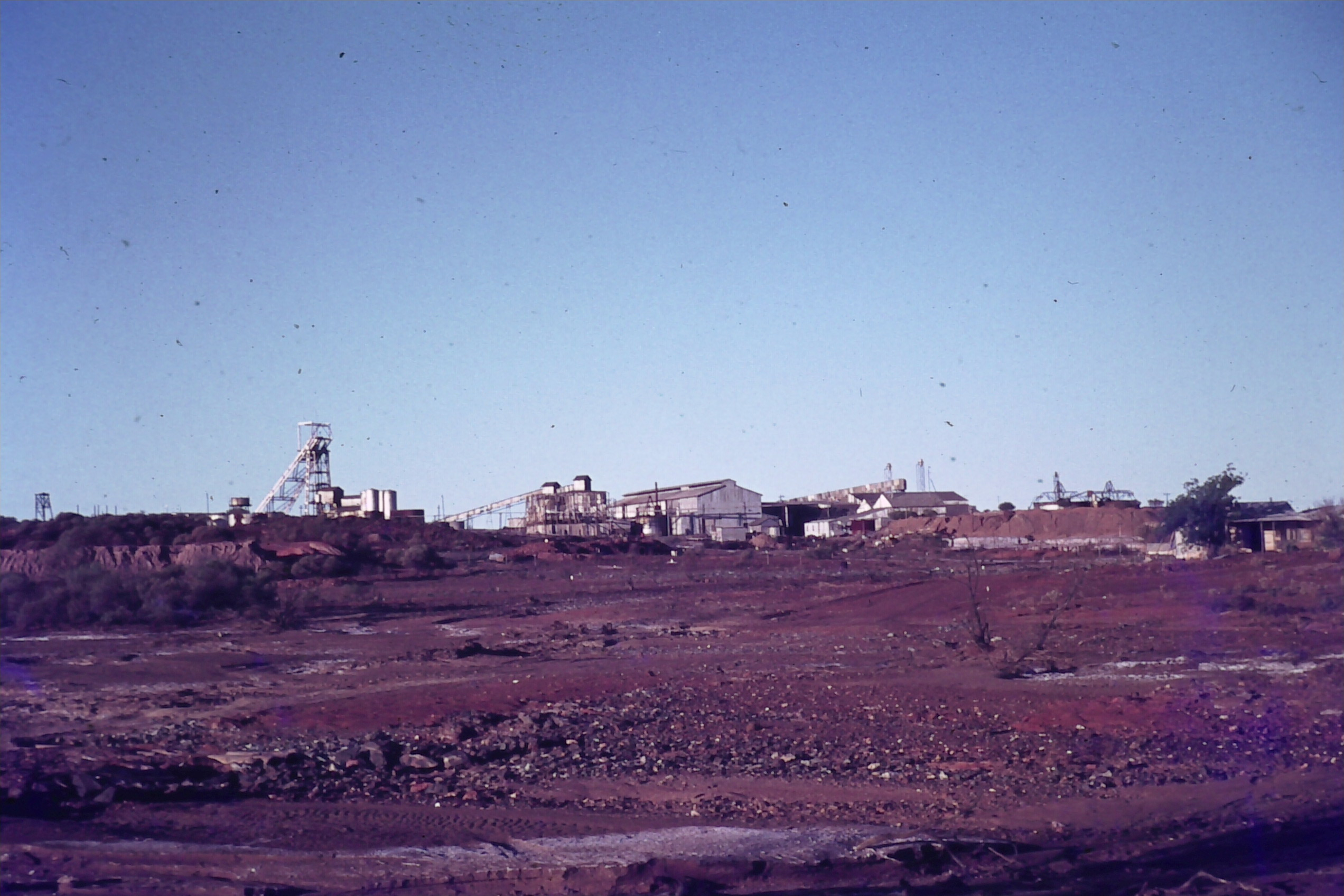
- Hill 50 poppet head c1980 when the mine was an underground operation, all buildings and foreground are now part of the opencut

- Location in Western Australia
- Interactive map of Hill 50
- Location: Mount Magnet, Western Australia; 28°01′45″S 117°48′52″E
- Products: Gold
- Production: 127,943 troy ounces
- Financial year: 2022–23
- Opened: 1890s
- Company: Ramelius Resources
- Website: www.rameliusresources.com.au
- Acquired: 2010

The Hill 50 Gold Mine, now referred to as the Mount Magnet Gold Mine, is a gold mine located 4 km north-west of Mount Magnet, Western Australia. The mine was, until July 2010, owned by Harmony Gold and had been placed in care and maintenance since 2007. In July 2010, Harmony sold the mine to Ramelius Resources, owner of the Wattle Dam Gold Mine, for A$40 million.

The mine was, for a short time in 2008, owned by Monarch Gold Mining Company, who went into administration in June 2008. Hill 50 never entered production under Monarch's ownership. Throughout its history, since 1891, the mine has produced in excess of 5.6 million ounces of gold.

== History ==
Gold mines in the Mid West region

At the turn of the 19th century, Hill 50 was the dominant mine out of 30 gold mines in Mount Magnet. It was regarded as a mine which would last forever, but fell into decline after 1915, when many miners went off to fight in World War I.

Hill 50 Gold Mines N.L., which was floated on the Perth Stock Exchange in 1934 to acquire the Sidar leases at Boogardie, started mining Hill 50 in 1936. From a moderate sized operation, the Hill 50 mine grew to produce 13,500 ounces per annum by the outbreak of World War II. Mining continued, on reduced manpower, during the war.

Hill 50's ore reserves were depleted to 73,000 tonnes during the war but, unlike the Hill 60 and St George mines, Hill 50 produced some successful drilling results in 1949 and remained operating. A steel shaft, transported across from Broken Hill, was erected at the mine in 1956.

Up until 1959, ore was hauled from the underground operations via a steam winder. In the late 1950s, the mine produced almost 100,000 ounces of gold per annum, resulting in a yearly profit of close to A£1 million at the time, or A$30 million in current value. This result made Hill 50 Australia's most profitable mine between 1955 and 1961.

From 1961 onwards, profits gradually decreased because of lowering grade and the increasing depth the ore was hauled up from, below 1,000 meters. When Hill 50 closed in 1976, it had produced 1.4 million ounces of gold from 3.6 million tonnes of ore for a value of A$700 million.

In 1974, WMC Resources acquired an interest in Hill 50 Gold Mines Limited. WMC later took complete control of the company and mine in 1987.

When the mine reopened in the 1980s, its main source of ore was the Morning Star shaft, which had already been mined from 1966 to 1976.

Wattle Gully Gold Mines, later to become Hill 50 Gold, a company with an initial capital of A$50,000, acquired the mine from WMC Resources in 1997 and achieved a turnaround of the old but declining mining operations at Hill 50.

Hill 50 Gold acquired a second gold mine when it purchased the New Celebration Gold Mine from Newcrest in June 2001 for A$10 million.

Harmony announced a take over bid for Hill 50 Gold Limited in December 2001 and compulsory acquired outstanding Hill 50 shares and listed options in April 2002, after achieving a 99% interest in the company. Harmony paid A$233 million for this acquisition. The driving forces behind Hill 50 Gold, Sydney businessmen Peter Cook and Peter Newton, later also sold another gold mining company to Harmony, Abelle Limited, for A$155 million in 2003.

Hill 50 became part of Harmony's Australian operations, consisting of Hill 50, the South Kalgoorlie Gold Mine, the Big Bell Gold Mine (closed June 2003) and the Gidgee Gold Mine (sold in December 2003).

Harmony announced the closure of the mine from December 2007, stating a lack of production reserves as the reason and placing the mine on the market.

Monarch Gold purchased the mine from Harmony in November 2007 in a deal that saw the company acquire Hill 50, Big Bell, St George, Star and the Great Finegal deposits for A$65 million, 30 million of this in cash. Monarch already owned the Mount Ida and the Davyhurst Gold Mine, who had both recently entered production at the time.

Monarch planned to leave Hill 50 in care and maintenance for up to two more years and carry out an extensive exploration effort in the area, budgeted at A$10 million per year. Monarch was to take possession of the mine on 1 April 2008 and complete the financial transaction on 30 June 2008, but failed to make the final payment before entering administration, despite receiving improved sales conditions and a cash-cost reduction.

Monarch appointed Pitcher Partners as voluntary administrators on 10 July 2008, with all mining operations thereby being put on hold. Hill 50 thereby returned to Harmony's ownership, Harmony not having received the final payment of the sale.

After being unable to re-sell the mine, Harmony conducted a study in regards to carrying out mining at Hill 50 once more. It considered the option of consolidating historic resources into one large "super pit", rather than carrying out costly underground mining.

The former Hill 50 mine is now part of Ramelius Resources's Mount Magnet Gold Mine. Apart from surface and underground mining at Mount Magnet, ore was also carted to the mine's processing plant from the Vivien mine underground operations to the north during the 2020–21 financial year. Additionally, transport of ore from the Penny Gold Mine to the south-east of Mount Magnet for processing commenced in July 2021.

== Ownership ==
Hill 50 Gold Mine Ltd owned the Hill 50 mine from 1934 onwards. Hill 50 was then partially owned by WMC Resources from 1974 until 1989, when WMC took over the remainder Hill 50 Gold Mine Ltd. In July 1997 it became part of Wattle Gully Gold Mines NL, shortly after renamed to Hill 50 Gold NL. Hill 50 Gold was acquired by Harmony Gold in June 2002 and Harmony, in turn, sold the mine to Monarch Gold Mining in November 2007. The mine reverted to Harmony in August 2008, after Monarch went into administration.

In July 2010, Harmony sold the mine to Ramelius Resources, owner of the Wattle Dam Gold Mine, for A$40 million. Rameluis plans to prove up further resources at the mine before making a decision on when to recommence production.

Ramelius Resources have been operating the Mt Magnet mine and processing plant since its reopening in late 2011. The plant was reopened after refurbishment by GR Engineering Services, and operates at ~1.7Mtpa, upgradeable to 2.4Mtpa.

== Production ==
Annual production of the mine:

Year	Production	Grade	Cost per ounce
2000	186,414 ounces	2.34 g/t	A$359
2001	196,357 ounces	2.4 g/t	A$334
2002 ^{1}	139,222 ounces	2.3 g/t	A$339
2003	509,654 ounces	2.22 g/t	
2004	338,272 ounces	2.2 g/t	US$326
2005	296,848 ounces	2.5 g/t	US$338
2006	231,517 ounces	2.33 g/t	US$419
2007	224,797 ounces	2.36 g/t	US$513
2008–2011	inactive		
2011–12			
2012–13			
2013–14			
2014–15			
2015–16			
2016–17			
2017–18	135,597 ounces	2.23 g/t	
2018–19	114,840 ounces	1.91 g/t	
2019–20	167,129 ounces	2.74 g/t	
2020–21	161,159 ounces	2.76 g/t	
2021–22	126,860 ounces	2.37 g/t	
2022–23	127,943 ounces	2.28 g/t	

- ^{1} Figures for January to September 2002 only.
- ^{2} Result for Harmony's combined Australian operations, consisting of Hill 50, the South Kalgoorlie Gold Mine, the Big Bell Gold Mine (closed June 2003) and the Gidgee Gold Mine (sold in December 2003).

== See also ==
- List of active gold mines in Western Australia
