= List of State Register of Heritage Places in the Shire of Mount Magnet =

The State Register of Heritage Places is maintained by the Heritage Council of Western Australia. As of 2026, 43 places are heritage-listed in the Shire of Mount Magnet, of which four are on the State Register of Heritage Places.

== List ==
The Western Australian State Register of Heritage Places, as of 2026, lists the following four state registered places within the Shire of Mount Magnet:

Place name	Place #	Location	Suburb or town	Co-ordinates	Built	State registered	Notes	Photo
Mount Magnet Primary School & Teachers Quarters (former)	1642	Corner Attwood and Naughton Streets	Mount Magnet	28°03′44″S 117°50′53″E	1896	26 August 2008	Also referred to as Mount Magnet Rural Transaction Centre; A former residential building in the Victorian-Georgian style and an L-shaped school, the earliest parts of which are in the Federation Free style	
Mount Magnet Primary School	24402	Lot 92 Naughton Street	Mount Magnet	28°03′44″S 117°50′53″E			Part of Mount Magnet Primary School & Teachers Quarters Precinct (1642)	
Schoolmaster's House (former)	23802	Lot 404 Naughton Street	Mount Magnet	28°03′44″S 117°50′53″E			Also referred to as Mount Magnet School (former); Part of Mount Magnet Primary School & Teachers Quarters Precinct (1642)	
Mount Magnet Shire Office	1640	Corner Hepburn and Naughton Streets	Mount Magnet	28°03′45″S 117°50′59″E	1898	5 January 2001	Also referred to as Mount Magnet Roads Board Office; A building in the Federation Free Classical style	
