= Big Bell Gold Mine =

Gold mine in Western Australia

Big Bell
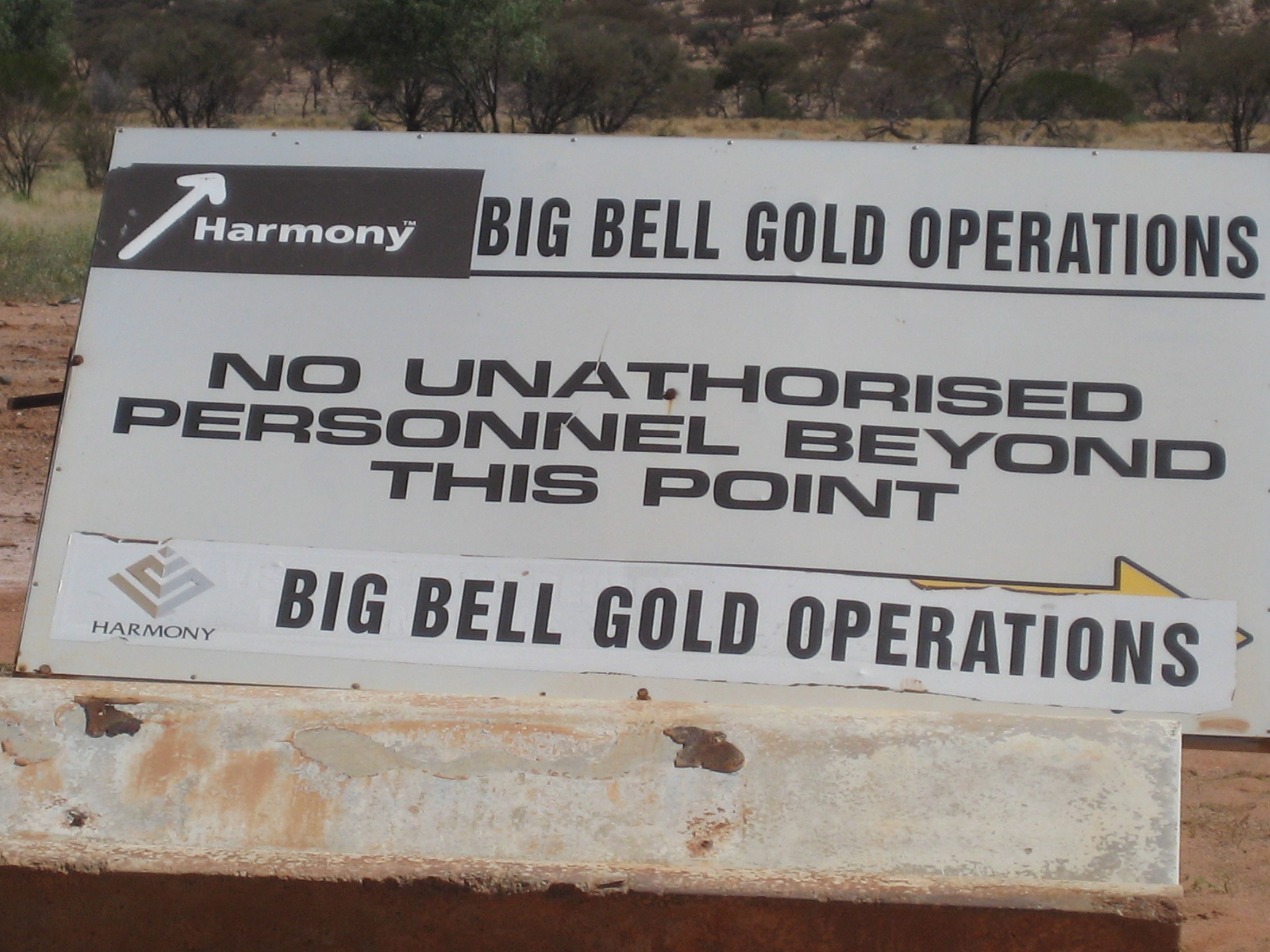
- The entrance to the mine

- Location in Western Australia
- Interactive map of Big Bell

Location
- Location: Big Bell, Western Australia, Australia; 27°19′00″S 117°39′05″E

Production
- Products: Gold
- Production: 204,937 troy ounces^{[1]}
- Financial year: 2021–22

History
- Opened: 1980s

Owner
- Company: Westgold
- Website: www.westgold.com.au

The Big Bell Gold Mine is a gold mine located at Big Bell, 24 km north-west of Cue, Western Australia. The mine was owned and operated by Harmony Gold at the time of its closure in June 2003, having produced 2.6 million ounces (73.7 metric tons) of gold during its lifetime, but was sold to Aragon Resources Limited in January 2010.

The mine was, for a short time in 2008, owned by Monarch Gold Mining Company Ltd., who went into administration in June 2008. Big Bell never entered production under Monarch's ownership.

The mine is owned by Westgold and part of its Cue Gold Operations.

== History ==
Gold mines in the Mid West region

The historical Big Bell mine produced 730,000 ounces (20.7 metric tons) of gold at 4.04 g/t from 1904 to 1955. The mine was a very big, low grade ore deposit at Paton's Find, and was developed by the Premier Gold Mining Company in the 1930s. With the closure of the mine in the mid-1950s, the town of Big Bell declined and was virtually deserted.

The mine reopened in the 1980s, then owned jointly by Australian Consolidated Minerals and Placer Pacific, having been described as Australia's biggest unexploited gold deposit at the time.

The mine was later owned by Normandy Mining until October 1999, when New Hampton Goldfields Limited acquired Big Bell for $12 million in cash and $17 million in shares. New Hampton was taken over by Harmony Gold in April 2001 for A$54 million.

Harmony closed the mine in June 2003, having found previous assessments of the grade at Big Bell over optimistic and making mining the deposits thereby unprofitable.

The Big Bell processing plant was removed from January 2007 onwards, for a cost of A$5.2 million and transported to Westonia, to become part of the new Edna May Gold Mine.

Monarch Gold purchased the mine from Harmony in November 2007 in a deal that saw the company acquire: Hill 50, Big Bell, St George, Star and the Great Fingall deposits for $65 million. Monarch already owned the Mount Ida and the Davyhurst Gold Mine, which had both recently entered production at the time.

Monarch was to take possession of the mine on 1 April 2008 and complete the financial transaction on 30 June 2008, but failed to make the final payment before entering administration, despite receiving improved sales conditions and a cash-cost reduction.

Monarch appointed Pitcher Partners as voluntary administrators on 10 July 2008, with all mining operations thereby being put on hold. Big Bell thereby returned to Harmony's ownership, Harmony not having received the final payment of the sale.

In January 2010, the mine was sold to Aragon Resources for $3 million, who chose to rename the project to "Murchison Bell". The mine was initially sold to Fulcrum Resources, which was quickly acquired by Aragon.

Aragon Resources Limited was acquired by Westgold in May 2011, with the Big Bell mine falling under their Central Murchison Gold Project.

== Operation ==
Following three years of rehabilitation and refurbishment, in 2020 ore extraction restarted. Ore from the Big Bell underground mine is processed at the Tuckabianna plant. To reduce emissions and cost from its diesel generators, a hybrid energy system with gas turbines, solar power and a grid forming battery began operating in 2024.

== Fatality ==
Rodney George Criddle, a Jumbo operator at Big Bell, died on 2 September 2000 in an underground rock fall. The underground operations of the mine were closed until 15 September following the accident. Another man Anthony John Hyde was injured.

== Production ==
Annual production of the mine:

Year	Production - ounces (metric tons)	Grade	Cost per ounce
1998-99	140,396 (4)	2.93 g/t	US$300
2000	423,355 (12)	2.85 g/t	A$419
2001	169,342 (4.8)	2.8 g/t	A$417
2002^{[2]}	71,676 (2)	2.34 g/t	
2003^{[3]}	509,654 (14.5)	2.22 g/t	
2003–2020	inactive		
2020–21	82,086 (2.3)	2.3 g/t	A$1,222
2021–22^{[1]}	204,937 (5.8)	2.5 g/t	A$1,748

=== Notes ===
- ^[1]Combined result for the Murchison Operations consisted of the Meekatharra Gold Operation and the Cue Gold Operation. The Meekatharra Gold Operation consists of the Paddy’s Flat, South Emu-Triton and Bluebird underground mines and the surface operations at Five Mile Well, Maid Marion, Albury Heath and Aladdin open pits. The Cue Gold Operation consists of the Big Bell underground mine as its primary producer, supplemented by the Comet underground mine.
- ^[2]Figures for January to June 2002 only.
- ^[3]Result for Harmony's combined Australian operations, consisting of Big Bell, the South Kalgoorlie Gold Mine, the Hill 50 Gold Mine and the Gidgee Gold Mine (sold in December 2003).
