= Yoweragabbie, Western Australia =

Yoweragabbie
- Town
- Interactive map of Yoweragabbie
- Coordinates: 28.233°S 117.633°E
- Country: Australia
- State: Western Australia
- LGA: Shire of Mount Magnet
- Location: 576 km (358 mi) NNE of Perth; 28 km (17 mi) SW of Mount Magnet
- Established: 1914

Government
  - State electorate: North West
  - Federal division: Durack
- Elevation: 376 m (1,234 ft)
- Postcode: 6638

Yoweragabbie is a small town in the Mid West region of Western Australia between the towns of Mount Magnet and Yalgoo.

The town originated as a railway siding on the Mullewa to Cue railway line in 1898 when the line was opened, which was constructed to service the surrounding pastoral stations. In 1913 land was set aside for a townsite and was gazetted in 1914. Very little development ever took place at the town.

The name of the town is Aboriginal in origin and is taken for a nearby well. The well had first been recorded on maps surveyed in 1886.

In 1896, following heavy rain, the townsite and the surrounding stations were flooded. The area was inundated again in 1926 resulting in rail services being cancelled.

A pastoral lease, Yoweragabbie Station, existed since as a lease 1880 in the area when it was owned by the Watson family. In 1926 the property had a flock of 21,800 sheep and produced a clip of 458 bales of wool. The station was sold in 1934 to the Yalgoo Pastoral Company and Dr. A. Thompson for over £38,000, at this stage it occupied an area of 354,796 acres (143,581 ha) and had a carrying capacity of 30,000 sheep. The Yoweragabbie railway siding was situated on the property which shared boundaries with Murrum, Nalbarra and Mundinia Stations.
