= Poison Rocks =

Rock formation in Western Australia

Location in Western Australia

Poison Rocks, historically known as Poison Rock, is a rock formation in Western Australia. It is located at 28°42′S 118°30′E, 100 km south-east of Mount Magnet in the Shire of Sandstone. The explorer Robert Austin named the place after camping there during his expedition of 1854. While he was there, nine of his horses died from eating poisonous plants, and he was forced to leave behind two more who were near death.

In 1869, John Forrest led an expedition in search of the long lost explorer Ludwig Leichhardt. His party met a group of Aboriginal people who offered to take them to a place where the skeletons of many horses could be seen. Forrest travelled with the group for a week, until it became clear that he was being led to Poison Rocks. He then resumed his earlier course.

== See also ==
- List of rocks in Western Australia
