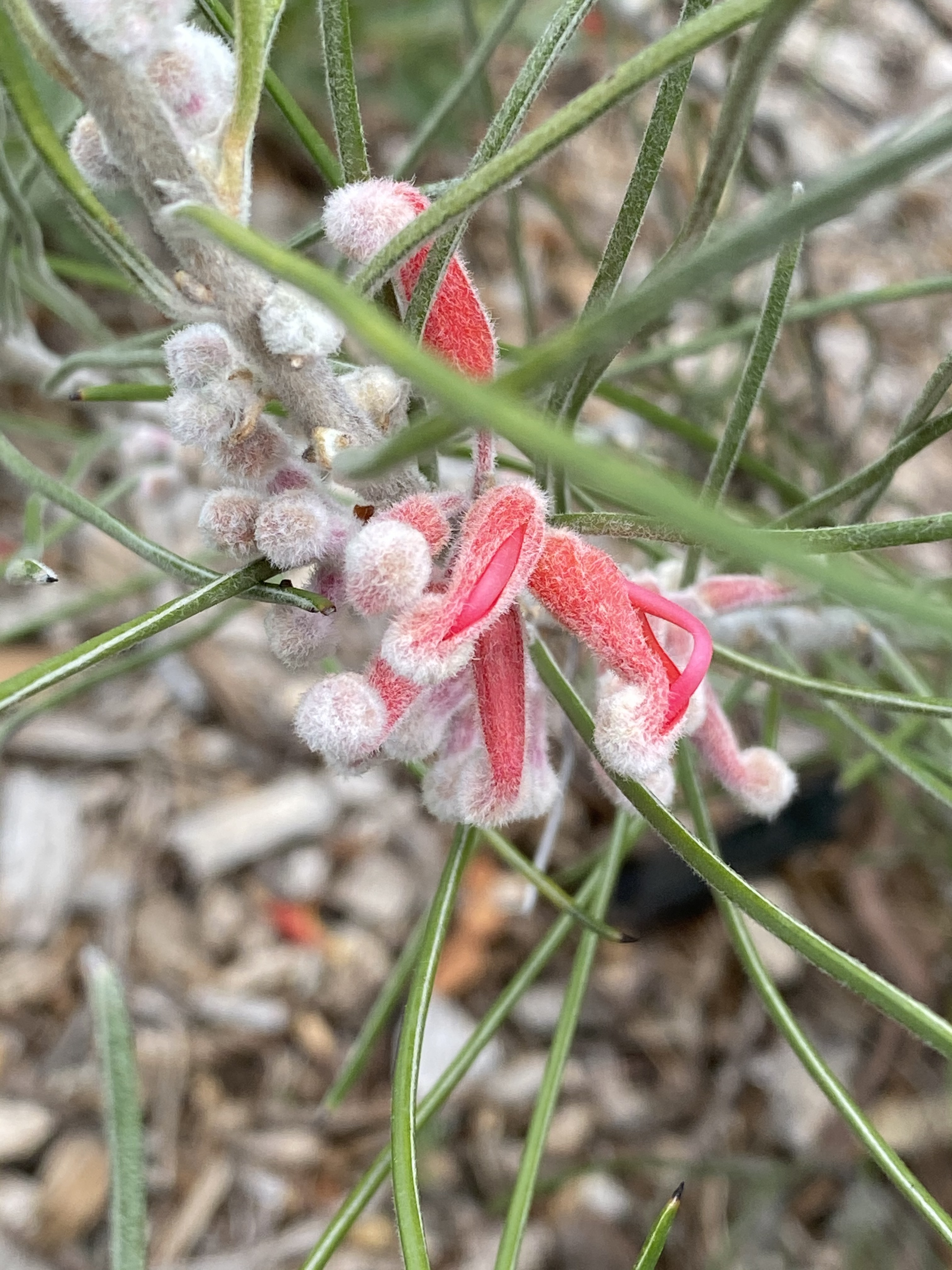

Scientific classification
- Kingdom: Plantae
- Clade: Tracheophytes
- Clade: Angiosperms
- Clade: Eudicots
- Order: Proteales
- Family: Proteaceae
- Genus: Grevillea
- Species: G. pityophylla

Binomial name
- Grevillea pityophylla F.Muell.

Synonyms
- Grevillea blackallii C.A.Gardner

= Grevillea pityophylla =

Species of shrub endemic to Western Australia

Grevillea pityophylla is a species of flowering plant in the family Proteaceae and is endemic to inland areas of Western Australia. It is a dense shrub with linear to more or less cylindrical leaves and hairy, pinkish-red to bright red flowers.

== Description ==
Grevillea pityophylla is a shrub that typically grows to a height of 0.5–1.5 m (1 ft 8 in – 4 ft 11 in) and has many branches. Its leaves are linear to more or less cylindrical, 40–150 mm (1.6–5.9 in) long and 0.9–1.8 mm (0.035–0.071 in) wide. The upper edges of the leaves are rolled under to the mid-vein with two longitudinal grooves either side. The flowers are arranged in groups of up to 3 to 6 in leaf axils, on a shaggy-hairy rachis about 0.5 mm (0.020 in) long and are pinkish-red to bright red and shaggy-hairy, the pistil 18–23 mm (0.71–0.91 in) long. Flowering occurs from July to October and the fruit is an oval to elliptic follicle 11–13.5 mm (0.43–0.53 in) long.

== Taxonomy ==
Grevillea pityophylla was first formally described in 1868 by Ferdinand von Mueller in Fragmenta Phytographiae Australiae from specimens collected by James Drummond. The specific epithet (pityophylla) means "pine tree-leaved".

== Distribution and habitat ==
This grevillea grows in open shrubland on granite outcrops, breakaways andsandplains in between Mullewa, Mount Magnet and Wanarra Station in the Avon Wheatbelt, Murchison and Yalgoo bioregions of inland Western Australia.

== See also ==
- List of Grevillea species
