= William Ayshford Sanford =

English politician

William Ayshford Sanford, DL (1818– 28 October 1902) was a landowner, naturalist and Liberal Party politician, who served as Colonial Secretary of Western Australia from 1852 to 1855.

Sanford was born in 1818, the son of Edward Ayshford Sanford, a Member of Parliament for Somerset, by his first wife Henrietta Langham, daughter of Sir William Langham, 8th Baronet. The family had owned Nynehead Court in Somerset since 1599, and William Ayshford Sanford succeeded to the estate on the death of his father in 1871.

He served as Colonial Secretary from 1852 to 1855, and in this position Sanford asked the assistant Surveyor of the state, Robert Austin, to make observations and collections of birds while exploring inland regions. In the report of the Austin Expedition of 1854 is a note on a "Ground Parrot", following Sanford's labelling of what is assumed to be the type specimen of Pezoporus occidentalis, the cryptic "night parrot". After returning to England, Sanford is noted for his interest in natural history, especially the paleontology of the Somerset area.

As a large landowner, he was a prominent public man in Somerset, was chairman of the Wellington bench of magistrates, and a deputy lieutenant of the county. He had been a strong supporter of the Liberals, but in his late years became a Liberal Unionist.

Sanford died at his residence Nynehead Court, Somerset, on 28 October 1902.

He was twice married, first in 1857 to Sarah Ellen Seymour (d.1867), daughter of Henry Seymour, of Knoyle House, Wiltshire, a male-line descendant of the Seymour baronets; and secondly in 1874 to Sarah Elizabeth Harriet Hervey (d.1877), daughter of Lord Arthur Hervey, Bishop of Bath and Wells, by his wife Patience Singleton. By his first wife, he left children:

- Colonel Edward Charles Ayshford Sanford (1859–1923)
- Mary Ethel Ayshford Sanford (1861–1941), who married her cousin Field Marshal Paul Methuen, 3rd Baron Methuen (1845–1932), and left children
- Henry Seymour John Ayshford Sanford (1863–1934)
- Ellen Henrietta Ayshford Sanford (d.1932), who married Charles Edward Pole-Carew (1853–1938), and left children
- Blanche Clotilde Ayshford Sanford (d.1936)
- Rosalind Ayshford Sanford (d. 1935), who married Sir Sidney Godolphin Alexander Shippard (1837–1902)
