= Acacia ammitia =

Scientific classification
- Kingdom: Plantae
- Clade: Tracheophytes
- Clade: Angiosperms
- Clade: Eudicots
- Clade: Rosids
- Order: Fabales
- Family: Fabaceae
- Subfamily: Caesalpinioideae
- Clade: Mimosoid clade
- Genus: Acacia
- Species: A. ammitia

Binomial name
- Acacia ammitia Pedley

Species of legume

Acacia ammitia is a species of flowering plant in the family Fabaceae and is endemic to Ngarrabullgan in north-east Queensland. It is a spreading shrub or tree with lance-shaped phyllodes and flowers usually borne in two spikes in leaf axils.

== Description ==
Acacia ammitia is a spreading shrub or tree that typically grows to a height of about 5 m (16 ft) and has silvery hairs on its young branchlets. Its phyllodes are lance-shaped, mostly 65–100 mm (2.6–3.9 in) long and 5–9 mm (0.20–0.35 in) wide with a prominent gland at the base. The flowers are borne in usually two spikes 30–40 mm (1.2–1.6 in) long with brown bracteoles that fall off as the flowers open. The pods are narrowly oblong, up to 50 mm (2.0 in) long and 8 mm (0.31 in) wide, leathery and glabrous.

== Taxonomy ==
Acacia ammitia was first formally described in 2019 by Leslie Pedley from specimens collected by Paul Irwin Forster on the southern end of Mount Mulligan. The specific epithet (ammitia) means "characteristic of sandstone", referring to the habitat of this species.

== Distribution and habitat ==
This wattle grows in open woodland with Corymbia leichhardtii, Eucalyptus cullenii and Eucalyptus cloeziana, and is restricted to Ngarrabullgan.

== Conservation status ==
Acacia ammitia is listed as of "least concern" by the Queensland Government Nature Conservation Act 1992.

== See also ==
- List of Acacia species
