= Murrum Station =

Pastoral lease in Western Australia

Coordinates: 28.274°S 117.394°E

Location in Western Australia

Murrum Station, most often referred to as Murrum, is a pastoral lease operating as a sheep station in Western Australia.

The property is situated approximately 50 km (31 mi) south west of Mount Magnet and 70 km (43 mi) east of Yalgoo in the Mid West region of Western Australia. Murrum is adjoined by Yoweragabbie Station.

William Fitzgerald acquired Murrum at some time prior to 1908; he died in 1934 at Murrum. His son, Victor Fitzgerald, was the manager of the property at the time.

== See also ==
- List of ranches and stations
- List of pastoral leases in Western Australia
