= Gidgee Gold Mine =

Gold mine in Western Australia

Gidgee
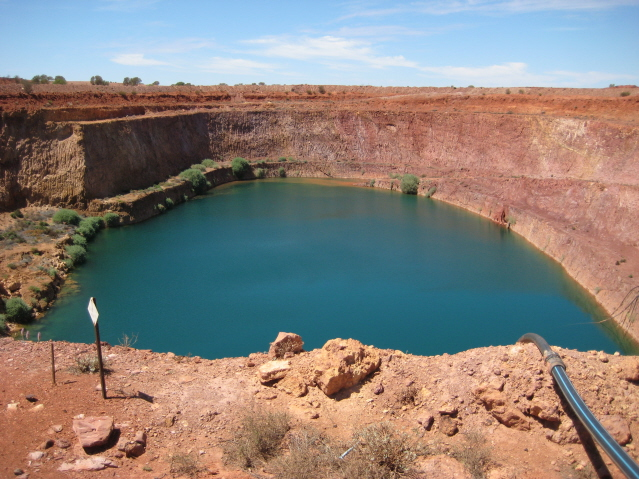
- Kingfisher open pit at Gidgee

- Location in Western Australia
- Interactive map of Gidgee
- Location: Sandstone, Western Australia, Australia; 27°15′10″S 119°24′28″E
- Production: 0
- Financial year: 2020–21
- Opened: 1987
- Closed: 2005
- Company: Horizon Gold
- Website: horizongold.com.au
- Acquired: 2016

The Gidgee Gold Mine is a gold mine in Western Australia, 82 km north of the town of Sandstone. The mine was, until recently, owned by APEX Minerals NL, but purchased by Panoramic Resources in February 2011. The mine is currently in care and maintenance and owned by Horizon Gold, having purchased the mine in 2016.

The mine was scheduled to reopen in late 2008 but delays experienced forced APEX to postpone this date to mid-2010. Gidgee was part of a never implemented three mine production strategy by the company, together with the Wiluna Gold Mine and the Youanmi Gold Mine.

The mine is located in the Gum Creek Greenstone Belt. Its name is derived from the nearby Gidgee Station.

== History ==
Gold mines in the Mid West region

While in operation under Australian Resources Limited, liquidated in October 1999, the company had to close the mine because of financial difficulties. Abelle Limited took over Gidgee in October 1999 and resumed production in February 2000.

Under Abelle, mining was mainly carried out in the South Woodya, Donkey Well and Wahoo open pit and the Swan Bitter underground operation. At the end of 2002, Abelle ceased mining in open pit operations at Gidgee, the only ore now coming from the Swan Bitter underground operation. As a consequence of reduced ore production, milling was reduced to a two weeks on, one week off roster.

In February 2003, Harmony Gold launched a take over offer for Abelle Limited. By the end of April 2003, Harmony had acquired an 85% interest in Abelle and declared the offer closed. The purchase of a controlling interest in Abelle cost Harmony A$155 million and was primarily carried out to acquire Abelle's gold mining projects in Papua New Guinea. The driving forces behind Abelle Limited, Sydney businessmen Peter Cook and Peter Newton, earlier had also sold another gold mining company to Harmony, Hill 50 Gold, for A$233 million in 2002. Abelle was delisted from the Australian Securities Exchange on 2 July 2004, following a compulsory acquisition by Harmony.

Gidgee briefly became part of Harmony's Australian operations, consisting of Gidgee, the South Kalgoorlie Gold Mine, the Big Bell Gold Mine (closed June 2003) and the Hill 50 Gold Mine.

In November 2003, Legend Mining, previously only engaged in silver mining, announced that it had purchased Gidgee for A$6.5 million. At the time, Gidgee had produced over 1 million ounces of gold during its lifetime. Legend took over the mine on 17 December 2003.

Under Legend, production at Gidgee was reduced, the company carrying out extensive exploration efforts but reducing the milling to a two-week on, two week off roster. Legend placed the mine in care and maintenance in March 2005, stating that operating costs in the Western Australian mining industry had risen by 35-45% over the last 15 month while the gold price had remained relatively fixed, making the operation less viable.

In May 2007, legend announced the sale of the mine to APEX Minerals for A$11 million, payable in APEX shares. Additionally, Legend would receive A$5 million once Gidgee had produced in excess of 250,000 ounces of gold and retain certain tenements for Nickel exploration.

APEX's initial plan was to refurbish and enlarge the Gidgee processing plant and use it as a central processing facility for ore from its Youanmi Gold Mine and Gidgee, where it would mine the Wilson deposit. Production was to commence in 18 to 24 months. With the acquisition of the Wiluna Gold Mine in June 2007, Wiluna replaced Gidgee as the location of the central processing facility. Gidgee, like Youanmi, was to serve as a mining location only, with ore from Gidgee to be transported to Wiluna, 130 km north-east of Gidgee.

APEX announced in June 2008, that it would start developing an underground decline from its Wilson 3 pit at Gidgee in October 2008, followed by first ore production in early 2009. The company revised this plan, however and decided to only proceed with the development of the Wiluna mine. It halted all exploration activities at Gidgee and Younami, too. Difficulties encountered in the underground mining and plant commissioning at Wiluna forced APEX to go through a number of capital raisings, the latest in September 2009, when the company raised A$108 million. Consequently, APEX share price fell from a height of A$1.40 in early 2008 to below 4 cents by the end of 2009.

Subsequently, APEX returned to its previously abandoned strategy of sourcing ore from Gidgee as well as Wiluna for its processing facility, planning to commence mining at Gidgee once more in March 2010. In late December 2009, APEX announced a further delay with the development of the Gidgee mine because of the need of an upgrade of the Gidgee - Wiluna road. APEX anticipated that mining could be delayed another two or three months, but, as of the end of July 2010, no further mention of the Gidgee mine being reopened has been made.

In early 2011, the sale of the mine to Panoramic Resources was announced. APEX however retained the rights to the Wilson deposit. Panoramic purchased the mine for A$15.5 million and announced plans to refurbish the production facilities. In May 2012 Panoramic completed the purchase of the Wilsons Gold Project from APEX.

In October 2016, Panoramic Resources spun off Horizon Gold and the Gum Creek Gold Project, including then Gidgee Gold Mine, with Panoramic retaining a 51 percent interest in the new company for a minimum of two years.

== Ownership ==
Previous owners of the Gidgee Gold Mine:

Company	From	To
Australian Resources Limited	?	October 1999
Abelle Limited	October 1999	April 2003
Harmony Gold	April 2003	December 2003
Legend Mining	December 2003	May 2007
APEX Minerals NL	May 2007	February 2011
Panoramic Resources	February 2011	October 2016
Horizon Gold Limited	October 2016	Present

== Production ==
Production of the mine:

Year	Production	Grade	Cost per ounce
2001	67,131 ounces	3.98 g/t	
2002	61,780 ounces		A$415
2003	62,032 ounces		
2004	42,297 ounces	5.68 g/t	A$516
2005	6,860 ounces	6.61 g/t	A$612
2005–present	inactive		

== See also ==
- List of active gold mines in Western Australia
