= Boogardie quarry =

Deposit of orbicular granite located on Boogardie Station

Boogardie quarry is a quarry on Boogardie Station, 35 km from Mount Magnet in the Mid West region of Western Australia, that is a location of a rare deposit of orbicular granite.

== Location ==
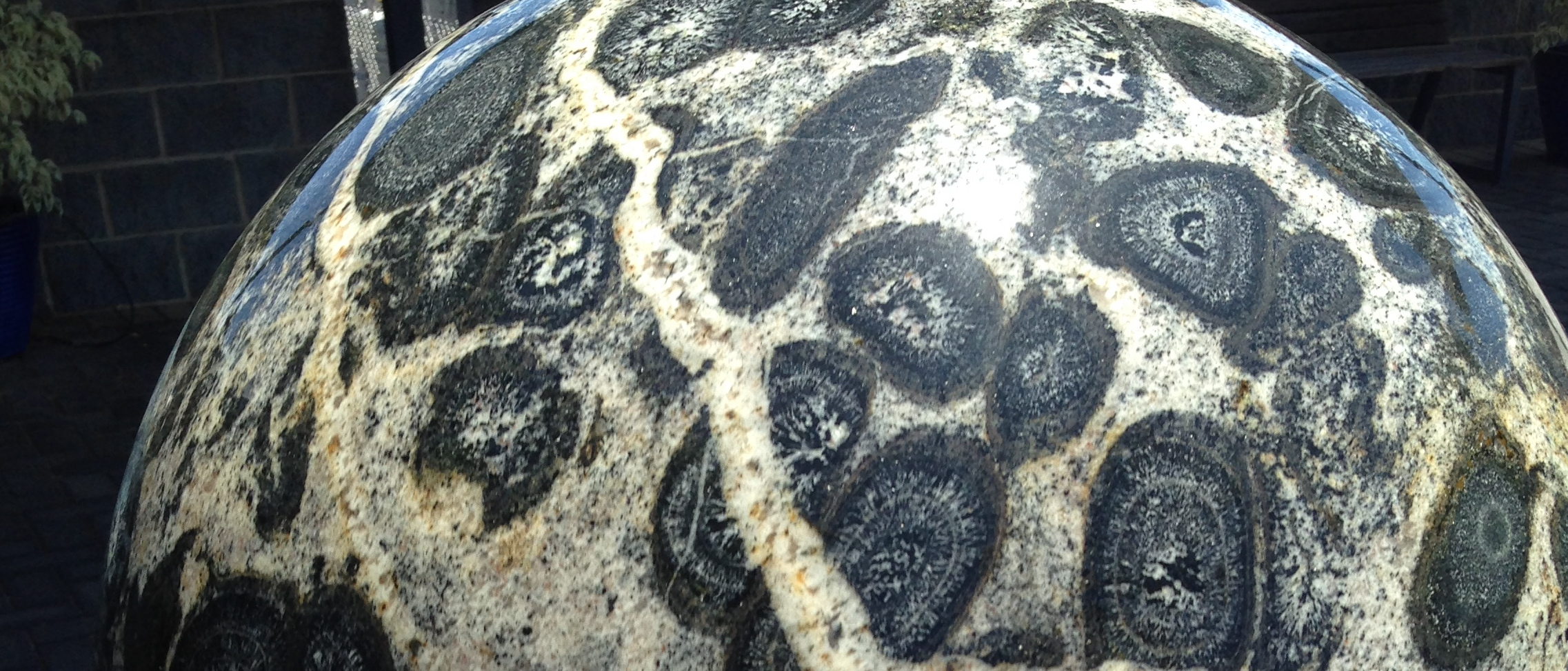
Section of Boogardie orbicular granite used as a Kugel fountain at the W.A. Mines Department core library, Carlisle, Western Australia

The station is the location of a quarry with the incidence of orbicular granite.

The quarry and its contents were a feature item in The Australian geologist newsletter, as "National Rock Garden — Boogardie orbicular granite GSA Rock of the Month — March 2013".

The granite sphere at the Mines Department core library in Carlisle was donated by Mark Creasy in 2004.

Another sphere containing the granite is located in Forrest Place in Perth.
