= Moab Khotsong mine =

Mine in South Africa

- Interactive map of Moab Khotsong mine
- Location: Gauteng, South Africa; 26°58′45″S 26°46′53″E
- Products: Uranium, Gold
- Opened: 1995
- Company: AngloGold Ashanti (1995 – 1 March 2018); Harmony Gold (1 March 2018 – Present)

The Moab Khotsong mine is a large mine located in the northern part of South Africa in North West some 180 kilometers (110 mi) southwest of Johannesburg, South Africa. Moab Khotsong represents one of the largest uranium reserves in South Africa having estimated reserves of 57.2 million tonnes (63.1×10^{6} short tons) of ore grading 0.058% uranium.

During the years 1995 and 1996, Moab Khotsong recorded the worst safety statistics in the mining industry.

== History ==
Harmony Gold successfully acquired Moab Khotsong from AngloGold Ashanti Limited on 1 March 2018. The $300-million deal includes the Moab Khotsong mine, one of the newest South African deep-level mines, with life-of-mine grade forecast at 8.2 grams per tonne (0.26 oz/short ton), taking the average Harmony underground grade to 5.7 grams per tonne (0.18 oz/short ton).

Initially, the mine was named only Moab, which is the name of the original farm on which it has been built and which was commonly believed to mean fertile ground. However, its association with the Biblical Moab prompted workers to request that it be twinned with Khotsong, Sotho for 'peaceful place', and this is now the commonly used classification.
