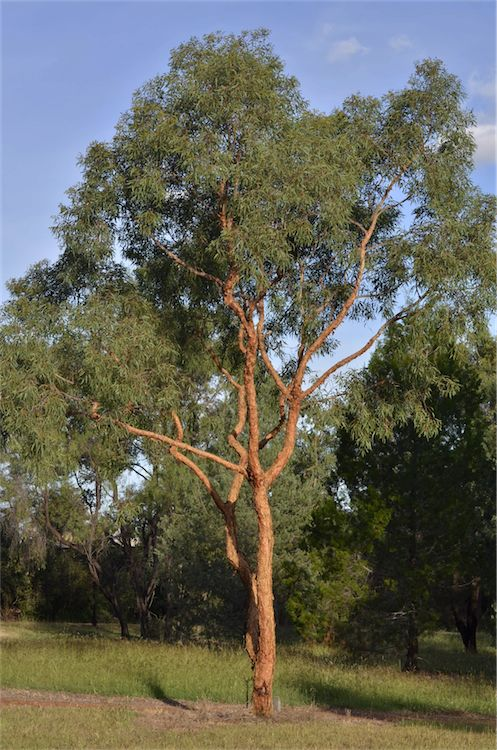
- Corymbia leichhardtii in the Emerald Botanic Gardens

Scientific classification
- Kingdom: Plantae
- Clade: Embryophytes
- Clade: Tracheophytes
- Clade: Spermatophytes
- Clade: Angiosperms
- Clade: Eudicots
- Clade: Rosids
- Order: Myrtales
- Family: Myrtaceae
- Genus: Corymbia
- Species: C. leichhardtii

Binomial name
- Corymbia leichhardtii (Bailey) K.D.Hill & L.A.S.Johnson

Synonyms
- Eucalyptus eximia var. leichhardtii (F.M.Bailey) Ewart; Eucalyptus leichhardtii F.M.Bailey; Eucalyptus peltata subsp. leichhardtii (F.M.Bailey) L.A.S.Johnson & Blaxell

= Corymbia leichhardtii =

Rustyjacket

Species of plant

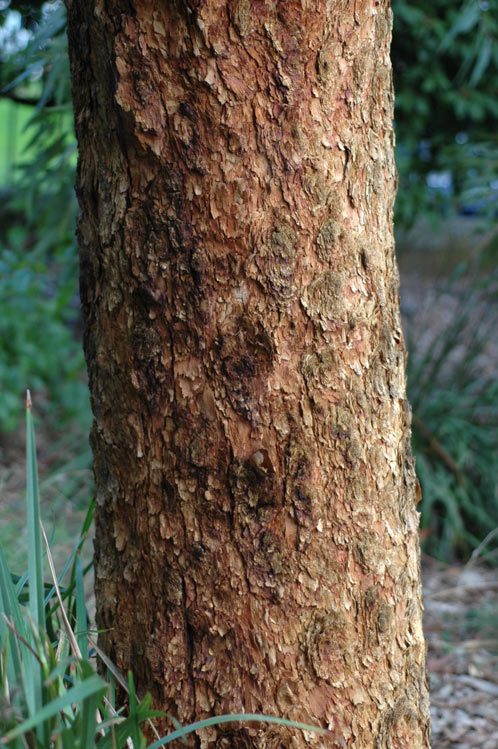
bark

Corymbia leichhardtii, commonly known as rustyjacket, Leichhardt's rustyjacket, or yellow jacket, is a species of tree that is endemic to Queensland. It has rough, tessellated bark on the trunk and branches, lance-shaped or curved adult leaves, flower buds in groups of seven, white flowers and barrel-shaped, urn-shaped or shortened spherical fruit.

== Description ==
Corymbia leichhardtii is a tree that typically grows to a height of 15–18 m (49–59 ft) and forms a lignotuber. It has rough, tessellated, thick, soft, pale brown to yellow-brown or orange on the trunk and branches. Young plants and coppice regrowth have more or less round to egg-shaped or triangular leaves that are 65–165 mm (2.6–6.5 in) long and 25–70 mm (0.98–2.76 in) wide and petiolate. The adult leaves are thin, the same shade of dull, grey-green on both sides, lance-shaped or curved, 105–245 mm (4.1–9.6 in) long and 10–38 mm (0.39–1.50 in) wide on a petiole 10–36 mm (0.39–1.42 in) long. The flower buds are arranged on the ends of branchlets on a branched peduncle 6–25 mm (0.24–0.98 in) long, each branch of the peduncle with seven buds on pedicels about 4 mm (0.16 in) long. Flowering occurs between January and March and the flowers are white. The fruit is a woody barrel-shaped, urn-shaped or shortened spherical capsule 8–15 mm (0.31–0.59 in) long and 7–13 mm (0.28–0.51 in) wide with the valves enclosed in the fruit.

== Taxonomy and naming ==
Rustyjacket was first formally described in 1906 by Frederick Manson Bailey in 1906 in the Queensland Agricultural Journal as Eucalyptus leichhardtii. In 1995, Ken Hill and Lawrie Johnson changed the name to Corymbia leichhardtii. The specific epithet (leichhardtii) honours the explorer Ludwig Leichhardt.

== Distribution and habitat ==
Corymbia leichhardtii has a range stretching from Mareeba in North Queensland south to Salvator Rosa National Park in Central Queensland. It is found in tropical and subtropical sclerophyll woodlands and grows in sandy soils over sandstone.

== Conservation status ==
This eucalypt is classified as of "least concern" under the Queensland Government Nature Conservation Act 1992.

== See also ==
- List of Corymbia species
