= Lennonville, Western Australia =

Abandoned town in Western Australia

Lennonville
- Town
- Interactive map of Lennonville
- Coordinates: 27°58′00″S 117°50′00″E
- Country: Australia
- State: Western Australia
- LGA: Shire of Mount Magnet
- Location: 582 km (362 mi) east of Perth; 13 km (8.1 mi) north of Mount Magnet
- Established: 1896

Government
  - State electorate: North West
  - Federal division: Durack

Population
  - Total: 0 (abandoned)

Lennonville is a derelict town in Western Australia near the town of Mount Magnet, established in 1898.

Lennonville was gazetted in 1896, after gold having been found two years earlier at the location by prospectors Lennon and Palmer.

At the peak of its existence, at the turn of the 20th century, the town had a population of 3,000 and five hotels, outperforming nearby Mount Magnet and Boogardie. By 1909, however, the town was already in decline. After a huge fire swept through the main street of the town a general exodus begun. Today, the most predominant reminder of the towns former glory is the railway platform.
