= Shire of Mount Magnet =

Coordinates: 28°03′36″S 117°50′46″E

- Local government area
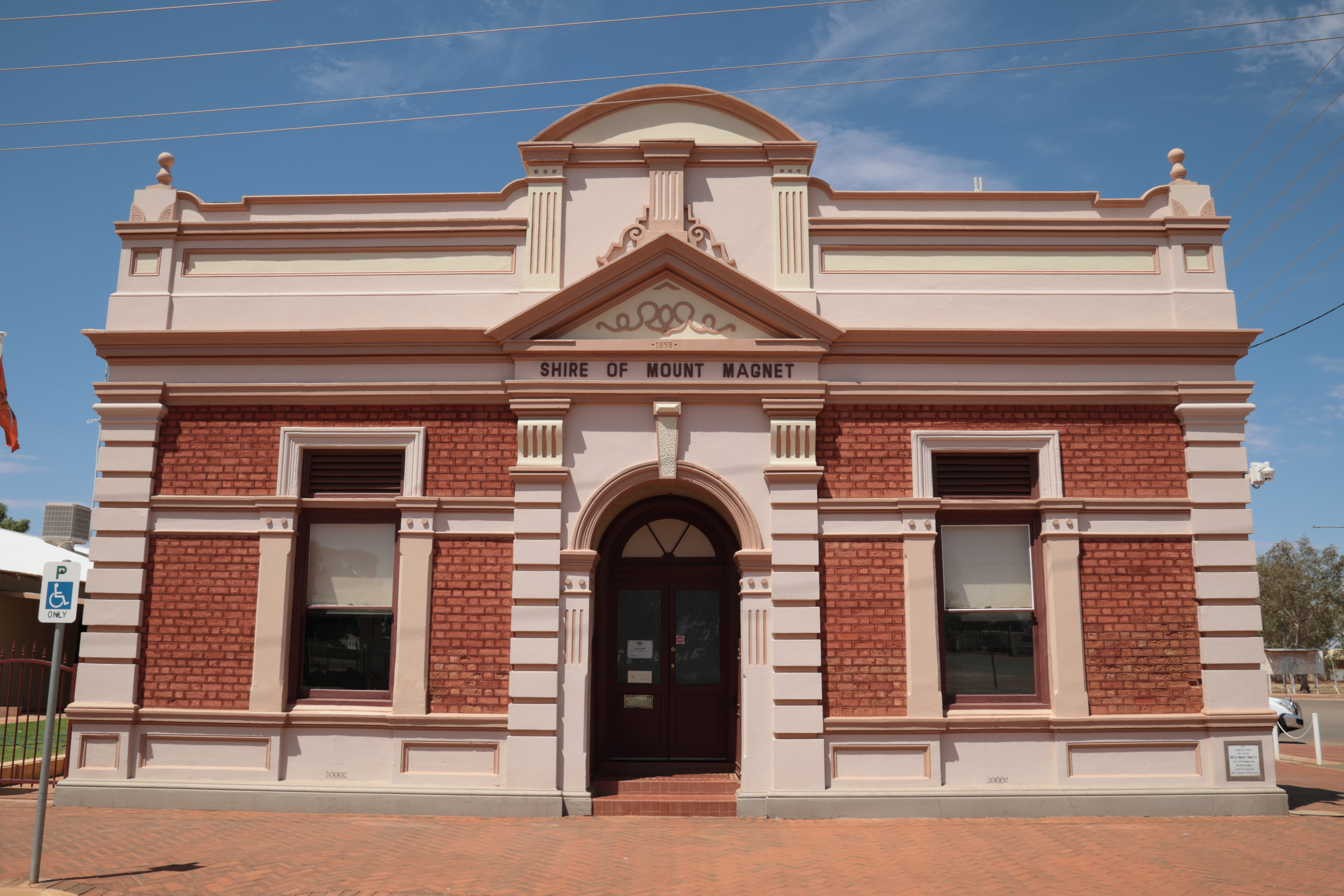
- The Shire of Mount Magnet offices

- Interactive map of Shire of Mount Magnet
- Country: Australia
- State: Western Australia
- Region: Mid West
- Council seat: Mount Magnet

Government
  - Shire President: James (Jim) McGorman
  - State electorate: North West
  - Federal division: Durack

Area
  - Total: 13,691.6 km^{2} (5,286.4 sq mi)

Population
  - Total: 653 (LGA 2021)
- Website: Shire of Mount Magnet
LGAs around Shire of Mount Magnet
Yalgoo	Cue	Sandstone
Yalgoo	Shire of Mount Magnet	Sandstone
Yalgoo	Sandstone	Sandstone

The Shire of Mount Magnet is a local government area in the Mid West region of Western Australia, about 570 kilometres (354 mi) north-northeast of the state capital, Perth. The Shire covers an area of 13,692 square kilometres (5,287 sq mi), and its seat of government is the town of Mount Magnet. The Shire of Mount Magnet current president is James (Jim) McGorman.

== History ==
The Shire of Mount Magnet originated as the Mount Magnet Road District, established on 20 September 1901 covering the area surrounding (but initially not including) the town of Mount Magnet, which had already been incorporated as the Municipality of Mount Magnet in 1896.

The road district absorbed the Mount Magnet municipality on 18 October 1918, and on 1 July 1961, it became a shire following passage of the Local Government Act 1960, which reformed all remaining road districts into shires.

== Wards ==
As of the 2005 elections, the Shire is no longer divided into wards and seven councillors sit at large. Previously, there were two wards - Town Ward (six councillors) and Country Ward (three councillors).

== Towns and localities ==
The towns and localities of the Shire of Mount Magnet with population and size figures based on the most recent Australian census:

Locality	Population	Area	Map
Cooladar Hill	34 (SAL 2021)	5,007.7 km^{2} (1,933.5 sq mi)	
Daggar Hills	32 (SAL 2021)	5,283.6 km^{2} (2,040.0 sq mi)	
Mount Magnet	583 (SAL 2021)	261.2 km^{2} (100.8 sq mi)	
Paynesville	0 (SAL 2021)	3,328.3 km^{2} (1,285.1 sq mi)	

== Former towns ==
- Boogardie
- Lennonville
- Yoweragabbie

== Heritage-listed places ==
As of 2023, 43 places are heritage-listed in the Shire of Mount Magnet, of which four are on the State Register of Heritage Places.
