= Mount Ida Gold Mine =

Gold mine in Western Australia

Mount Ida
- Location in Western Australia
- Interactive map of Mount Ida
- Location: Menzies, Western Australia, Australia; 29°05′54″S 120°27′46″E
- Products: Gold
- Production: 0 (in care and maintenance)
- Financial year: 2020–21
- Opened: 2007
- Closed: 2008
- Company: Red Dirt Metals
- Website: reddirtmetals.com.au
- Acquired: 2021

The Mount Ida Gold Mine is a gold mine located 86 km north-west of Menzies, Western Australia.

Gold was initially encountered on-site in 1895 which led to gold rush and an increase of population in the area.

The mine was formerly owned by Monarch Gold Mining Company Ltd, and went on care and maintenance when Monarch went into administration in June 2008. The mine was subsequently owned by Ora Banda Mining, a successor of Monarch Gold, until sold by the company to Red Dirt Metals in 2021.

== History ==
Gold mines in the Kalgoorlie - Leonora region

Historically, Mount Ida produced over 290,000 ounces of gold from four underground mines, while the nearby Timoni Gold Mine produced 265,298 ounces until it was shut in 1965. All mining ceased in 1988.

The deposit was owned by Hamill Resources, which changed its name to International Gold Fields Limited in July 2003.

International Goldfields commenced mining activities at Mount Ida, dewatering and refurbishing the Timoni shaft and the upper levels of the old mine workings, but mining at Mount Ida was suspended again in February 2005.

After the purchase of the Cape Lambart Iron Ore project in October 2005, the company was renamed Cape Lambart Iron Ore Limited in November 2005. Cape Lambart spun off its gold assets, forming a new International Gold Fields Limited in April 2006.

In August 2006, International Gold Fields announced that it was planning to reopen the mine, but instead sold it in February 2007, when it was purchased by Monarch for A$4 million. Monarch announced a resource of 110,000 ounces of gold at the mine, at an average grade of 24 g/t, making Mount Ida a very high grade mine. Monarch's plan was to transport ore from Mount Ida to its Davyhurst processing facility.

Monarch recommenced mining at Davyhurst in June and at Mount Ida in July 2007, announcing its first gold pour the following month.

Mining at Mount Ida was carried out underground, methods consisting of a small scale rail mounted hand held development and stoping. The mine is accessed via the refurbished Timoni shaft.

The Davyhurst mine was placed in care and maintenance once more on 14 June 2008 because of continued underperformance while the Mount Ida operation remained in production. Michael Kiernan was appointed as managing director of Monarch and resigned as chairman of Territory Resources, the main creditor of Monarch, on 24 June 2008.

Monarch appointed Pitcher Partners as voluntary administrators on 10 July 2008, all mining operations at Mount Ida thereby being put on hold.

In June 2009, Stirling Resources Limited, under managing director Michael Kiernan, announced its intention to inject funds into Monarch Gold. Stirling announced that it would cover all of Monarch's debt, A$55 million, and intended to return both the Mount Ida and the Davyhurst Gold Mine into operation, the latter within three months of the take-over. Mount Ida is scheduled to produce 48,000 ounces of gold per annum at A$450 an ounce, while Davyhurst would produce 65,000 ounces at A$850. Stirling would rename Monarch to Swan Gold Mining Limited. The proposal was accepted by Monarch's creditors on 1 July 2009.

Stirling experienced considerable delays in their fund raising and had to request extensions on the deadline for the recapitalisation of Monarch, first to 31 December 2009 and then to 31 January 2010. The new owners, Swan Gold Mining, announced plans to reopen Davyhurst in May 2010 and Mt Ida in October of the same year.

Swan Gold Mining was renamed to Eastern Goldfields Limited in December 2015 and Ora Banda Mining in June 2019. Eastern Goldfields Limited had to enter voluntary administration in late 2018 after the collapse of a A$75 million recapitalisation plan. A subsequent rescue plan saw the company raise A$22 million in early 2019. It was later reveled that the company was in danger of insolvency as far back as August 2017.

In September 2021, TNT Mines, soon after renamed to Red Dirt Metals, purchased the mine for A$11 million from Ora Banda Mining. Historical production of the acquired mining area was in excess of 300,000 ounces of gold at a grade of above 17 grams per tonne.

== Production ==
Production of the mine:

Quarter	Production	Grade	Cost per ounce
Third quarter 2007	80 ounces	8.0 g/t	
Fourth quarter 2007	338 ounces	8.0 g/t	
First quarter 2008	1,228 ounces	13.2 g/t	
Second quarter 2008			

== See also ==
- List of active gold mines in Western Australia
