= Austin Expedition of 1854 =

Western Australian exploration in 1854

The Austin expedition of 1854 was an expedition of exploration undertaken in Western Australia by Robert Austin in 1854. Members of Austin's party comprised John Hardey, Kenneth Brown, James Tatton Brockman Fraser (artist), Thomas Whitfield, James Guerin, Richard Buck, J. Edwards, W. Cant, Charles Farmer, and J. Woodward; and aboriginals Narryer, Wambinning, Wooddang and Souper.

The expedition left Mumberkine, 23 kilometres (14 mi) north of Northam, on 10 July 1854, exploring the large lakes northeast of Northam known as Cow-Cowing, before heading north through the interior, where Mount Magnet was discovered and named. They intended to reach the coast at Shark Bay, but were driven back by heat, fatigue, lack of water, and the loss of a number of their horses at Poison Rock. They were eventually forced to return to the coast along the Murchison River, arriving at Port Gregory on 25 November.

The expedition reported large areas of land that were potentially gold-bearing, but nothing suitable for pastoral settlement.

Austin was asked by the Colonial Secretary, William Ayshford Sanford, to make observations and collections of birds. Within the report of the expedition is a note on a "Ground Parrot", referring to Sanford's labelling of a bird skin that is assumed to be the type specimen of Pezoporus occidentalis, a cryptic and elusive species known as the night parrot.
