= Boogardie, Western Australia =

Abandoned town in Western Australia

Boogardie
- Town
- Interactive map of Boogardie
- Coordinates: 28°02′00″S 117°47′00″E
- Country: Australia
- State: Western Australia
- LGA: Shire of Mount Magnet
- Location: 7 km (4.3 mi) north east of Mount Magnet
- Established: 1898

Government
  - State electorate: North West
  - Federal division: Durack

Population
  - Total: 0 (abandoned)

Boogardie is an abandoned town in the Mid West region of Western Australia.

== Ghost town ==
The now derelict town in Western Australia, near the town of Mount Magnet, was established in 1898.

Due to its proximity to Mount Magnet and Lennonville some facilities were shared in the time of it being an active mining field. The mining field was incorporated in geological and mining surveys; at the time it was called the Murchison goldfield.

The name has its origins in an Aboriginal word but the meaning is unknown.

== Mining era ==
Boogardie had its own state battery in the early 20th century.

The Sidar and Zion leases of the Hill 50 Gold Mine were located near Boogardie and mined from 1936 onwards, when Hill 50 Gold Mines Ltd started operating the mine.
