= Harmony Gold (mining) =

Gold mining company in South Africa

Harmony Gold Mining Co. Ltd.
- Company type: Public
- Traded as: JSE: HMY
- ISIN: ZAE000015228
- Industry: Gold mining
- Founded: 1950; 76 years ago
- Headquarters: Melrose Arch, Johannesburg, South Africa
- Area served: Worldwide
- Key people: Patrice Motsepe (Chairman); Peter Steenkamp (CEO); Beyers Nel (COO)
- Products: Minerals
- Revenue: R42.65 billion (2022)
- Number of employees: 47,373 (2022)
- Website: harmony.co.za

Harmony Gold is the largest gold mining company in South Africa. Founded in 1950, and headquartered in Johannesburg, the company has operations in South Africa and in Papua New Guinea.

Harmony has nine underground mines, one open-pit mine and several surface operations in South Africa. In Papua New Guinea, the company has Hidden Valley, an open-pit gold and silver mine, and a 50% interest in the Morobe Mining Joint Venture.

== Operations ==
=== South Africa ===
In 2020 Harmony took over AngloGold Ashanti's last South African mining assets for about R4.4 billion.

==== Tshepong ====
Tshepong is located in the Free State Province, near Welkom, about 248 kilometres from Johannesburg. Mining is conducted at a depth of 2 349 meters. The mine uses conventional undercut mining in the Basal Reef while the B Reef is exploited as a high grade secondary reef. Ore mined is processed at the Harmony One plant.

==== Bambanani ====
Bambanani, near Welkom and about 262 kilometres from Johannesburg, has two surface shafts (the East and West shafts). Mining is conducted at a depth of 2 365 metres. Activities at the mine focus on the Basal Reef and are limited to shaft pillar extraction. The ore mined is sent to Harmony One Plant for processing. Given the high risk of seismicity at Bambanani, efforts are focused on managing support systems and the rehabilitation of areas with challenging ground conditions.

==== Target 1 ====
Target 1 is located in the Free State Province, some 10 kilometers north of Welkom and 270 kilometres southwest of Johannesburg. Mining operations at Target 1 comprise one primary underground mine, with a depth of approximately 2 945 metres. While most of the ore extracted comes from mechanised mining (massive mining techniques), conventional stoping is still employed primarily to de-stress areas ahead of mechanised mining. Ore mined is processed at the Target plant.

==== Doornkop ====
Doornkop, a single-shaft operation, is located in the province of Gauteng of South Africa, approximately 30 kilometres west of Johannesburg, on the northern rim of the Witwatersrand Basin. Mining is conducted at a depth of 1 978 metres. The operation focuses on narrow-reef conventional mining of the South Reef. The ore from the operation is processed at the Doornkop plant.

==== Joel ====
Joel is located in the Free State Province and about 292 kilometres from Johannesburg, on the southern edge of the Witwatersrand Basin. The mine comprises two shafts, the North and South shafts. The primary economical reef horizon at Joel is a narrow tabular Beatrix Reef deposit which is accessed via conventional grid development. Mining is conducted at a depth of 1 452 metres. The ore is processed at the Joel plant.

==== Kusasalethu ====
Kusasalethu is located about 90 kilometres from Johannesburg, near the provincial border of Gauteng and North West Province. Kusasalethu is situated in the West Witwatersrand Basin and mines the Ventersdorp Contact Reef as its main ore body. The mine comprises twin vertical and twin sub-vertical shaft systems and uses conventional mining methods in a sequential grid layout. Mining is conducted at a depth of 3 388 metres, making it Harmony's deepest mine. Ore mined is treated at the Kusasalethu plant.

==== Masimong ====
Masimong is located in the Free State Province, near the city of Welkom and about 260 kilometres from Johannesburg. The Masimong complex comprises an operating shaft (5 shaft), and a second shaft (4 shaft), which, although closed for mining, is used for ventilation, pumping and as a second outlet. Masimong exploits the Basal Reef and the B Reef. Mining is conducted at a depth of 2 050 metres. Ore mined is processed at the Harmony One plant.

==== Moab Khotsong ====
Harmony successfully acquired Moab Khotsong from AngloGold Ashanti Limited on 1 March 2018. The $300-million deal includes the Moab Khotsong mine, one of the newest South African deep-level mines, with life-of-mine grade forecast at 8.2 g/t, taking the average Harmony underground grade to 5.7g/t.

The acquisition also includes the Great Noligwa mine which is a high grade opportunity for Harmony to extend the life of mine and extract the shaft pillar.

==== Unisel ====
Unisel is located in the Free State Province, near Virginia and about 271 kilometres from Johannesburg. Mining is conducted at a depth of 2 153 metres below surface. Conventional scattered mining and pillar reclamation takes place to access the Basal, Leader and, to a lesser extent, the Middle reefs. Ore mined is processed at Harmony One plant.

==== Kalgold open pit ====
Kalgold is an open-pit mine situated 55 kilometres southwest of Mahikeng in North West Province and located within the Kraaipan Greenstone Belt. Mining takes place from the A Zone pit. Ore mined from the pit is processed at a carbon-in-leach plant located at Kalgold.

==== Surface Dumps ====
Production from the processing of surface rock dumps situated in the Free State province of South Africa depends entirely on the availability of spare mill capacity at the Harmony One and Target plants, which in turn depends on the availability of underground ore delivered for milling.

==== Phoenix Surface Operations ====
Phoenix, a tailings retreatment operation situated in Virginia in the Free State Province, makes use of the Saaiplaas plant to retreat tailings. During FY13, Harmony finalised an empowerment agreement and transferred 30% of its shareholding in the Phoenix operations to black economic empowerment owners.

=== Papua New Guinea ===
==== Hidden Valley ====
The Hidden Valley mine is an open pit gold and silver mine, situated in the highly prospective area of the Morobe Province in Papua New Guinea, some 210 kilometres northwest of Port Moresby. The major gold and silver deposits of the Morobe goldfield and Hidden Valley are hosted in the Wau Graben. The operational pits are Hidden Valley-Kaveroi and Hamata, located approximately 6 kilometres apart. Ore mined is treated at the Hidden Valley processing plant.

== Illegal miner deaths ==
In late May to early June, 2009, 63 illegal miners died in Free State Province, South Africa mine owned by Harmony Gold.

On Tuesday 26 September 2017, a Tshepong mine employee, Ditsoane, was abducted and held captive, then released and instructed to warn the regional manager of Harmony Gold, Simphiwe Kugeka, to stop harassing and persecuting illegal miners known as zama-zamas in South Africa.

On Thursday 28 September 2017 at around 6pm, the regional manager of Harmony Gold, Simphiwe Kubheka (36) was shot dead at Harmony Mines in Welkom, South Africa. 4 men were sentenced to life for the contract murder of Kubheka in the Kroonstad High Court, 10 October 2019.

== Popular culture ==
In South Africa, Harmony Gold secured a license to sell a replica of the One Ring, made from gold taken from the Bloemfontein mine, the area where The Lord of the Rings author J. R. R. Tolkien was born. Their version of the ring, also inscribed with elvish script, sold in a variety of sizes in various jewellery stores throughout South Africa and directly through their website.

== See also ==
- Gold as an investment
- Largest gold companies
