= Robert Austin (explorer) =

English born Australian explorer

Robert Austin (31 December 1825 – 24 February 1905) was an English-born surveyor and explorer in Western Australia, and a civil engineer and surveyor in Queensland.

== Emigration and career in Western Australia ==
Almost fifteen year old Robert arrived in Australind, Western Australia with his parents and brother James in December 1840. In 1847 he joined the Surveyor-General's Department, where he worked for 13 years. During this time he surveyed the Toodyay-Northam areas, and was included in some exploratory expeditions.

== The Austin expedition ==
He led the Austin expedition of 1854, one of the first European inland explorations of Western Australia with Kenneth Brown. They explored Geraldton, Mount Magnet, and the Murchison River area.

The expedition left Mumberkine, 23 kilometres (14 mi) north of Northam, on 10 July 1854, exploring the large lakes northeast of Northam known as Cow-Cowing, before heading north through the interior, where Mount Magnet was discovered and named. They intended to reach the coast at Shark Bay, but were driven back by heat, fatigue, lack of water, and the loss of a number of their horses at Poison Rock. They were eventually forced to return to the coast along the Murchison River, arriving at Port Gregory on 25 November.

== Career in Queensland ==
Resigning from his position in Western Australia in April 1860, he was appointed to the Queensland Surveyor-General's Department one month later. He was quickly promoted and soon became a Commissioner for Crown Lands.

In May 1862 he was appointed Engineer of Roads for the southern district. After almost 30 years as a civil engineer and surveyor he was appointed, in June 1891, to be Sergeant-at-Arms to the Legislative Assembly, where he served until August 1893.

Among other surveying tasks in Queensland in 1868 he named Gregors Creek (the watercourse) after Andrew Gregor, a pioneer settler who was killed by Aboriginal attackers on 10 October 1846 in the Pine Rivers area.

== Marriage and family ==
On 22 October 1862 he married Sophia Catherine Douglas, with whom he had ten children. His son, Major Colin Douglas Austin, was killed in action on 6 August 1915 in the Dardanelles and was buried at Gallipoli.

== Death and burial ==
He died on 24 February 1905 at Thornborough, Queensland, and was buried in the local cemetery. He was survived by his wife, four daughters and two sons.

== Honours ==
Lake Austin and the town of Austin in Western Australia were named after him.

== See also ==
- Gregors Creek
