= Mount Magnet, Western Australia =

Mount Magnet
- Town
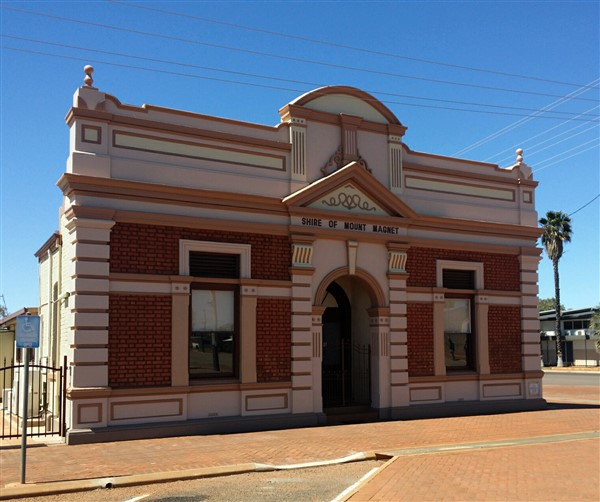
- Mt Magnet Shire Office b.1898

- Coordinates: 28°3′36″S 117°50′46″E
- Country: Australia
- State: Western Australia
- Region: Mid West
- LGA(s): Shire of Mount Magnet
- Location: 573 km (356 mi) NE of Perth; 341 km (212 mi) ENE of Geraldton

Government
  - State electorate(s): North West
  - Federal division(s): Durack

Area
  - Total: 261.2 km^{2} (100.8 sq mi)
- Elevation: 426 m (1,398 ft)

Population
  - Total(s): 576 (UCL 2021)
- Postcode: 6638
- Mean max temp: 28.6 °C (83.5 °F)
- Mean min temp: 15.2 °C (59.4 °F)
- Annual rainfall: 257.5 mm (10.14 in)
- Website: Mount Magnet

Mount Magnet is a town in the Mid West region of Western Australia. It is one of the region's original gold mining towns, and the longest surviving gold mining settlement in the state. The prominent hill that is adjacent to the current townsite was called West Mount Magnet in 1854 by explorer Robert Austin, having named a smaller hill 64 km away, East Mount Magnet (now called Carron Hill). Both hills had an extremely high iron content which affected the readings of his compass. West Mount Magnet had its Aboriginal name reinstated by the Surveyor General in 1972, "Warramboo", meaning campfire camping place. The magnetic variation at Mount Magnet is zero: magnetic north equals true north.

== Overview ==
Surrounding the town are remnants of old gold mining operations, and to the north-east are significant Aboriginal sites being preserved jointly by the local community and the Western Australian Museum. Its history is sustained through the Wirnda Barna Arts Centre, and the Mount Magnet Mining and Pastoral Museum.

The area once had three separate town sites: Mount Magnet, Boogardie, and Lennonville. Hill 50 Gold Mines N.L., which was floated on the Perth Stock Exchange in 1934 to acquire leases at Boogardie, started mining Hill 50 in 1936. Boogardie has since been swallowed up into the open cut mining operations at Hill 50. Lennonville was abandoned at the start of World War I, and the foundations of the bank and train station can still be seen.

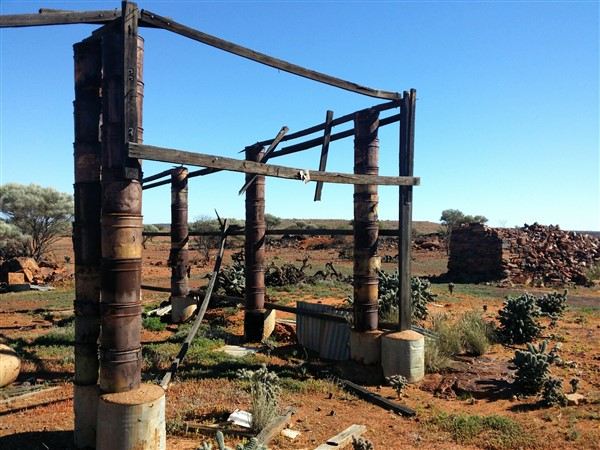
Poverty Flats, Mount Magnet, where alluvial gold was discovered in 1891

There continues to be active gold mining in the area, notably by Ramelius Resources which acquired Mt Magnet Gold Pty Ltd in 2010. The company operates the Saturn and Mars pits, collectively referred to as the Galaxy mining area. The company also commenced the Perseverance open pit cutbacks in 2015 at the top of the Hill 50 underground mine, which is 4 km north west of Mount Magnet.

Unusual for such a large mining community, Mount Magnet never had a public battery (a type of mill machine that crushes material). The nearest battery was built 5 km west in Boogardie. The battery can now be seen at the Mount Magnet Mining and Pastoral Museum. However, evidence of Mount Magnet's gold-rush heyday can be seen in its very wide main street with three hotels and historic buildings.

During the wildflower season (August to November) the Gascoyne-Murchison area attracts tourists viewing the abundant natural display of wildflowers. There are thousands of wildflowers and plant species that can be seen, including the emblematic scarlet red Sturt's desert pea, the royal purple mulla mulla by the roadside, and fields of white, yellow and pink everlastings.

During the lifetime of the Northern Railway to Meekatharra, Mount Magnet was an important railway junction when the Sandstone branch railway was in operation.

Mount Magnet is served by Mount Magnet Airport, where Skippers Aviation has services to and from Meekatharra and Perth.

== Climate ==
The climate in Mount Magnet is an arid climate, also known as a desert climate that has a BWh classification according to the Köppen climate classification. The mean maximum temperature in Mount Magnet is 28.6 °C. The driest months are September to November with average monthly rainfall of 8.93mm. The hottest day recorded in Mount Magnet was 47.4 °C on 21 January 2015.

Climate data for Mount Magnet Aero (1995–present normals and extremes)
Month	Jan	Feb	Mar	Apr	May	Jun	Jul	Aug	Sep	Oct	Nov	Dec	Year
Record high °C (°F)	47.4 (117.3)	46.3 (115.3)	43.3 (109.9)	39.2 (102.6)	35.1 (95.2)	30.7 (87.3)	28.4 (83.1)	33.3 (91.9)	38.3 (100.9)	40.6 (105.1)	45.2 (113.4)	45.4 (113.7)	47.4 (117.3)
Mean daily maximum °C (°F)	38.2 (100.8)	37.0 (98.6)	33.4 (92.1)	28.9 (84.0)	24.0 (75.2)	19.9 (67.8)	19.0 (66.2)	21.5 (70.7)	25.1 (77.2)	29.5 (85.1)	32.9 (91.2)	36.2 (97.2)	28.8 (83.8)
Mean daily minimum °C (°F)	23.7 (74.7)	23.3 (73.9)	20.5 (68.9)	16.3 (61.3)	11.6 (52.9)	8.3 (46.9)	7.1 (44.8)	8.1 (46.6)	10.7 (51.3)	14.5 (58.1)	18.1 (64.6)	21.4 (70.5)	15.3 (59.5)
Record low °C (°F)	12.6 (54.7)	13.5 (56.3)	9.9 (49.8)	5.1 (41.2)	3.3 (37.9)	0.5 (32.9)	−0.2 (31.6)	0.5 (32.9)	3.0 (37.4)	5.3 (41.5)	8.1 (46.6)	11.5 (52.7)	−0.2 (31.6)
Average precipitation mm (inches)	23.5 (0.93)	35.5 (1.40)	35.6 (1.40)	17.4 (0.69)	16.5 (0.65)	21.8 (0.86)	25.3 (1.00)	16.0 (0.63)	10.4 (0.41)	7.2 (0.28)	11.7 (0.46)	17.5 (0.69)	238.0 (9.37)
Average precipitation days	4.1	5.1	5.1	4.6	4.3	6.6	7.8	5.8	4.0	2.9	3.4	3.3	57.0
Average relative humidity (%)	35	41	45	53	57	66	68	60	51	39	36	34	49
Source: Bureau of Meteorology
