= Electoral district of Central Murchison =

Former electoral district in Western Australia

Central Murchison Western Australia—Legislative Assembly
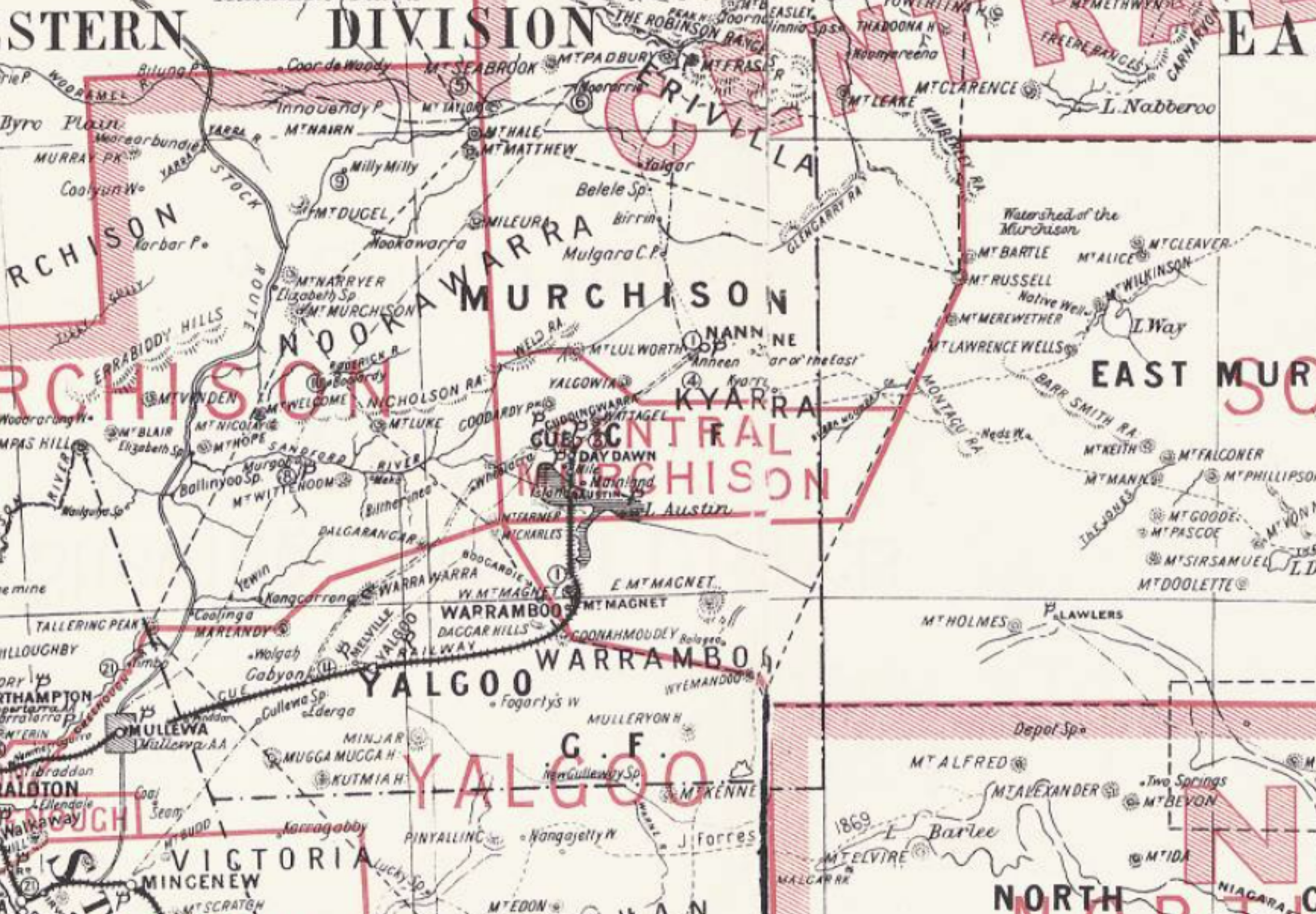
- Central Murchison and surrounds in 1898
- State: Western Australia
- Dates current: 1897–1901
- Namesake: Murchison region

Central Murchison was an electoral district of the Legislative Assembly in the Australian state of Western Australia from 1897 to 1901.

The district was located in the Western Australian outback. It existed for one term of parliament, and was created due to the large temporary population brought to the area by the brief Murchison gold rush. In 1898, it included the towns of Cue, Day Dawn, Cuddingwarra, Austin, and Mainland. Its only member was Frederick Illingworth, a senior Opposition politician. When the district was abolished ahead of the 1901 state election, Illingworth instead won election to the seat of Cue.

== Members for Central Murchison ==
Member	Party	Term
Frederick Illingworth	Opposition	1897–1901
