= Electoral district of Cue =

Former electoral district in Western Australia

Cue Western Australia—Legislative Assembly
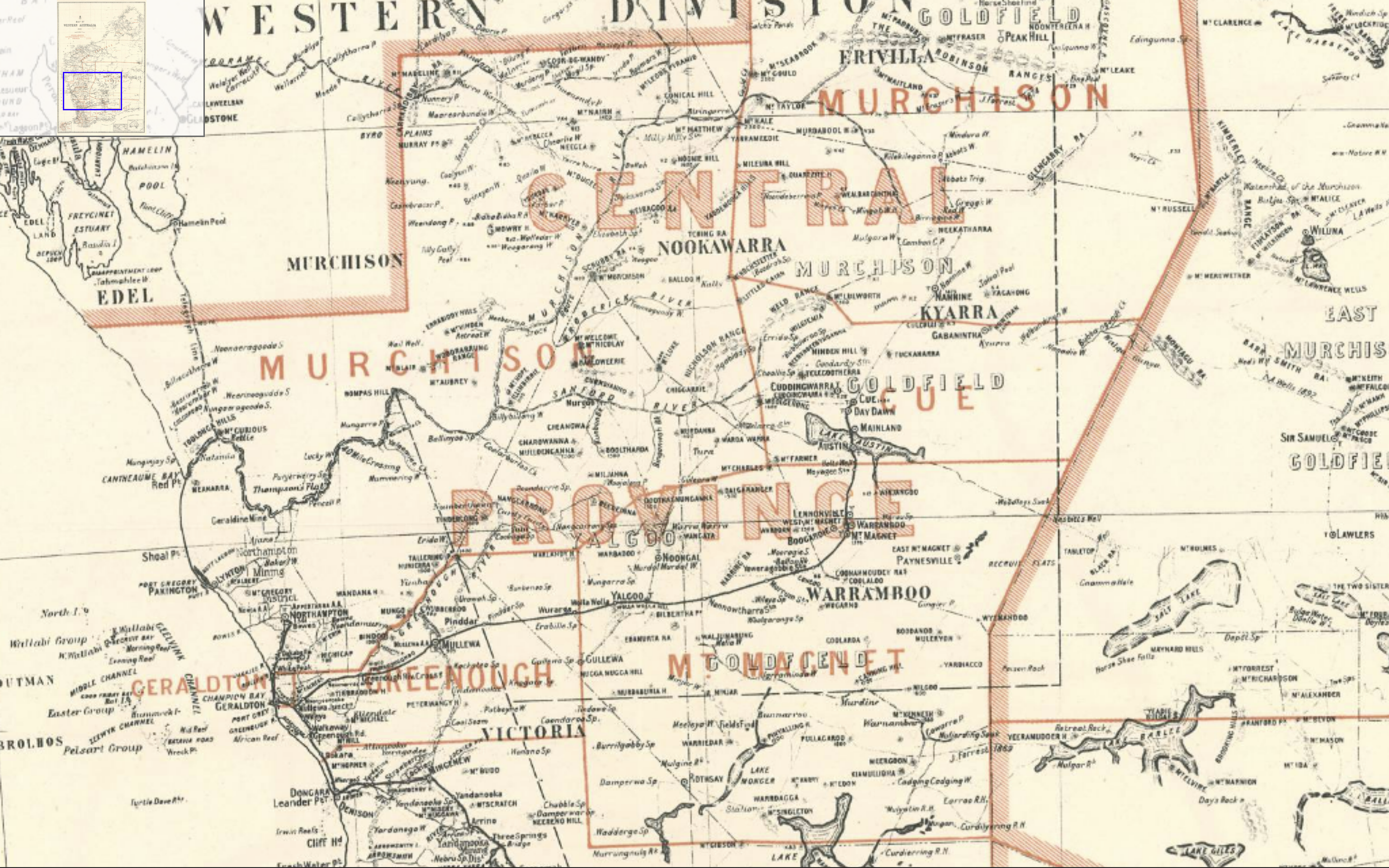
- Cue and surrounds in 1900
- State: Western Australia
- Dates current: 1901–1930
- Namesake: Cue

Cue was an electoral district of the Legislative Assembly in the Australian state of Western Australia from 1901 to 1930.

The district was located in the Western Australian outback. Upon its creation in 1900 it included the towns of Cue, Day Dawn, Mainland, Austin, Cuddingwarra, Gabanintha and Tuckanarra. It was held by the Labor Party for all but the first term of its existence.

== Members for Cue ==
Member	Party	Term
Frederick Illingworth	Opposition	1901–1904
Edward Heitmann	Labor	1904–1913
Thomas Chesson	Labor	1913–1930
