= William Patrick Sr. =

Australian businessman and politician (1845–1936)

The Honourable William Patrick

Member of the Legislative Council of Western Australia
- In office 30 May 1904 – 21 May 1916
- Preceded by: Con O'Brien
- Succeeded by: James Hickey
- Constituency: Central Province

Personal details
- Born: 10 February 1845 Stevenston, Ayrshire, Scotland
- Died: 26 June 1936 (aged 91) Mount Lawley, Western Australia, Australia
- Party: Liberal (to 1914); Country (from 1914)

William Patrick (10 February 1845 – 26 June 1936) was an Australian businessman and politician who was a member of the Legislative Council of Western Australia from 1904 to 1916, representing Central Province.

Patrick was born in Stevenston, Ayrshire, Scotland, to Jean (née Paton) and John Patrick. He was educated in Lochwinnoch and Glasgow, studying law for a period, and then worked in Glasgow's commercial sector. Patrick emigrated to Australia in 1881, setting up as a merchant and auctioneer in Kapunda, South Australia. He came to Western Australia in 1897, during the gold rush, and worked for periods as a storekeeper at Day Dawn and a shopkeeper at Cue (with his brother).

Having previously served on the Cue Municipal Council, Patrick first stood for parliament at the 1901 state election, but was defeated by Frederick Illingworth in the seat of Cue (a Legislative Assembly electorate). In 1904, he was elected to the Legislative Council, defeating Con O'Brien (a sitting member) in Central Province. Patrick was re-elected in 1910, and in 1914 switched from the Liberal Party to the newly formed Country Party. He lost his seat in 1916 to Labor's James Hickey. Patrick died in Perth in 1936, aged 91. He had married Jane Walker in 1873, with whom he had six children. One of his sons, William Patrick Jr., also entered parliament.
