= List of State Register of Heritage Places in the Shire of Cue =

The State Register of Heritage Places is maintained by the Heritage Council of Western Australia. As of 2026, 128 places are heritage-listed in the Shire of Cue, of which 19 are on the State Register of Heritage Places.

== List ==
The Western Australian State Register of Heritage Places, as of 2026, lists the following 19 state registered places within the Shire of Cue:

Place name	Place #	Location	Suburb or town	Co-ordinates	Built	State registered	Notes	Photo
Great Fingall Mine office (former)	627	Day Dawn Townsite	Day Dawn	27°27′34″S 117°51′27″E	1902	7 February 1997	An exceptionally well designed building in the Federation Italianate style, dating from Western Australia's gold boom; Abandoned since 1918	
Old Gaol	628	79 Austin Street	Cue	27°25′17.8″S 117°53′56.7″E	1897	12 December 1997	Former ablution block for Cue Caravan Park; A single-storey Victorian-Georgian style stone building; Associated with multiple murderer "Snowy" Rowles	
Cue Public Buildings	629	Corner Post Office & Austin Street	Cue	27°25′22.7″S 117°53′59.1″E	1895	2 September 1997	Also referred to as Government Buildings; A group of five attached public buildings, including the Police Station & House, Magistrate's Court and Post Office & House; The buildings were designed in the Federation Arts and Crafts style by George Temple-Poole	
Bank of New South Wales (former)	631	64 Austin Street	Cue	27°25′25.8″S 117°53′54.1″E	1900	12 December 1997	Also referred to as West Australian Bank and Western Australian Bank; A single-storey Victorian-Georgian style stone building	
Cue Shire Offices	632	Austin Street	Cue	27°25′22.8″S 117°53′55″E	1895	12 December 1997	Also referred to as The Gentlemen's Club and The Murchison Chambers; A two-storey Victorian-Georgian style stone building, flanked either side by single-storey shops; Associated with the former President of the United States of America, Herbert Hoover	
Murchison Club Hotel	633	66 Austin Street	Cue	27°25′24.5″S 117°53′55.6″E	1896	12 December 1997	Also referred to as Daly's Murchison Club Hotel; A two-storey Victorian-Georgian style building	
Rotunda	636	Austin Street	Cue	27°25′25.3″S 117°53′53.2″E	1904	6 February 1998	Also referred to as the Bandstand; A timber and cast iron Victorian Filigree style octagonal bandstand	
Masonic Lodge (former)	637	55 Dowley Street	Cue	27°25′22.1″S 117°53′41.9″E	1899	9 May 1997	A timber-framed structure clad with corrugated iron in Victorian Second Empire style	
Cue Municipal Chambers (former)	641	33 Robinson Street	Cue	27°25′25.6″S 117°53′45.2″E	1896	17 October 2003	Also referred to as Road Board & Shire Office (former); A stone building in the Federation Free Classical style	
Government School	644	54 Stewart Street	Cue	27°25′15.7″S 117°53′46.5″E	1896	12 July 2002	A government school in the Federation Free style	
Cue Railway Station (former)	3640	Wittenoom Street	Cue	27°25′33.5″S 117°53′58.4″E	1897	20 December 2002	Also referred to as Cue Sporting Complex; A stone building in the Federation Arts and Crafts style; Part of the former Northern Railway, original the terminal station for the Murchison line, later extended to Meekatharra and Wiluna; Now part of the sports complex	
Cue Pensioners Cottages	6516	2 Chesson Street	Cue	27°25′16.8″S 117°53′59.2″E	1958	26 August 2003	Timber-framed structures in the bungalow style	
Bishops Cottage	6540	31 Marshall Street	Cue	27°25′30.7″S 117°53′39.60″E	1904	24 September 2004	Cottage in the Victorian-Georgian style; Built for Bishop William Kelly, first Bishop of the Roman Catholic Diocese of Geraldton	
Former Railway Barracks	17772	Railway Street	Cue	27°25′26.4″S 117°54′10.5″E			Part of Cue Railway Station Precinct (3640)	
Former Railway Master's House	17773	Railway Street	Cue	27°25′35.8″S 117°53′53.9″E	1897		Part of Cue Railway Station Precinct (3640)	
Former Railway Worker's Cottage (1)	17774	Railway Street	Cue	27°25′39″S 117°53′51.7″E	1898		Part of Cue Railway Station Precinct (3640); Site without built features	
Former Railway Worker's Cottage (2)	17775	Railway Street	Cue	27°25′39″S 117°53′51.7″E	1898		Part of Cue Railway Station Precinct (3640); Site without built features	
Railway Ramp and Crane	17776		Cue	27°25′30.3″S 117°54′04.3″E			Part of Cue Railway Station Precinct (3640)	
Little Wilgie Ochre Mine, Cue	25362	Wilgie Mia Road	Cue	26°56′55″S 117°40′37″E		9 May 2022	Kyarra Reserve; Little Wilgie Aboriginal Ochre Site	
