= Electoral results for the district of Central Murchison =

Western Australian district election results

This is a list of electoral results for the Electoral district of Central Murchison in Western Australian colonial elections.

== Members for Central Murchison ==
Member	Party	Term
Frederick Illingworth	Opposition	1897–1901

== Election results ==
=== Elections in the 1890s ===
1897 Western Australian colonial election: Central Murchison
Party	Candidate	Votes	%	±%
Opposition	Frederick Illingworth	182	59.7	
Ministerialist	Joseph Thompson	97	31.8	
Independent	Daniel McIntosh	26	8.5	
Total formal votes		305	97.8	
Informal votes		7	2.2	
Turnout		312	43.6	
Opposition hold		Swing		
