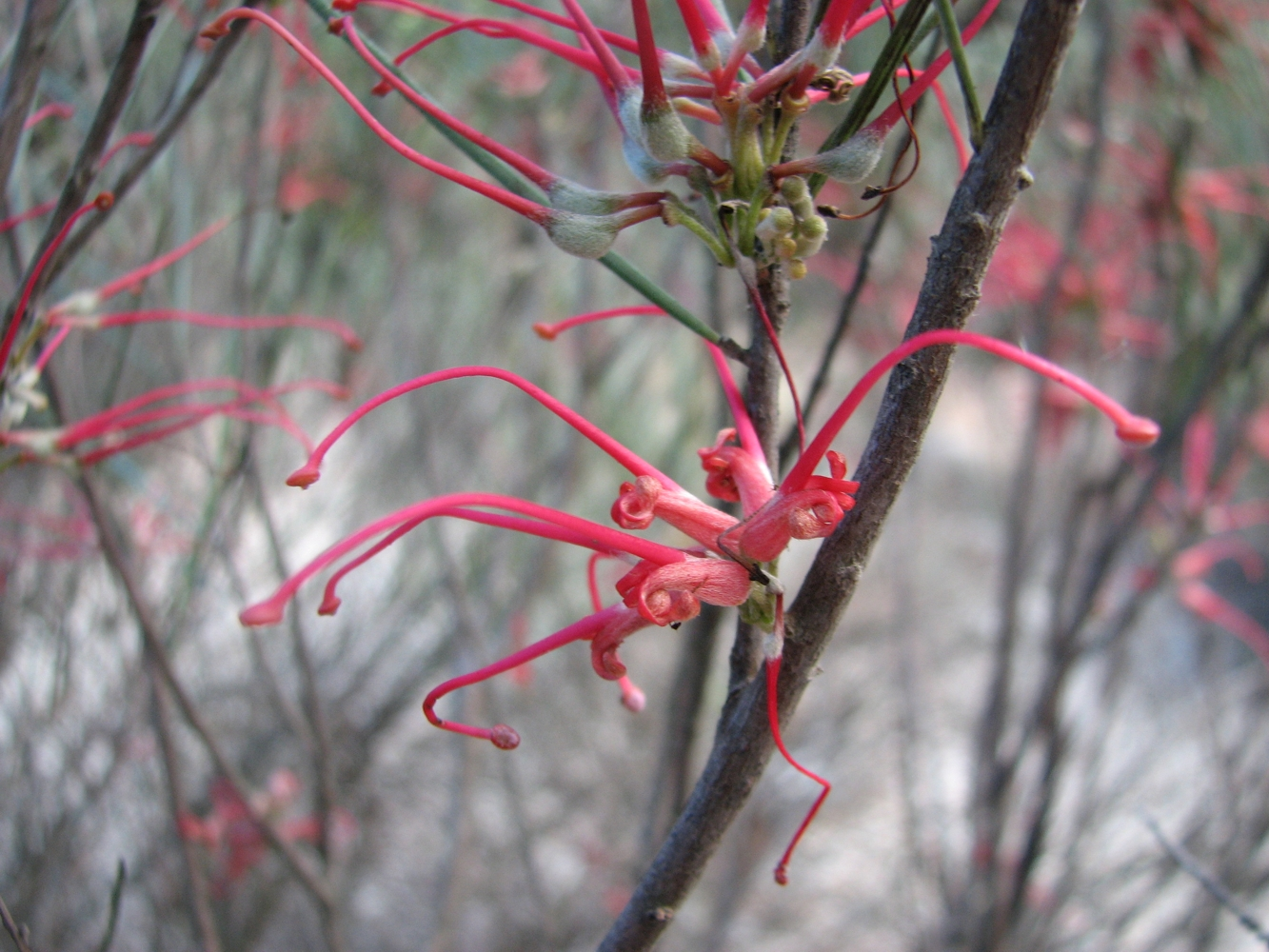
- In Maranoa Gardens

Scientific classification
- Kingdom: Plantae
- Clade: Tracheophytes
- Clade: Angiosperms
- Clade: Eudicots
- Order: Proteales
- Family: Proteaceae
- Genus: Grevillea
- Species: G. sarissa

Binomial name
- Grevillea sarissa S.Moore

= Grevillea sarissa =

Species of shrub endemic to Australia

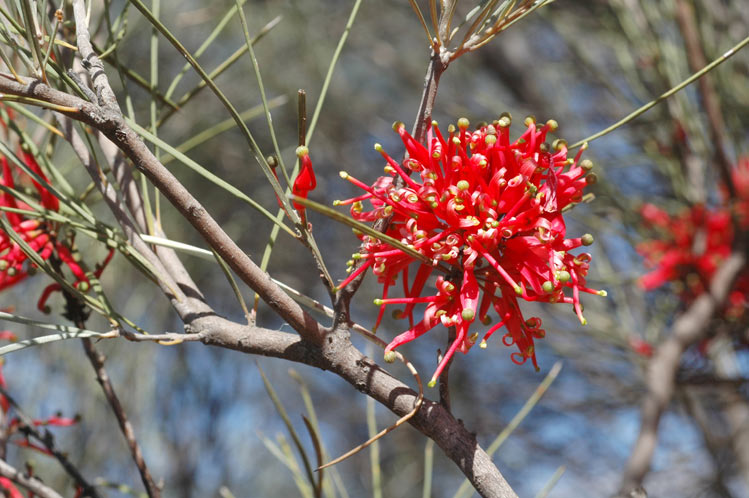
Subsp. sarissa near the Karroun Hill Nature Reserve

Grevillea sarissa, commonly known as wheel grevillea, is a species of flowering plant in the family Proteaceae and is native to South Australia and Western Australia. It is a spreading shrub, usually with linear leaves, and more or less erect, wheel-like to more or less spherical clusters of red or yellow flowers.

== Description ==
Grevillea sarissa is a shrub that typically grows to a height of 0.6–3.5 m (2 ft 0 in – 11 ft 6 in). Its leaves are usually linear, 15–150 mm (0.59–5.91 in) long and 0.9–2 mm (0.035–0.079 in) wide, or rarely, divided with 2 or 3 linear lobes 10–50 mm (0.39–1.97 in) long. The edges of the leaves are rolled under, obscuring the lower surface, apart from the midvein. The flowers are arranged on the ends of branches, in leaf axils, or often on the stems, in more or less erect, wheel-like to more or less spherical clusters on a rachis 2.5–8 mm (0.098–0.315 in) long with bracts 0.3–1.2 mm (0.012–0.047 in) long at the base. Flower colour varies with subspecies, the pistil 20–30 mm (0.79–1.18 in) long. Flowering time varies with subspecies and the fruit is an elliptic follicle 12–20 mm (0.47–0.79 in) long.

== Taxonomy ==
Grevillea sarissa was first formally described in 1899 by Spencer Le Marchant Moore, his description published in Journal of the Linnean Society, Botany.

In 1986, Donald McGillivray describe six subspecies of G. sarissa in his book New Names in Grevillea (Proteaceae) and the names are accepted by the Australian Plant Census:

- Grevillea sarissa subsp. anfractifolia McGill. has dull red and cream-coloured flowers with a dark red, green-tipped style, from September to November.
- Grevillea sarissa subsp. bicolor McGill. has dull pinkish red and pale yellowish cream flowers with a red or yellowish cream, green- to yellow-tipped style, in March and October.
- Grevillea sarissa subsp. rectitepala McGill. has red and cream-coloured flowers with a red, pale green-tipped style, from September to December.

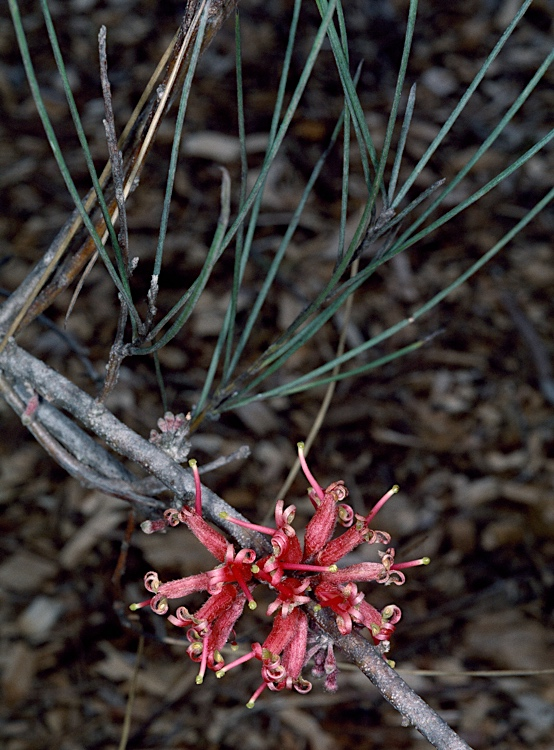
Subsp. rectitepala in the Australian Botanic Garden Mount Annan

- Grevillea sarissa S.Moore subsp. sarissa has red and cream-coloured flowers with a red, pale green-tipped style, from September to December.
- Grevillea sarissa subsp. succincta McGill. has red to deep pink and white, sometimes pale cream-coloured flowers with a similarly coloured style, from August to November.
- Grevillea sarissa subsp. umbellifera McGill. has dull, pinkish red and white or pale cream-coloured flowers with a red, green-tipped style, from September to January.

== Distribution and habitat ==
Subspecies anfractifolia grows in mallee woodland or shrubland, often near salt lakes, and is found between Norseman, Balladonia Coolgardie and Queen Victoria Spring in the Coolgardie, Great Victoria Desert, Mallee, Murchison and Nullarbor bioregions of inland Western Australia.

Subspecies bicolor grows in shrubland on sand dunes between Cue, Lake Austin and Wiluna in the Coolgardie, Great Victoria Desert and Murchison bioregions.

Subspecies rectitepala grows in open mallee or shrubland, and is only known from a few collections between Comet Vale and Cundeelee in the Coolgardie, Great Victoria Desert and Murchison bioregions.

Subspecies sarissa is mainly found in open shrubland, often on dunes near salt lakes, and is widespread between Jibberding, Mount Magnet, Lake Seabrook, Laverton and Queen Victoria Spring, in the Avon Wheatbelt, Coolgardie, Great Victoria Desert, Murchison and Yalgoo bioregions of south-western Western Australia.

Subspecies succincta mainly grows in chenopod shrubland, often near clay pans or salt lakes, and is restricted to the area around Wiluna in the Gascoyne and Murchison bioregions.

Subspecies umbellifera grows in shrubland, often near salt lakes, and is found between Koonibba and Karcultaby on the Eyre Peninsula of South Australia.

== Conservation status ==
All five subspecies of G. sarissa found in Western Australia are listed as "not threatened" by the Western Australian Government Department of Biodiversity, Conservation and Attractions.

== See also ==
- List of Grevillea species
