= Harry Marshall (politician) =

Politician and publican in Western Australia

Member of the Western Australian Legislative Council
- In office 16 July 1894 – 5 January 1895
- Preceded by: New seat
- Succeeded by: Alfred Kidson
- Constituency: West Province

Personal details
- Born: c. 1862 Western Australia
- Died: 28 December 1909 (aged 47) Day Dawn, Western Australia
- Resting place: Cue Cemetery
- Spouse(s): Clara Wilhelmina Ohlmeyer (m. 1886; died 1891) Jane Ann McLean (m. 1892)
- Children: 6
- Occupation: Publican; merchant

Thomas Henry Marshall (Note: Birthname probably listed as "Henry James Marshall".) (c. 1862 – 28 December 1909) was an Australian politician, publican and merchant who served as a member of the Western Australian Legislative Council from 1894 to 1895.

== Biography ==
Marshall was born in Western Australia, with his precise birthplace having been listed as Baylup, Toodyay or Fremantle. He was the son of Louisa Harris or Tulk and Edward Marshall, a convict who originally arrived in Western Australia aboard Ramillies in 1854.

Marshall served as a councillor for the Western Australian towns of Fremantle (resigned in 1895) and Cue (from 1906). He served in the Western Australian Legislative Council as the third member for West Province from 1894 to 1895.

In his final years, Marshall operated as licensee of the Great Fingall and Day Dawn hotels. On 28 December 1909, he died in Day Dawn, aged 47, due to gastroenteritis. He was buried at Cue Cemetery.
