= Reedy, Western Australia =

Reedy
- Town
- Coordinates: 27°07′20″S 118°16′52″E
- Country: Australia
- State: Western Australia
- LGA(s): Shire of Cue
- Location: 721 km (448 mi) NNE of Perth; 50 km (31 mi) ENE of Cue
- Established: 1934

Government
  - State electorate(s): North West
  - Federal division(s): Durack

Area
  - Total: 3,477 km^{2} (1,342 sq mi)
- Elevation: 490 m (1,610 ft)

Population
  - Total(s): 4 (SAL 2021)
- Postcode: 6640

Reedy is an abandoned town in the Murchison region of Western Australia. The town is located between Cue and Meekatharra in the Mid West region of Western Australia.

Gold was discovered in the area by H. Reed in 1899–1900 and a nearby well, Reedy's Well, was named after him. The well appeared on maps of the area in 1908 as a known water source. Further gold discoveries were made in the 1930s and several mines were developed. By 1933 the Cue-Day Dawn road board petitioned for a townsite to be surveyed and declared. Suggestions for the name of the town included Triton, Mathers and Reedy. The town was gazetted in 1934.
