= Electoral results for the district of Nannine =

Western Australian district election results

This is a list of electoral results for the Electoral district of Nannine in Western Australian colonial elections.

== Members for Nannine ==
Member	Party	Term
Frederick Illingworth	Opposition	1894–1897

== Election results ==
=== Elections in the 1890s ===
1894 Western Australian colonial election: Nannine
Party	Candidate	Votes	%	±%
None	Frederick Illingworth	152	71.4	n/a
None	Leonard Darlot	61	28.6	n/a
