= Municipality of Cue =

Municipality in Western Australia

The Municipality of Cue was a local government area in Western Australia centred on town of Cue.

The municipality was established on 30 May 1894. The first elections were held on 16 August 1894, with W. Hepburn Gale becoming the council's first chairman. The municipal council first met in the Cue Warden's Court on 24 September 1894.

In 1896, the municipality constructed the Cue Municipal Chambers to serve as their new headquarters. The state-heritage listed building was used by the municipality's successor institutions until 1980 and is now used as corporate offices.

The municipality's boundaries were expanded on 6 July 1904.

It ceased to exist on 11 October 1912, when along with the nearby Municipality of Day Dawn, it merged into the surrounding Cue Road District, which was in turn renamed the Cue-Day Dawn Road District. The Cue council supported the amalgamation.

Politicians Harry Marshall, Con O'Brien and William Patrick Sr. served on the council.
