= Karbar Station =

Pastoral lease in Western Australia

Coordinates: 27.091°S 118.007°E

Location in Western Australia

Karbar or Karbar Station is a pastoral lease that currently operates as a cattle station and has previously operated as a sheep station.

It is located about 38 kilometres (24 mi) north of Cue and 73 kilometres (45 mi) south west of Meekatharra in the Mid West region of Western Australia. The old townsite of Tuckanarra is situated within the station boundaries. The property occupies an area of 124,075 hectares (306,596 acres), with frontage along the Great Northern Highway and the Jungar River and its tributaries.

The property has numerous wells and bores at a shallow depth and the creek systems provide extensive floodout country that supports mulga shrubland and perennial grasses such as buffel. The maximum carrying capacity is approximately 8,050 sheep.

The homestead, which is the old Tuckanarra hotel, and shearers' quarters have been upgraded and offer tourist accommodation. The homestead has 15 rooms in total, including five bedrooms.

The station was established at some time prior to 1899 when it was placed on the market along with New Forrest Station. Together the leases occupied an area of 304,000 acres (123,024 ha) and were carrying 3,200 sheep, 100 cattle and 40 horses. Improvements at the property included a six-room homestead, a woolshed, yards and fencing.

Ben Copley acquired the property in 1918. By 1920 Copley, who also owned Mount Barnett Station in the Kimberley region, would overland cattle from Mount Barnett the 1,000 miles (1,609 km) to Karbar for agistment before sending them to market.

James Hicks acquired the property in 1923 and had started running sheep and producing wool. Hicks died in 1944; the property was initially to be sold by the executors of Hicks' will but this was refused by the Supreme Court and Karbar was left to the Hicks' three children. The Hicks family still owned the property in 1952 and the property was still producing high quality wool attracting top prices. The Snell family acquired Karbar shortly afterwards.

The company headed by Dallas Dempster, Hyperion Energy, had purchased Karbar in January 2011 with the intention of building a 1,000-metre (3,281 ft) tall solar updraft tower on the property at an estimated cost of A$1.6 billion.

Since acquiring Karbar the company has started to convert the property infrastructure to run cattle.

== See also ==
- List of ranches and stations
