= Australian Venue Co. =

Australian hospitality company

- Formerly: Dixon Hospitality Group
- Company type: Private
- Industry: Retail; Hospitality; Entertainment
- Headquarters: Melbourne, Australia
- Area served: Australia
- Key people: Paul Waterson (CEO)
- Services: Nightclubs; Pubs; Restaurants
- Number of employees: 8,000
- Parent: PAG
- Subsidiaries: Court Hotel; Duke of Wellington Hotel; Esplanade Hotel; Regatta Hotel
- Website: Official website

Australian Venue Co. (AVC), formerly Dixon Hospitality Group, is a hospitality company in Australia that owns and operates over 200 venues across the country.

== History ==
in 2017, KKR purchased an 80% stake in the Dixon Hospitality Group. The company's portfolio initially consisted of five venues in Melbourne, but has expanded to over 200 venues across Australia and New Zealand.

In March 2019, Coles Group and Australian Venue Co. established a joint venture (Queensland Venue Co) where AVC would take over operations of the Coles' Spirit Hotels and receive its profits while Coles would run the group's liquor stores and receive its profits. Coles received $200 million from AVC as part of the deal.

In August 2023, PAG agreed terms to purchase KKR's controlling shareholding for $1.4 billion.

In December 2024, the company announced a ban on Australia Day celebrations in 2025 due to the holiday causing "sadness for some members of our community". The decision was subsequently reversed following public criticism.

== Venues ==
AVC's venues are spread across various locations in Australia, ranging from coastal towns to major cities. The company's portfolio includes bars, restaurants, pubs, nightclubs, and function spaces that cater to different clientele. Some of the notable venues are:

- Court Hotel, Perth
- Duke of Wellington Hotel
- Esplanade Hotel
- Regatta Hotel

== Headquarters and staffing ==
AVC's Head Office is located at Level 16, 242 Exhibition Street, Melbourne VIC 3000. AVC has over 8,300 employees across Australia & New Zealand.
