= Mainland, Western Australia =

Mainland
- Town
- Interactive map of Mainland
- Coordinates: 27.583°S 117.916°E
- Country: Australia
- State: Western Australia
- LGA: Shire of Cue
- Location: 635 km (395 mi) NNE of Perth; 15 km (9.3 mi) S of Cue
- Established: 1898

Government
  - State electorate: North West
  - Federal division: Durack
- Elevation: 418 m (1,371 ft)
- Postcode: 6640

Mainland is an abandoned town in the Mid West region of Western Australia. The town is located between Cue and Austin.

Gold was discovered in the area in 1892 and was initially known as Mainland since it was located on the northern shore of Lake Austin so the name distinguished it from its neighbouring town of Austin which was also known as The Island. The town was gazetted in 1898.
