= Cue Airport =

Airport in Western Australia

- IATA: CUY; ICAO: YCUE

Summary
- Airport type: Public
- Operator: Cue Shire Council
- Location: Cue, Western Australia
- Elevation AMSL: 1,450 ft / 442 m
- Coordinates: 27°26′54″S 117°55′12″E

Map
- Location in Western Australia

Runways
Direction	Length		Surface
Direction	m	ft	Surface
04/22
11/29
- Sources: AIP

Cue Airport (IATA: CUY, ICAO: YCUE) is located 2 nautical miles (3.7 km; 2.3 mi) southeast of Cue, Western Australia.

== Airlines and destinations ==
Airlines	Destinations
National Jet Express	Charter: Perth

== See also ==
- List of airports in Western Australia
- Aviation transport in Australia
