= Connections Nightclub =

Nightclub in Northbridge, Western Australia

Connections
- Connies
- Interactive map of Connections
- Full name: Connections Nightclub
- Address: 81 James Street, Northbridge; Australia
- Coordinates: 31°56′56″S 115°51′30″E
- Type: Nightclub

Construction
- Opened: 11 December 1975; 50 years ago

Connections, known colloquially as Connies, is a nightclub in the Northbridge suburb of Perth, Western Australia. It opened in 1975, and is believed to be the longest-running gay club in the southern hemisphere.

The club is on the City of Perth heritage register for its significance to the LGBTQIA+ community in Western Australia.

== Description ==
Connections has been described as having "played a pivotal role in the evolution of Perth's gay community." The venue regularly hosts DJ nights, cabaret shows, and drag shows. It features a main dance floor, a rooftop terrace, and an upstairs lounge.

Celebrities who have partied and performed at the club include Boy George, Elton John, Rod Stewart and Mel Gibson. DJs Frankie Knuckles and Tama Sumo have performed at the club.

== History and operations ==
Prior to Connections, the building served as a cabaret bar and illegal gambling den. Denis Marshall and Walter Furlong opened Connections upon the suggestion of one of their gay friends. The club opened on 13 December 1975.

The venue originally served as an underground venue where illegal relationships were shielded from public view. Cameras were banned inside Connections "for its first 14 years", necessary in part because of Western Australia's ban on homosexual relationships until 1990.

The venue caught fire in 1981. According to legend, the DJ on the night queued the track "Disco Inferno" before the evacuation. Patrons of the venue danced and cheered on the firefighters from nearby Lake Street.

Tim Brown took ownership of the club in 1991.

== Reception ==
The venue has been described by local media as "Perth's premier LGBT+ nightlife destination". An ABC profile of the venue in 2015 described it as iconic.

== See also ==
- Court Hotel
- List of LGBTQ bars
