= Great Fingall Mine office =

Heritage-listed building in Day Dawn, Western Australia

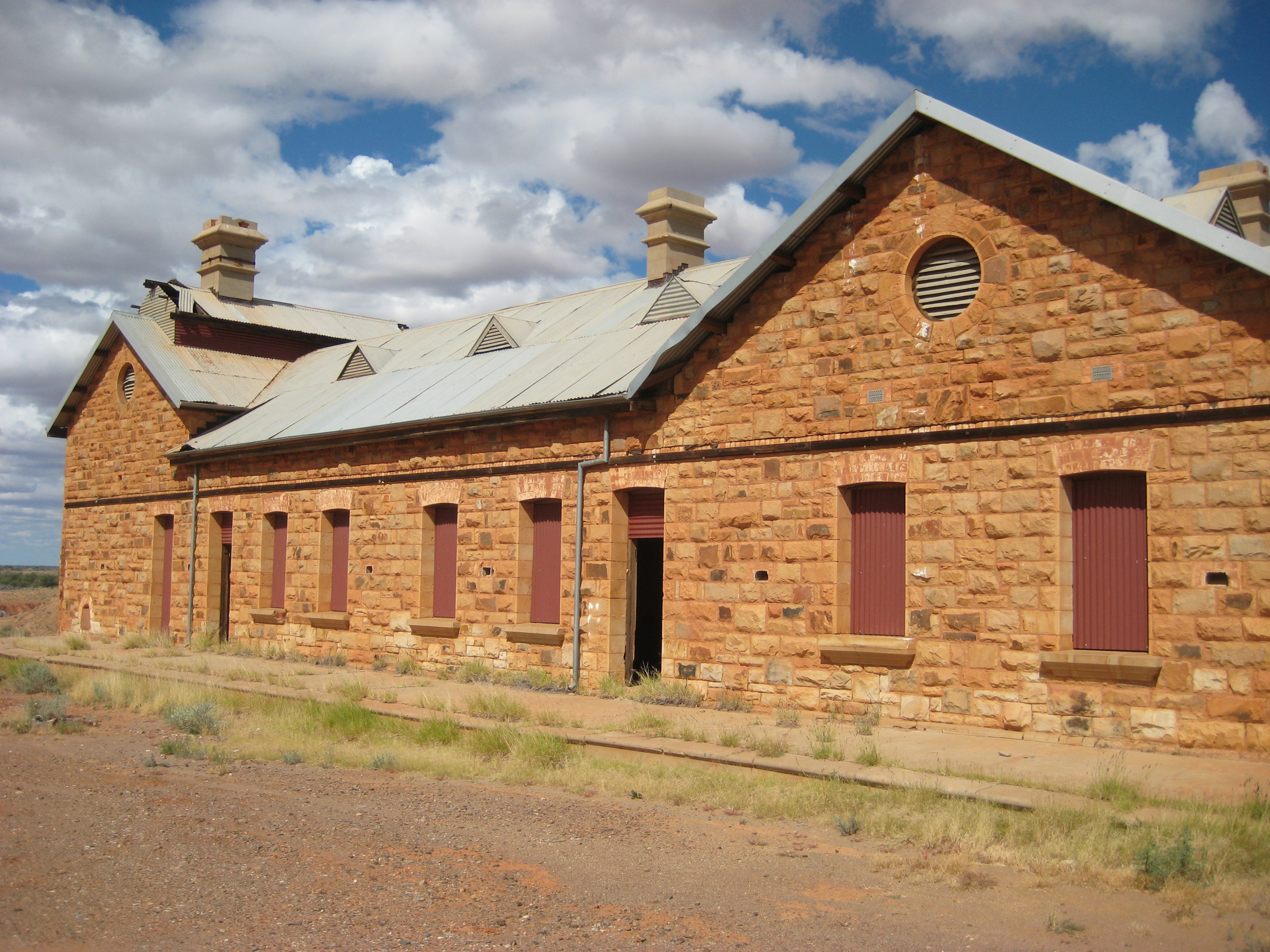
- Great Fingall Mine office in 2011

- Location within Western Australia
- Interactive map of the Great Fingall Mine office area

General information
- Type: Mine office
- Location: Day Dawn, Western Australia
- Coordinates: 27°27′34″S 117°51′27″E

Western Australia Heritage Register
- Designated: 7 February 1997
- Reference no.: 627

The Great Fingall Mine office is a heritage listed building in Day Dawn (near Cue), within Western Australia's Goldfields. It was built from stone in the Federation Italianate architectural style, during the Western Australian gold rushes, c. 1902. The single-storey structure was used as the administrative and assay offices for the Great Fingall Consolidated Gold Mining Company.

The mine office, and eventually the entire town of Day Dawn, were abandoned following the closure in 1918 of the adjacent Great Fingall Mine and the outbreak of World War One.

The mine office has significant heritage value as the only substantial building left in Day Dawn, and as a rare example of co-located administrative and assay offices. The condition has declined due to decades without any use, but remains generally sound, with the only alterations being the removal of verandahs, deterioration related to exposure to weather, and vandalism.

The Great Fingall Mine reopened in the mid-1990s. There were initially concerns about the mining operation causing further deterioration to the historic building, due to flyrock from blasting, or of a wall collapse due to the closeness of the open cut pit, but by 1997 the threat was assessed as having passed. By 2020, the growth of the mine to within 10 metres (33 ft) of the building was endangering it – the gradual erosion of the edge could cause the mining office to slip into the mine.

Since c. 2000, the Shire of Cue has been looking at relocating the heritage building to the town of Cue, where it could be restored, and opened to the public, but the $3 million cost is beyond the capacity of the shire, which as of January 2020 was hoping for assistance from the state government and the mine's owner, Westgold.
