= Tuckanarra, Western Australia =

Tuckanarra
- Town
- Interactive map of Tuckanarra
- Coordinates: 27°07′S 118°05′E
- Country: Australia
- State: Western Australia
- LGA: Shire of Cue
- Location: 692 km (430 mi) NNE of Perth; 41 km (25 mi) NNE of Cue
- Established: 1899

Government
  - State electorate: North West
  - Federal division: Durack
- Elevation: 481 m (1,578 ft)
- Postcode: 6640

Tuckanarra is a small town in the Shire of Cue in the Murchison region of Western Australia. The town is located between Cue and Meekatharra along the Great Northern Highway in the Mid West region of Western Australia.

== Gold mining ==
Gold was discovered in the area by two prospectors, Boyle and Moore, in 1897 and was initially known as Boyle's Find. The two prospectors were granted the reward claim. The original townsite was located near Boyd's Hill and the town was known as Boyd's for a while. Eventually the well at Cork Tree Flat was deepened and potable water was available so the town also became known as Cork Tree Flat.

A state battery was erected by the government in 1898, which led to the local progress association petitioning for a townsite to be declared. Following some debate on where it was to be situated, lots were surveyed in 1898 and the townsite was gazetted in 1899.

The town is named after a nearby hill and the name is Aboriginal in origin and the meaning of the name is thought to be camp of the wooden dish.

== Railway ==
Tuckenarra was a siding on the Mullewa–Meekatharra railway, between Mullewa and Meekatharra. The line closed in 1978.

== Energy ==
In 2010, Hyperion Energy purchased Karbar Station, a large property surrounding the town, proposing to construct a solar updraft tower power generation project. Construction was expected to commence in 2014, and the output is projected to be 200 megawatts.
