= Alfred Kidson =

Australian politician (1863–1937)

Member of the Legislative Council of Western Australia
- In office 18 July 1895 – 21 May 1902
- Preceded by: Harry Marshall
- Succeeded by: Matthew Moss
- Constituency: West Province

Personal details
- Born: 23 October 1863 Paddington, London, England
- Died: 23 May 1937 (aged 73) Belmont, Western Australia, Australia

Alfred Bowman Kidson (23 October 1863 – 23 May 1937) was an Australian lawyer, politician, and public servant. He was a member of the Legislative Council of Western Australia from 1895 to 1902, representing West Province.

== Early life and education ==
Kidson was born in London to Ernestine (née Morris) and William Kidson. He attended the Westminster School, and subsequently studied law in England. Kidson moved to Western Australia in 1887, and was admitted to the bar the same year.

== Career ==
He subsequently went into practice with Douglas Gawler, who was also a future MP. Kidson was the solicitor to the Fremantle Municipal Council for 15 years and was for many years also a police court magistrate.

Kidson served on the Claremont Road Board from 1893 to 1895. He first ran for parliament in 1894, the year in which the Legislative Council became fully elective. He placed fifth in that election, standing in West Province, but the following year won a by-election caused by the expulsion of Harry Marshall.

In 1896, Kidson was elected to a six-year term in his own right. He retired in 1902, and left for an extended trip to England the same year. On his return to Australia in 1905, Kidson began practising law in Northam. He attempted to return to the Legislative Council in 1914, running for the Liberal Party in East Province, but was defeated by Charles Baxter of the Country Party. Kidson eventually returned to Perth, and from 1923 to 1931 was the acting police magistrate. He was then appointed to the state government's civil service commission.

== Death ==
Kidson died in Perth on 23 May 1937, aged 73. He had married Constance Forbes in 1887, with whom he had four children. He was survived by his wife, one son, and one daughter.
