= Municipality of Day Dawn =

Former local government area in Western Australia

The Municipality of Day Dawn was a local government area in Western Australia centred on the mining town of Day Dawn.

It was established on 21 December 1894. It was placed under the Health Act and Building Act in 1896. The municipality built specialist municipal buildings in 1897.

It was responsible for managing the Day Dawn Recreation Ground and was responsible for instituting a system of electric lighting in the town. Health and sanitary issues were an ongoing problem for the municipality.

The municipal boundaries were extended one and a half miles due to the growth of the town in October 1901 and again on 31 August 1904. The size of the council was increased from six to nine members in 1902.

The municipality ceased to exist on 11 October 1912, when along with the nearby Municipality of Cue, it merged into the surrounding Cue Road District, which was in turn renamed the Cue-Day Dawn Road District. All councils ultimately supported the amalgamation, largely based on the need to improve their collective financial positions, despite a counter-push to redivide the three bodies as two new road districts.
