= Electoral district of Nannine =

Former electoral district in Western Australia

Nannine Western Australia—Legislative Assembly
- State: Western Australia
- Dates current: 1894–1897
- Namesake: Nannine

Nannine was an electoral district of the Legislative Assembly in the Australian state of Western Australia from 1894 to 1897.

The district was located in the Western Australian outback. It existed for one term of parliament, and was represented in that time by Ministerialist Frederick Illingworth. Following the district's abolition, Illingworth switched to the seat of Central Murchison at the 1897 general election.

== Members for Nannine ==
Member	Party	Term
Frederick Illingworth	Opposition	1894–1897
