= Denis Marshall (footballer) =

Australian rules footballer (born 1940)

Personal information
- Full name: Deniston Clive Marshall
- Born: 17 October 1940 (age 86); Beaconsfield, Western Australia
- Height: 183 cm (6 ft 0 in)
- Weight: 85 kg (187 lb)

Playing career^{1}
| Years | Club | Games (Goals) |
| 1958–1963, 1969–1972 | Claremont | 175 (89) |
| 1964–1968 | Geelong | 84 (25) |
| Total | | 259 (114) |

Representative team honours
| Years | Team | Games (Goals) |
| 1958–? | Western Australia | 16 (1) |
| 1966 | Victoria | 8 (1) |

Coaching career^{3}
| Years | Club | Games (W–L–D) |
| 1969–1971 | Claremont | 64 (28–35–1) |
- ^{1} Playing statistics correct to the end of 1972.^{3} Coaching statistics correct as of 1971.

Career highlights
- Claremont best and fairest 1959, 1961, 1963, 1970; Geelong best and fairest 1966; All-Australian team 1966; Claremont captain-coach 1969–1971; Australian Football Hall of Fame inductee 2004; West Australian Football Hall of Fame inductee 2004

Deniston Clive Marshall (born 17 October 1940) is a former Australian rules footballer who represented Claremont in the West Australian National Football League (WANFL) and Geelong in the Victorian Football League (VFL) from the 1950s to the 1970s.

== Family ==
The son of George Watson Marshall, and Sylvie Marshall, née Tuxford, Deniston Clive Marshall was born at Beaconsfield, Western Australia on 17 October 1940. He married Wendy Dorothy Boulding in 1964.

His grandfather, Gordon Tuxford, had captained South Fremantle in the 1920s.

== Football ==
=== Western Australia ===
Marshall was already a star while playing for the Mosman Park Juniors. He made his senior debut with Claremont in 1958. He won four best and fairest awards with Claremont and was runner up in the 1962 Sandover Medal award for the fairest and best player in the WANFL.

=== Victoria ===
Controversially recruited to Victorian side Geelong in 1964, he was eventually cleared, and was an immediate success — making his debut (kicking one of Geelong's six goals) against Footscray on 6 June 1964.

Marshall played 84 games over five seasons with Geelong from 1964 to 1968. He won Geelong's best-and-fairest in 1966, and was second in the Brownlow Medal in 1968 before returning to Perth at the age of 27.

=== Interstate football ===
Marshall represented Western Australia in his first year of senior football. He went on to represent Western Australia 14 times — and also represented Victoria eight times in interstate matches. He was selected in the All-Australian Team following the 1966 Hobart Carnival.

=== Halls of fame ===
In 2004 Marshall was inducted into both the WA Football Hall of Fame and the Australian Football Hall of Fame.

== Post-playing career ==
After retiring, Marshall worked in real estate development. He founded the popular Perth gay nightclub Connections on the suggestion of a friend.

In February 2008 it was reported that Marshall's property had been attacked during the night.

== See also ==
- Coulter Law

== Bibliography ==
- Holmesby, Russell; Main, Jim (2011). The Encyclopedia of AFL Footballers: Every AFL/VFL Player since 1897 (9th ed.). Seaford: Bas Publishing. ISBN 978-1-921496-12-7.
- Casey, Kevin (1995). The Tigers' Tale: the origins and history of the Claremont Football Club. Claremont Football Club. ISBN 0-646-26498-2.
