= Court Hotel =

Heritage-listed hotel in Perth, Western Australia

- The Court

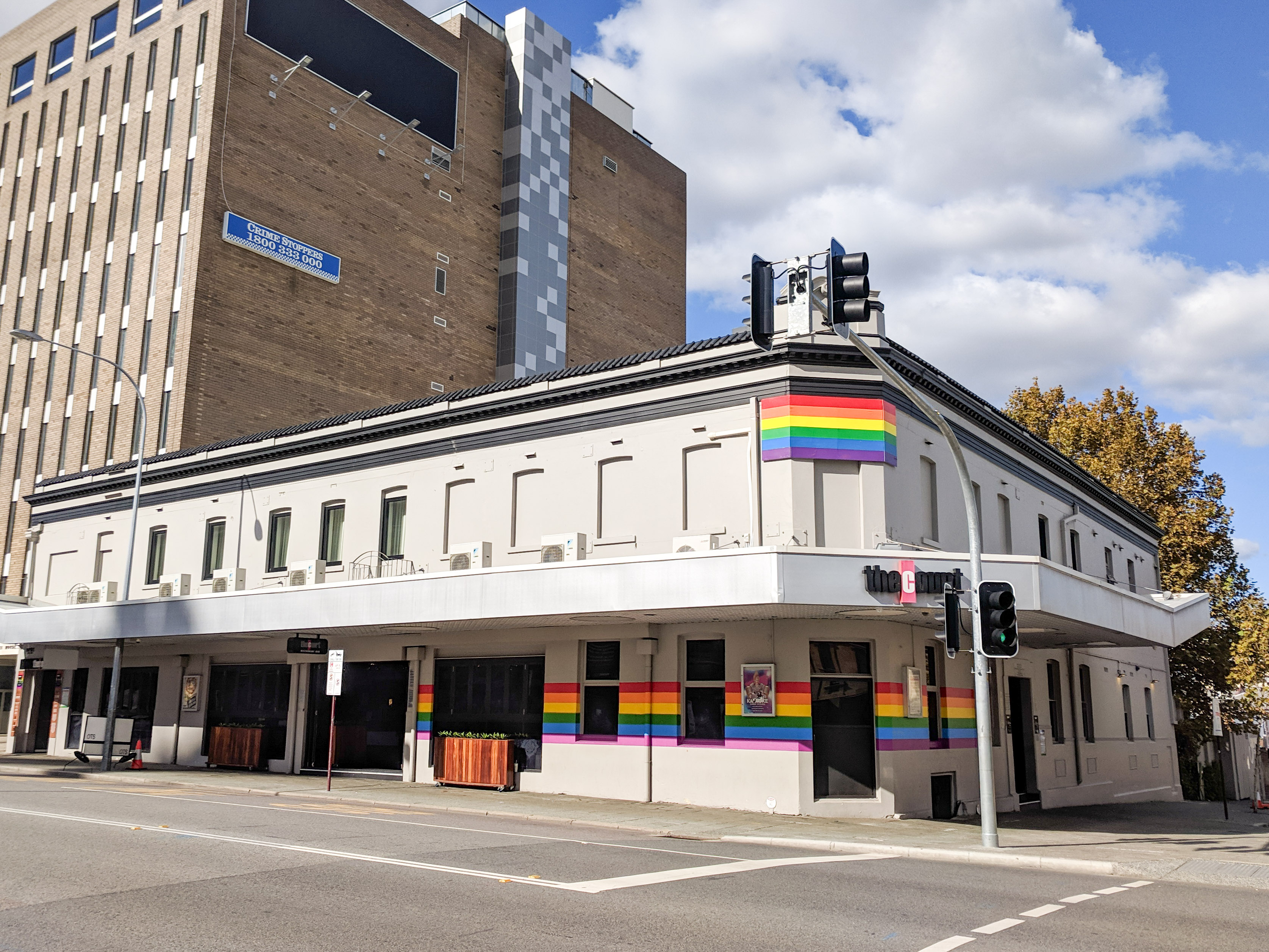
- The Court in 2019
- Interactive map of Court Hotel
- Address: 50 Beaufort Street; Perth; Australia
- Coordinates: 31.95028°S 115.862471°E
- Type: Music venue; bar

Website
- thecourt.com.au

Court Hotel, colloquially known as the Court, is a prominent music venue and bar in Perth, the capital of Western Australia.

Located at the corner of Beaufort Street and James Street, it is an historic venue built in 1888 that has operated continually as a hotel and social hub for over 130 years. Since the early 1990s, the venue has been a primary cultural center for the LGBTQ+ community in Western Australia.

== Description and Layout ==
The Court functions as a multi-level "super-venue" complex with a total licensed capacity of approximately 1,500 patrons. Following a $5 million expansion completed in 2017, the venue significantly increased its footprint into adjacent properties, resulting in six distinct bars and multiple performance spaces.

The venue features a large, astroturf-lined outdoor courtyard which serves as the primary concert space. This area includes a permanent high-specification stage utilized for international DJs and live music. Internal spaces include the original heritage-listed Main Bar and The Verdict, an industrial-style upstairs bar and dance floor added during the 2017 renovations. The exterior of the venue is notable for its vibrant street-art murals, including work by artist Jackson Harvey.

== Technical Facilities ==
As a specialized music and performance venue, The Court maintains professional-grade audio-visual infrastructure:

- Audio: The outdoor courtyard is equipped with a concert-grade line array sound system designed to support touring electronic acts and high-decibel live performances.
- Staging: The venue features a permanent outdoor stage with integrated LED screen backdrops. A modular indoor stage is primarily used for cabaret and drag performances.
- Broadcasting: For major community events, such as the Pride Street Party, the venue utilizes multi-camera feeds projected onto external screens to engage crowds on James Street.

== History and operations ==
The Court Hotel was constructed in 1888 in the Victorian Regency architectural style, and later renovated to include Federation Free Classical style and, mostly internally, the Inter-War Art Deco style. The name of the venue comes from its position across the road from a building in the Perth cultural precinct that used to operate as a Magistrates court.

From 1903, it was operated by Con O'Brien, the first Labor member of the Legislative Council.

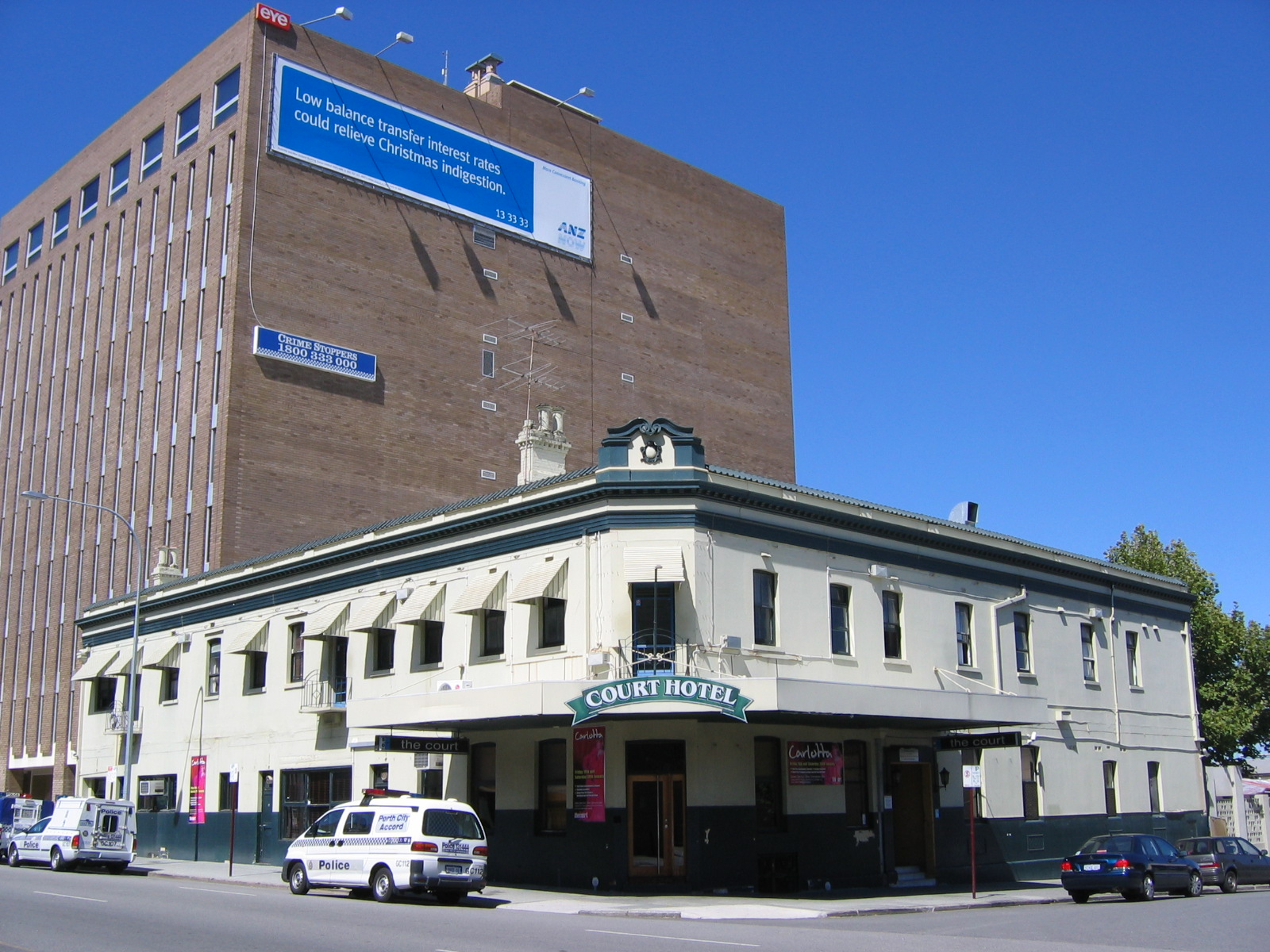
Court Hotel in 2007

Extensive renovations were undertaken in 1938, 2007, 2012 and 2017.

As of 2016, the venue is solely owned by Bree Maddox, a Perth socialite and former Penthouse model. The venue was formerly owned jointly by Maddox and her partner, Malcolm Day; prior to their separation.

In 2019 and 2021, the venue faced criticism from members of Perth's LGBTQ+ community. This criticism followed the resurfacing of historic images of drag queen Scarlet Adams performing in blackface at the venue; as well as claims from some patrons that antisocial and anti-queer behaviour had been experienced by patrons. In response to these criticisms, the venue adorned its entrance with rainbow colours while its owners publicly stated their support for the LGBTQ+ community; and hired additional security, but declined a requested ban on non-queer patrons. In response to the blackface allegations, the venue issued an apology.

In 2022, a mural was painted onto the side of the building by Fremantle-based artist Jackson Harvey.

In September 2023, Australian Venue Co. entered an agreement to purchase the venue from Maddox.

== Events ==
The Court Hotel functions as a multi-purpose entertainment complex featuring six bars and three dance floors.

=== LGBTQ+ Community and Pride Events ===
Since the early 1990s, the venue has served as a central cultural hub for Perth's LGBTQ+ community. Its most significant annual event is the Pride Street Party, held every November as the official after-party for the Perth Pride Parade. The event often involves the closure of a section of James Street to accommodate thousands of attendees and features multiple outdoor stages and themed party zones.

=== Drag Performance and Cabaret ===
The venue is a cornerstone of the local drag industry. It hosts Drag Factory, a long-running weekly amateur drag competition that has served as a career starting point for many of Perth's prominent drag artists. In addition to weekly shows, the hotel hosts regular "Drag Brunches" and ticketed cabaret performances. Notable resident performers have included Fay Rocious and Cougar Morrison, and the venue frequently hosts touring contestants from the RuPaul's Drag Race franchise.

=== Live Music and International Performers ===
Operating as a major nightlife venue, The Court hosts a variety of touring acts and local DJs across its indoor and outdoor stages. Notable international and domestic artists who have performed at the venue include Melanie C, RuPaul, Ruby Rose, and Artful Dodger.

=== Festivals and Special Events ===
The Court is a regular venue for the Fringe World Festival, hosting a diverse lineup of comedy and cabaret. Other recurring events include:

- Rag Pop Up: A fashion market featuring local designers and vintage clothing.
- Community Fundraisers: Events held in support of organizations such as Pride WA and local charities.
- Themed Club Nights: Including university student nights, nostalgia-themed events, and "Traffic Light" parties.
- Sapphic Disco: The Court is the home of regular sapphic-focused event Sapphic Disco.

== See also ==
- Connections Nightclub
- William Street Bird
- Picabar
