= Con O'Brien (politician) =

Australian politician (1866–1938)

The Honourable Con O'Brien

Member of the Legislative Council of Western Australia
- In office 30 January 1901 – 30 May 1904
- Preceded by: Frederic Whitcombe
- Succeeded by: William Patrick
- Constituency: Central Province
- In office 13 May 1908 – 21 May 1914
- Preceded by: Joseph Thomson
- Succeeded by: Henry Carson
- Constituency: Central Province

Personal details
- Born: 20 April 1866 Ballarat West, Victoria, Australia
- Died: 11 December 1938 (aged 72) Perth, Western Australia, Australia
- Party: Labor

Bartholomew Cornelius "Con" O'Brien (20 April 1866 – 11 December 1938) was an Australian politician who served as a Labor Party member of the Legislative Council of Western Australia from 1901 to 1904 and again from 1908 to 1914.

O'Brien was born in Ballarat, Victoria, and came to Western Australia in 1893, during the gold rushes. He initially lived in Derby (in the Kimberley), but in 1894 went to Cue (in the Mid West), to prospect for gold. In February 1895, he became the proprietor of the town's Great Britain Hotel, maintaining the lease until 1903.

O'Brien was elected to the Cue Municipal Council in 1896, and from 1897 to 1900 served as mayor. He was elected to parliament at a 1901 Legislative Council by-election for Central Province, caused by the resignation of Frederic Whitcombe.

His candidacy was supported by the Amalgamated Workers' Association (a forerunner of the Australian Workers' Union), and he subsequently joined the parliamentary Labor Party, becoming one of its first members in the Legislative Council. O'Brien lost his seat at the 1904 elections.

He regained his seat in 1908, replacing the retiring Joseph Thomson. The result was a tie of 564 votes each for O'Brien and his opponent, Mr. Carson. The returning officer resolved the tie in favour of O'Brien.

He left parliament in 1914, at the end of his six-year term, and returned to the hotel trade, running the Court Hotel in Perth (which he had acquired in 1906). A prominent member of the Irish community in Perth and a leader of the annual Saint Patrick's Day, he died at his hotel in December 1938, aged 72.
