= Cuddingwarra =

Abandoned town in Western Australia

- Town
- Interactive map of Cuddingwarra
- Coordinates: 27.367°S 117.783°E
- Country: Australia
- State: Western Australia
- LGA: Shire of Cue
- Location: 665 km (413 mi) NNE of Perth; 14 km (8.7 mi) W of Cue
- Established: 1895

Government
  - State electorate: North West
  - Federal division: Durack
- Elevation: 455 m (1,493 ft)
- Postcode: 6640

Cuddingwarra is an abandoned town in the Mid West region of Western Australia. The town is located between Cue and Big Bell.

Gold was discovered in the area in 1888, with the town being initially known as Dead Finish. The name that was chosen was the name of the nearby Cuddingwarra hill. The hill was first recorded on an application for a pastoral lease submitted by the Lacy brothers in 1878–79. The town was gazetted in 1895.

By 1898 the town supported a bi-weekly coach service to Cue and had its own post office. Three hotels were known to exist in the town – the Cuddingwarra Hotel, the Roadside Hotel and the Victory United Hotel.

The Amphlett and Keating, a mining company, presented samples of gold of considerable value to the Bank of Australia in Perth from their mine in Cuddingwarra in 1895.

A ten head battery existed in the town in 1898, which was used by the local mining companies such as Cuddingwarra Gold Mines Ltd and the Siege of Paris mine. The mill was later upgraded to a fifteen head mill when being used to treat ore from the Fraser's South Mine.

The name is Aboriginal in origin but its meaning is unknown.
