= Duke of Wellington Hotel, Melbourne =

Duke of Wellington Hotel
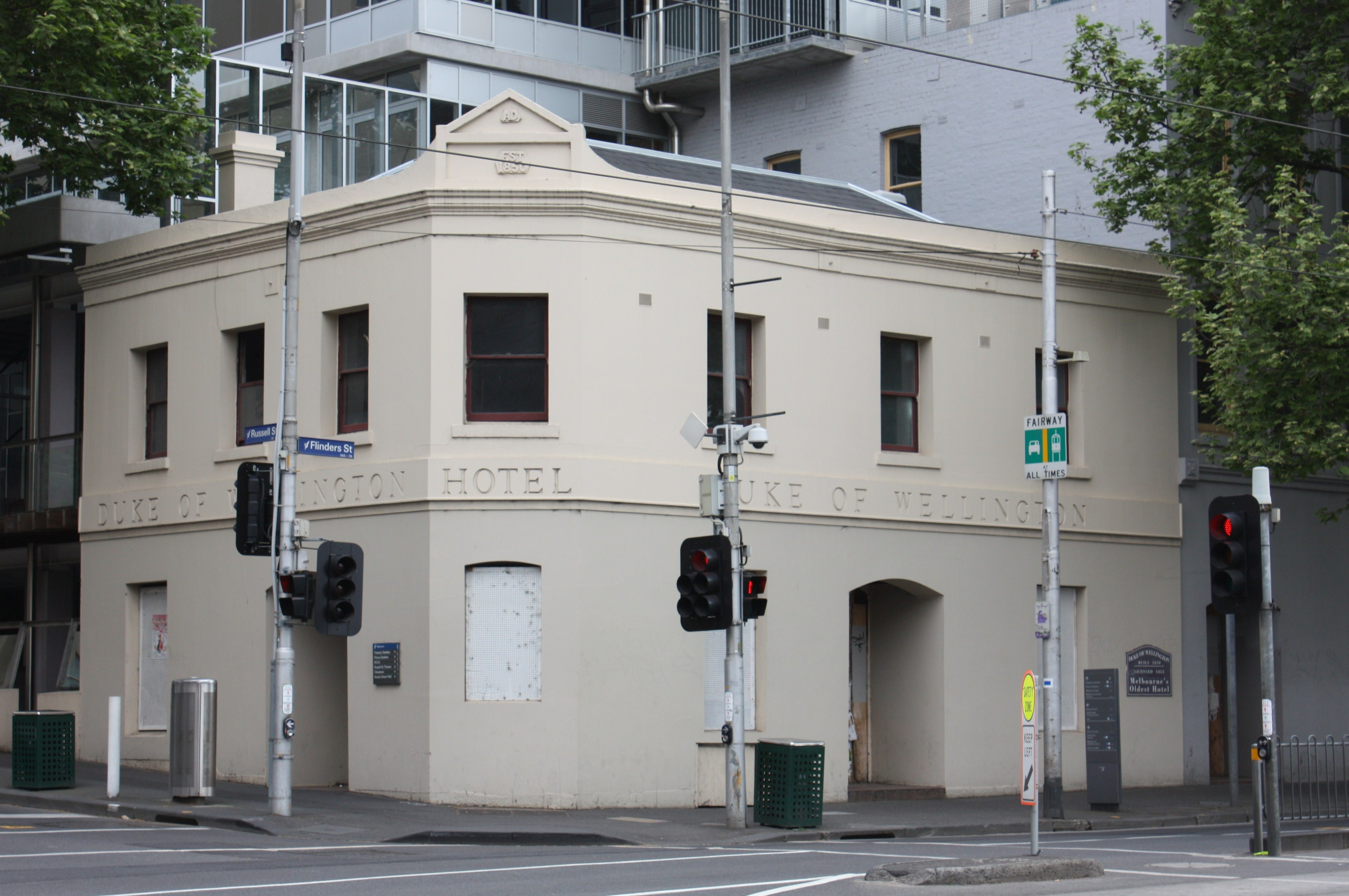

General information
- Location: 146 Flinders Street, Melbourne, Victoria, Australia
- Coordinates: 37°48′59″S 144°58′12″E
- Completed: 1850

Technical details
- Floor count: 3

Design and construction
- Architect: Richard Dalton

Website
- dukeofwellington.com.au

The Duke of Wellington Hotel is a heritage listed hotel within the Melbourne CBD in Victoria, Australia. Named after the Arthur Wellesley, 1st Duke of Wellington, it was designed by Richard Dalton for Timothy Lane, a local businessman and carpenter. Construction completed in 1850, with a liquor licence unsuccessfully applied for in 1851 and 1852. It was a boarding house until 1853, when a liquor licence was obtained. It closed for renovations in 2006, and reopened in 2013. It has been cited as the oldest pub in Melbourne.

It is currently owned by Australian Venue Co.
