= Lake Austin (Australia) =

Lake in Western Australia

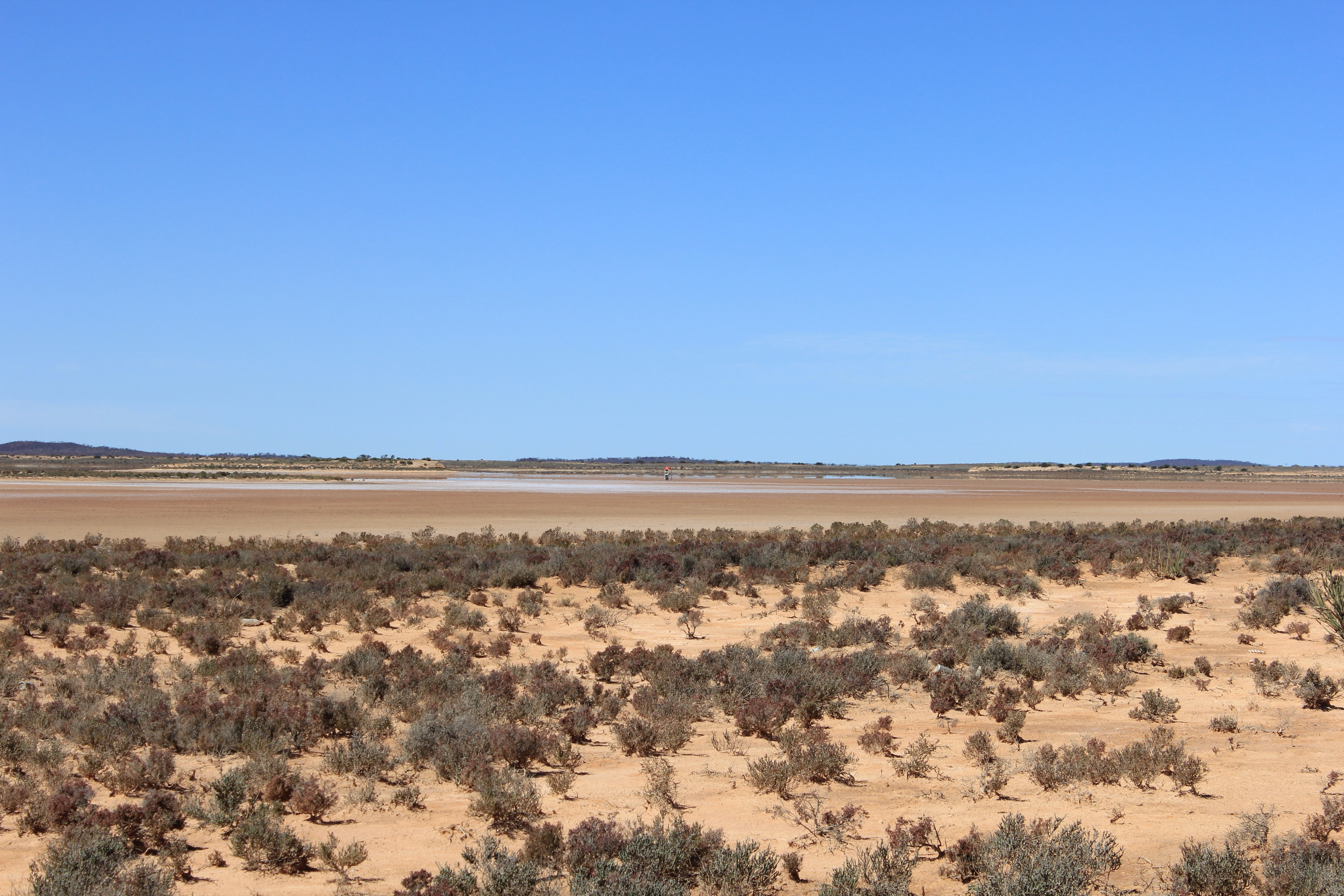
- Lake Austin in autumn 2014

- Location in Western Australia
- Interactive map of Lake Austin
- Location: Western Australia
- Coordinates: 27°37′24″S 117°54′48″E
- Type: Salt lake
- Catchment area: 13,750 km^{2} (5,310 sq mi)
- Basin countries: Australia
- Max. length: 80 km^{2} (31 sq mi)
- Max. width: 40 km^{2} (15 sq mi)
- Surface area: 0–980 km^{2} (0–378 sq mi)
- Islands: many
- Settlements: Austin

Lake Austin is an ephemeral salt lake in the Mid West region of Western Australia, approximately 21 km (13 mi) south of Cue and 55 km (34 mi) north of Mount Magnet. It is named after Robert Austin, who explored the area around the lake in 1854. The abandoned town of Austin is located on an island in the lake. The Great Northern Highway passes through this island as it crosses the lake. Lake Austin is also the name of the locality surrounding it.

Lake Austin is an evaporation basin for an arheic internal drainage system covering an area of 13,750 square kilometres (5,310 sq mi). The lake itself lies in a basin covering 770 square kilometres (300 sq mi), or 440 square kilometres (170 sq mi) excluding the many islands. It is about 80 kilometres (50 mi) long and 10–40 kilometres (6.2–24.9 mi) wide. The lake usually fills in response to heavy rainfall in the summer and autumn; anecdotally, this occurs twice about every ten years. Water salinity varies according to lake levels: recorded values have ranged from 44.8 mS/cm during a flooding event in 2000, to 164 mS/cm in the late 1970s. The lake bed is flat, variably crusted with salt, and devoid of vegetation. It is surrounded by a salt marsh dominated by the samphire species Tecticornia fimbrata, Tecticornia halocnemoides and Tecticornia pruinosa. The catchment area is composed of gently undulating saline stony plains with associated internal drainage lines and several scattered drainage foci. The lake is situated on major ancient drainage lines and has massive supplies of saline water from sand aquifers at the base of the paleochannels from depths of 80 to 120 m (260 to 390 ft). Annually the catchment receives rainfall of 233 mm (9.2 in) and has an evaporation rate 3,574 mm (140.7 in).

The main land uses around Lake Austin are mining and pastoralism. A large deposit of gypsum sand is located on the edge of the lake. From 1999 to 2002, hypersaline groundwater from the Cuddingwarra gold mine was discharged into Lake Austin. The Austin Downs pastoral station covers part of the lake. Sheep are grazed in the area and feral goats and donkeys are abundant.

== See also ==
- List of lakes of Australia § Western Australia
