= Big Bell, Western Australia =

Ghost town in Western Australia

Big Bell
- Town
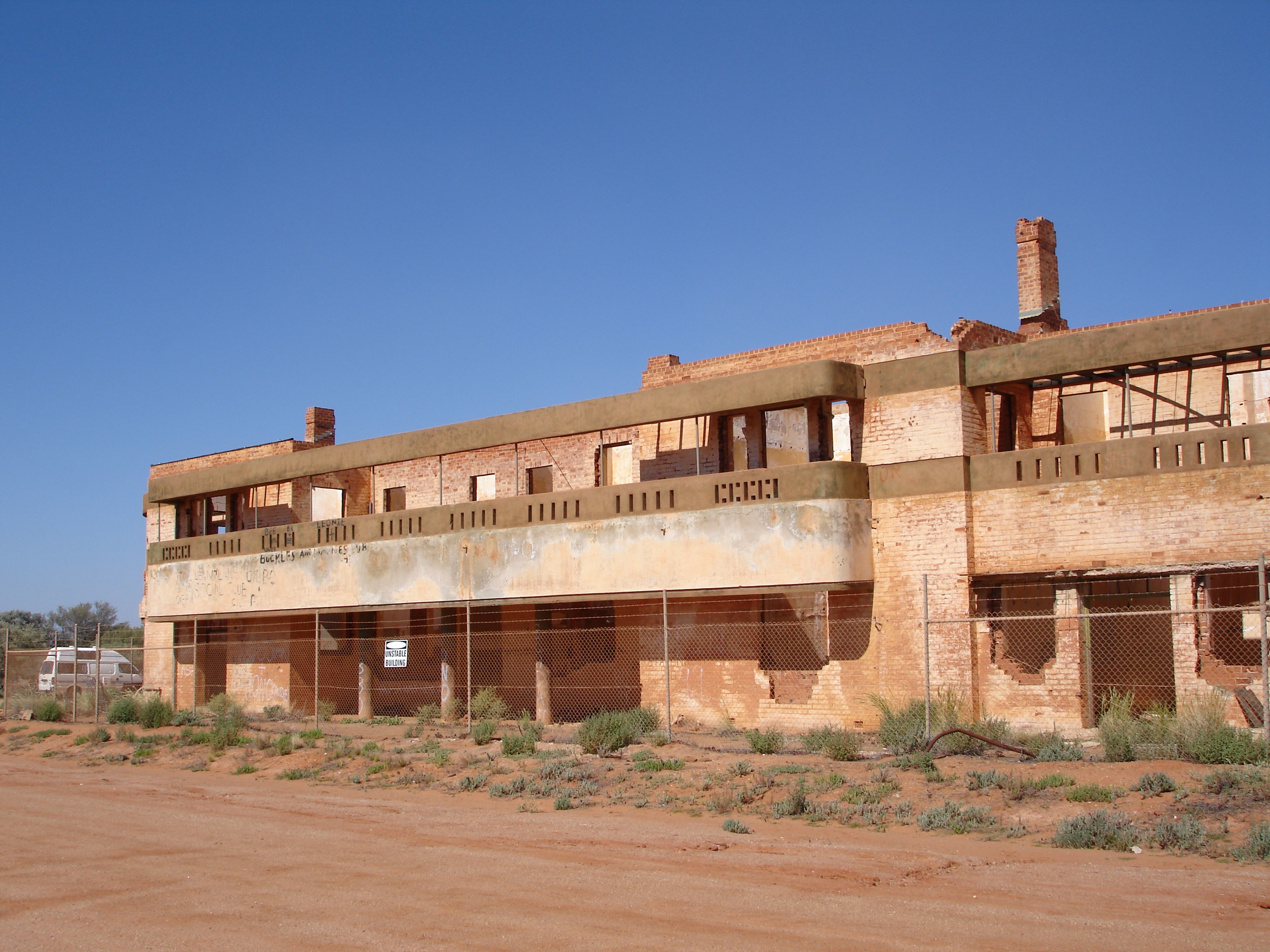
- The ruins of the Big Bell Hotel, 2009.

- Interactive map of Big Bell
- Coordinates: 27°20′25″S 117°39′37″E
- Country: Australia
- State: Western Australia
- LGA: Shire of Cue
- Established: 1936

Government
  - State electorate: North West
  - Federal division: Durack

Population
  - Total: 0 (abandoned)

Big Bell is a ghost town in Western Australia located approximately 30 km (19 mi) south west of the town of Cue. The town was established in 1936, and was home to the Big Bell Gold Mine.

== History ==
Gold was discovered in the area in 1904 by Harry Paton and a mine was quickly established. Ownership of the mine changed a number of times through the years. Premier Gold Mining Company announced plans to develop the Big Bell Mine in 1935.

A township was established close to the mine in 1936 to provide accommodation for the mine workers. 36 blocks were sold in April of that year and another 80 in June. A population of about 850 soon inhabited the townsite and services included a number of shops, a post office and a hospital.

One of the proposed names for the town was "Townsend", with the main street to be known as "Coodardy Street".

The Big Bell Hotel was constructed and opened in 1937. It was a classic art deco style of the period, but is now a ruin. The large two storey building of brick construction has brick colonnading to the north and east facades and a curved corner and once had a tiled roof. The hotel was reputed to have the longest bar in Australia.

=== Railway ===
It is a former railway branch terminus in Western Australia's Murchison Region. Construction of the line was authorised through the Cue-Big Bell Railway Act 1936, assented to on 3 November 1936. Prior to this, on 5 March 1936, the Western Australian government had entered an agreement with the American Smelting and Refining Company to build the railway to Big Bell. The first train arrived in Big Bell on 6 January 1937, however the line was not officially opened until 12 August that year. Services ceased from September 1944, but were revived the following year when the war in Europe was winding down and the gold mine reopened. The line finally closed on 31 December 1955. The Railways (Cue-Big Bell and other Railways) Discontinuance Act 1960, which officially closed the Big Bell branch line, was assented to on 12 December 1960.

Mining ceased in 2003 and the plant was dismantled and transported to the Westonia minesite in 2007. Not many of the buildings remain, but the roads stay visible in their original position as dirt tracks, and the layout of the town is clearly discernible from the air.
