= Austin, Western Australia =

Abandoned town in Western Australia

Austin
- Town
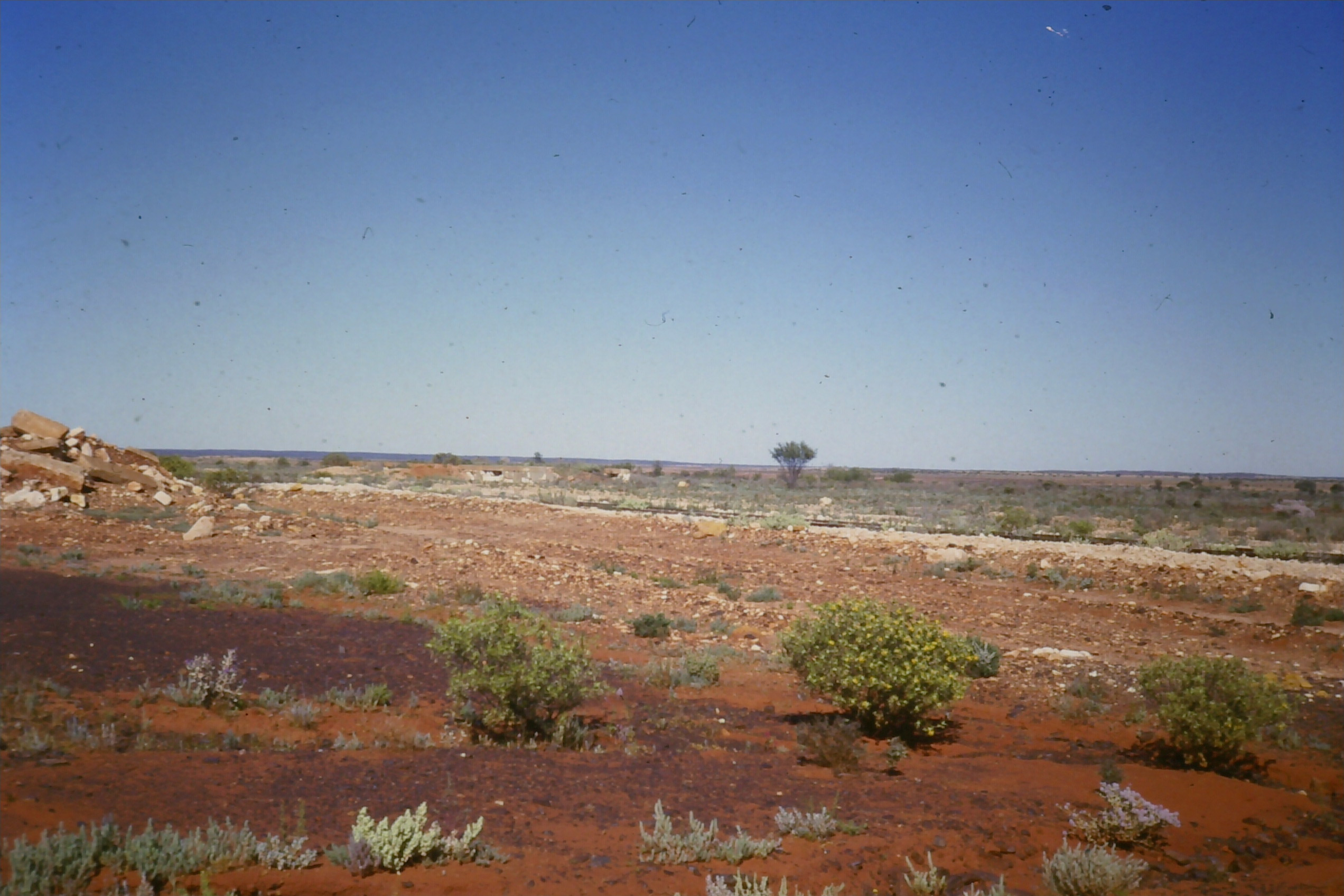
- Lake Austin train station ruins

- Interactive map of Austin
- Coordinates: 27.64°S 117.874°E
- Country: Australia
- State: Western Australia
- LGA: Shire of Cue
- Location: 625 km (388 mi) NNE of Perth; 23 km (14 mi) S of Cue; 48 km (30 mi) N of Mount Magnet
- Established: 1895

Government
  - State electorate: North West
  - Federal division: Durack
- Elevation: 423 m (1,388 ft)

Austin is an abandoned town in the Murchison region of Western Australia. The town is located south of Cue on an island in Lake Austin and for this reason was also known as Lake Austin and The Island Lake Austin.

The lake and the town are both named after surveyor Robert Austin, who was the first European to explore and chart the area. Austin initially named the lake the Great Inland Marsh but the name was later changed to Lake Austin. The townsite was gazetted in 1895.

When Austin travelled through the area he described it as "very indifferent" but also added "the geological features ... indicate rich gold fields".

The town had one ten head stamp mill operating the Austin mine just outside town in 1895.

Transport to and from the town was originally provided by a bi-weekly coach from Yalgoo but by 1898 the railway was extended to the town.

The townsite is still visible from the Great Northern Highway.

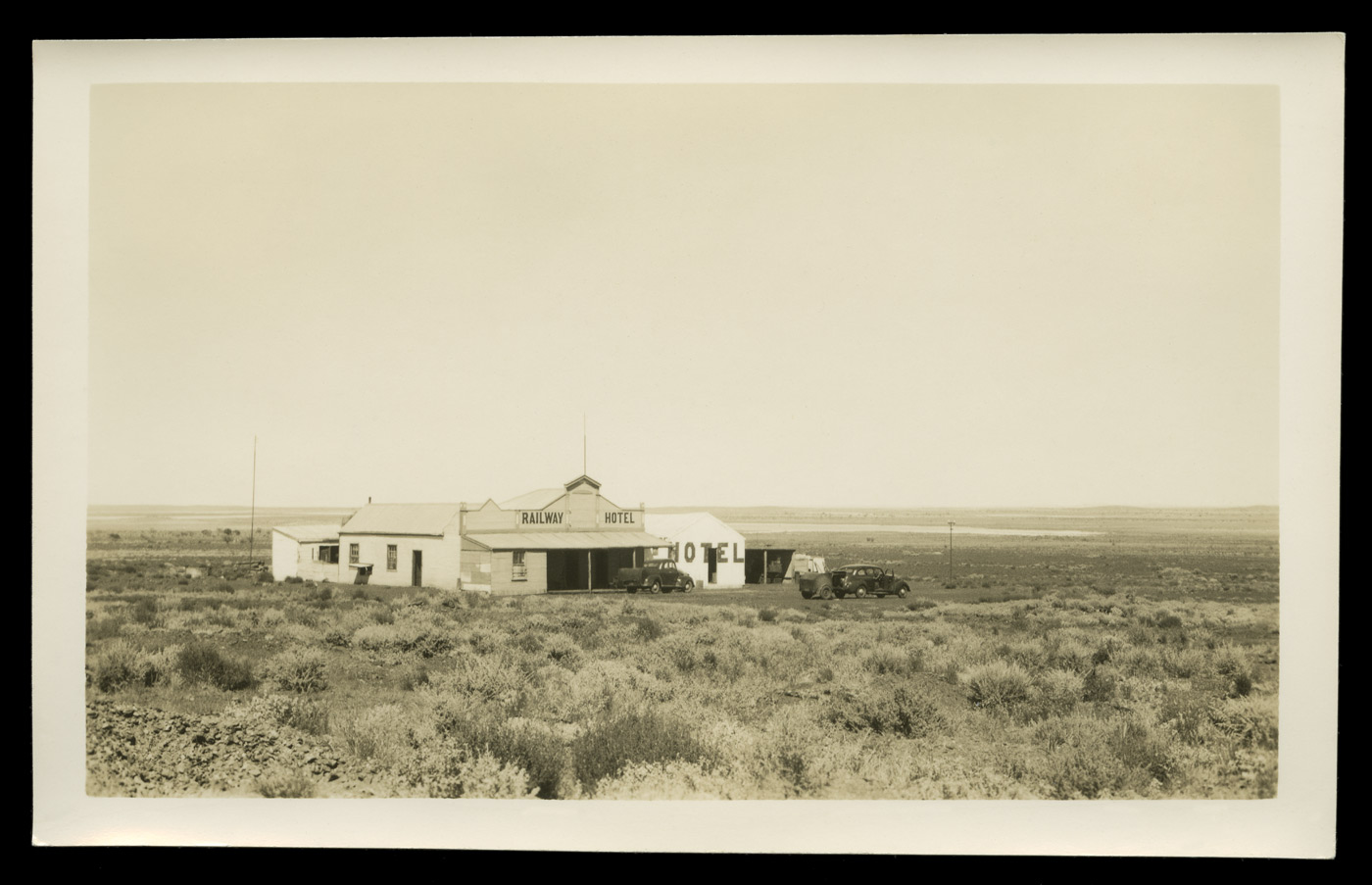
Lake Austin township, Murchison region of Western Australia c. 1950

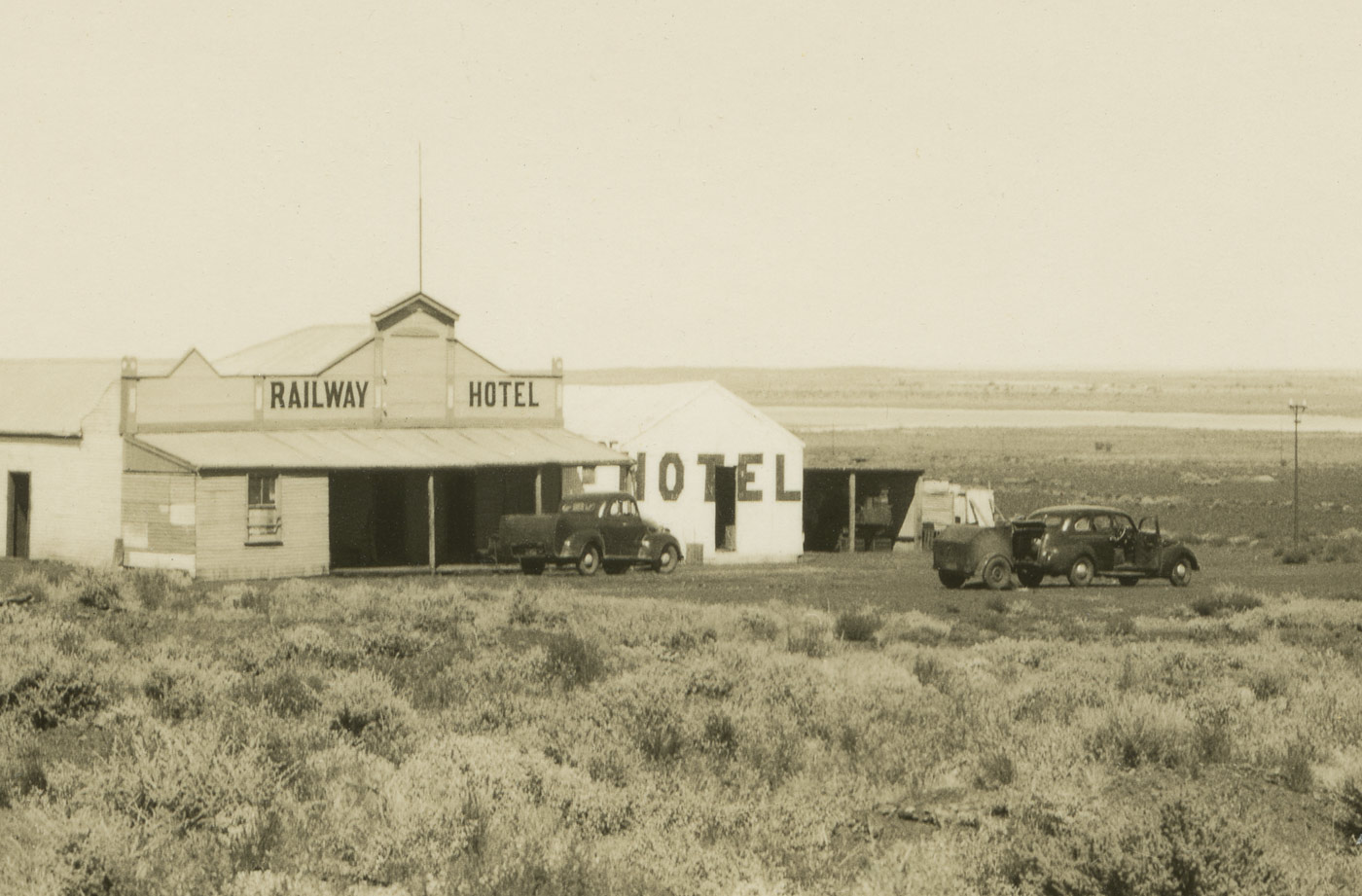
Lake Austin township, Murchison region of Western Australia c. 1950
