= Frederick Illingworth =

Australian politician

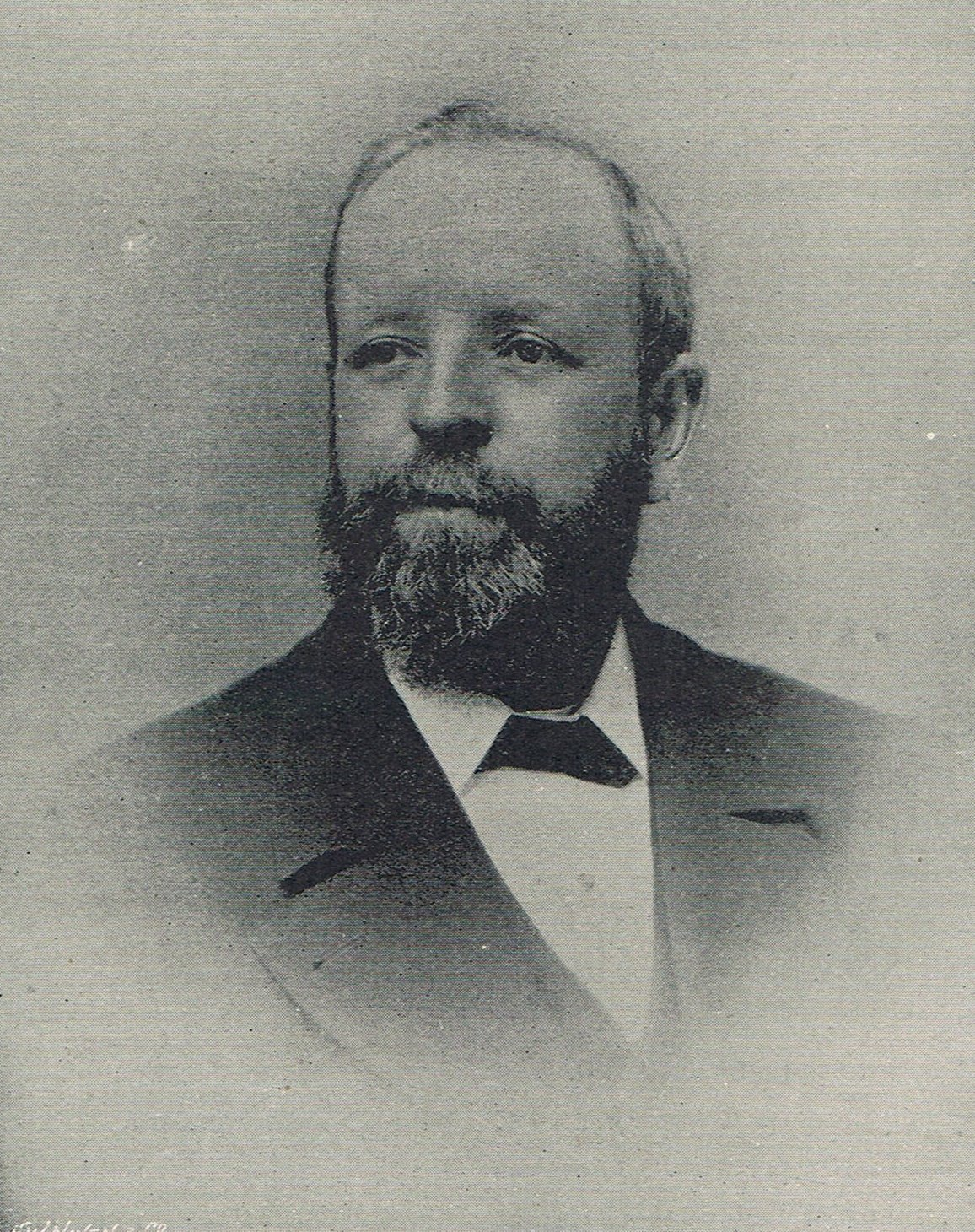
Frederick Illingworth

Frederick Illingworth (24 September 1844 – 8 September 1908), was an Australian politician, who was a Member of Parliament in two Australian colonies (later states), and a government minister in Western Australia. As a financer of land speculation in Victoria in the 1880s, he was heavily involved in the Victorian land boom.

== Early life ==
Frederick Illingworth was born in Little Horton, now part of Bradford, West Yorkshire, on 24 September 1844. The son of a woolcomber, at the age of four he emigrated to Victoria, with his family. As a young man he worked as an ironmonger at Brighton, Melbourne, and he later acquired pastoral land at Yalook. In the late 1870s, he partnered with J. R. Hoskins to form an estate agency, but the business failed. In 1883, he returned to ironmongery, establishing an electroplating business in Melbourne.

== Victorian Land Boom ==
The Victorian Land Boom was a period of intense real estate speculation in the 1880s, driven by the rapid growth of Melbourne’s population, an influx of immigrants, and the widespread belief that land values would continue to rise. The boom began in the early 1880s and peaked around 1888, when land prices skyrocketed. However, the boom proved unsustainable, culminating in a dramatic crash by 1889. Numerous land companies went into liquidation, and many investors were left with substantial debts.

One of the key figures in the land speculation was Frederick Illingworth, who founded the Centennial Land Bank in 1888. Illingworth became the major shareholder in the bank, which was created to provide financing for land speculation during the boom. The bank played a significant role in fuelling the bubble by offering loans to land developers and investors. However, when the land market collapsed, Illingworth was left with a massive debt of £300,000.

As the bubble burst, Illingworth's financial troubles were compounded by his political career. In July 1889, he was elected to the Victorian Legislative Council for the Northern Province. In 1890, he was granted a leave of absence from parliament for a "business trip to Europe." However, Illingworth disembarked in Perth, Western Australia, and never returned to Melbourne. His seat was declared vacant the following year due to his non-attendance. His departure from politics marked the end of his public career, with the financial failure of the land boom remaining a defining chapter in his life.

The collapse of the Victorian Land Boom had a profound effect on the local economy and on Illingworth's fortunes, serving as a cautionary tale of the dangers of speculative investment and the unsustainable nature of such economic bubbles.

== In Western Australia ==
In Western Australia, Illingworth established himself as a land and estate agent, and invested in a number of mines in the Murchison district. On 5 July 1894, he was elected to the Western Australian Legislative Assembly in the seat of Nannine. He held the seat until its abolition at the election of May 1897, when he won the seat of Central Murchison. That in turn was abolished at the election of 24 April 1901, so Illingworth contested and won the seat of Cue. Defeated for Cue by Edward Heitmann in the election of 27 June 1904, he successfully contested the seat of West Perth on 27 October 1905, holding it until his resignation on 13 August 1907.

Illingworth initially sat in parliament in opposition to John Forrest's government. From August 1900 until May 1901, he was Leader of the Opposition, and was accordingly called upon to form a government when Forrest's successor George Throssell resigned as premier in May 1901. He was unable to do so, however, because George Leake refused to serve under him, and the other oppositionists would not serve without Leake. Eventually, an agreement was reached whereby Leake became Premier and Illingworth became Colonial Treasurer and Colonial Secretary. He held those portfolios throughout the term of the First Leake Ministry, and was reappointed to the positions in the Second Leake Ministry. Following Leake's death in June 1902, Illingworth was not included in the ministry of Leake's successor Walter James. He was Chairman of Committees from 3 December 1903 to 27 June 1904, and again from 30 November 1905, until his resignation. Illingworth's creditors released him from his financial obligations in 1903, and the Government of Western Australia then granted him £1000 as compensation for the financial proceedings taken against him in Victoria. After his resignation from the Legislative Assembly in August 1907, he returned to Victoria. He died at Brighton, Victoria on 8 September 1908, and was buried in Melbourne Cemetery.

== Family ==
Illingworth married Elizabeth Tarry (c. 1845 – 20 January 1896) on 5 September 1867. Their children included:

- Albert Ebenezer Illingworth (20 January 1868 – 16 October 1942) was a Church of Christ minister, born at 289 Lygon Street, Carlton
- Alice Rose Elizabeth Illingworth (1870 – 10 June 1911)

He married again, to Jane McGregor at Adelaide, South Australia on 18 November 1896. They had no children together.

He had a sister Mary Jane Illingworth, who died at Sandhurst, Victoria, on 12 September 1875.

== See also ==
- Illingworth v Houldsworth
- Alfred Illingworth
