= Shire of Cue =

Coordinates: 27°25′16″S 117°53′46″E

- Local government area
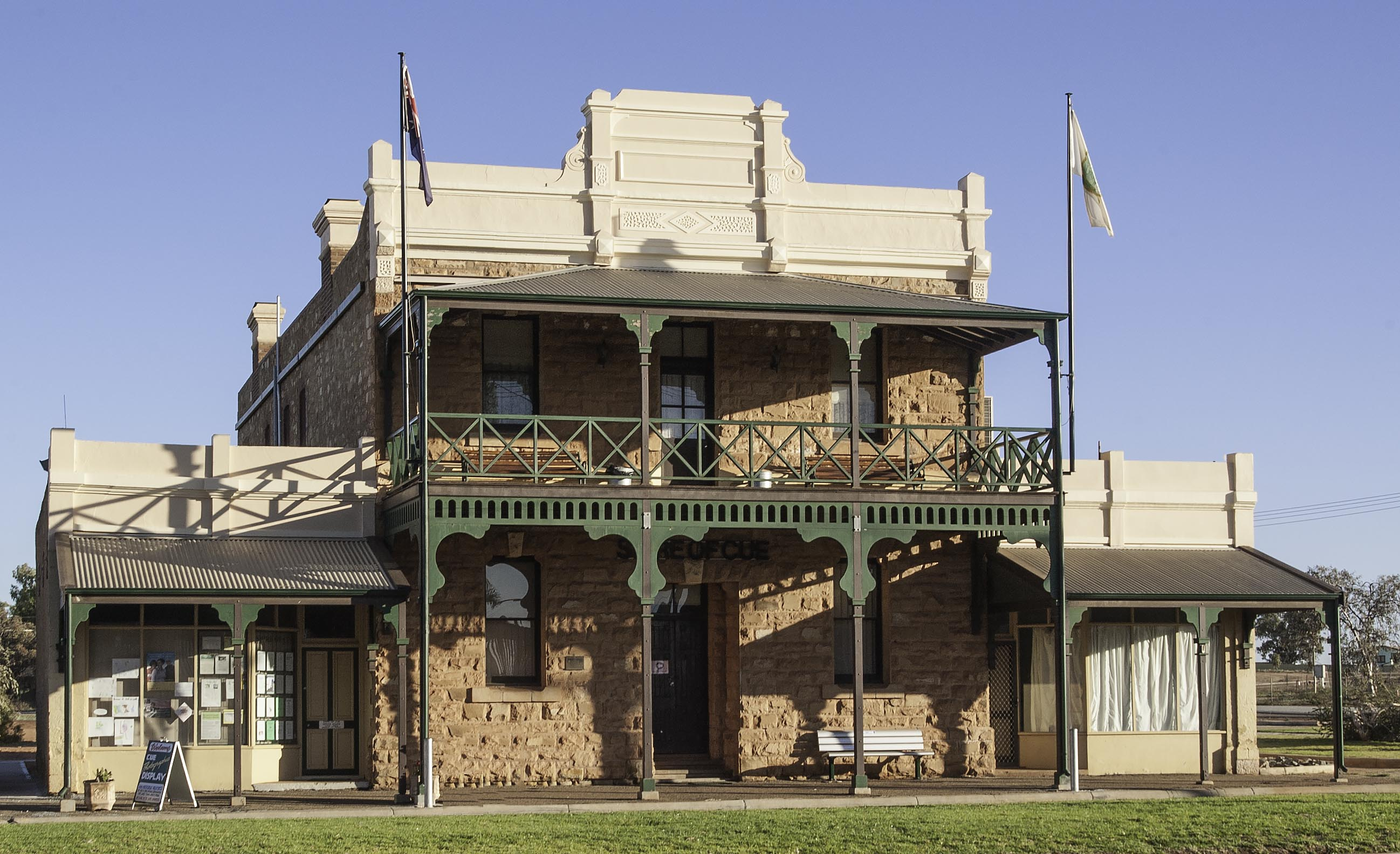
- The Cue Shire Offices

- Interactive map of Shire of Cue
- Country: Australia
- State: Western Australia
- Region: Mid West
- Council seat: Cue

Government
  - Shire President: Ross Pigdon
  - State electorate: Mid-West
  - Federal division: Durack

Area
  - Total: 13,622.9 km^{2} (5,259.8 sq mi)

Population
  - Total: 215 (LGA 2021)
- Website: Shire of Cue
LGAs around Shire of Cue
Murchison	Meekatharra	Meekatharra
Yalgoo	Shire of Cue	Sandstone
Yalgoo	Mount Magnet	Sandstone

The Shire of Cue is a local government area in the Mid West region of Western Australia, about 420 kilometres (260 mi) east-northeast of the port city of Geraldton and about 650 kilometres (400 mi) north-northeast of the state capital, Perth. The Shire covers an area of 13,623 square kilometres (5,260 sq mi), and its seat of government is the town of Cue.

== History ==
The Shire of Cue originated as the Cue Road District, which was established on 6 December 1895. Part of the road district separated with the formation of the Mount Magnet Road District on 20 September 1901 and the Mullewa Road District on 11 August 1911.

The road district expanded to include the Cue and Day Dawn townships on 11 October 1912 through the Municipality of Cue and the Municipality of Day Dawn. It was renamed the Cue-Day Dawn Road District at that time.

It reverted to the Cue Road District name on 24 January 1930. It absorbed part of the abolished Nannine Road District on the same day.

On 1 July 1961, it became the Shire of Cue following the passage of the Local Government Act 1960, which reformed all remaining road districts into shires.

== Wards ==
The shire is divided into three wards:

- Cue Ward (5 councillors)
- Daydawn Ward (1 councillor)
- Tuckanarra Ward (1 councillor)

== Towns and localities ==
The towns and localities of the Shire of Cue with population and size figures based on the most recent Australian census:

Locality	Population	Area	Map
Cue	140 (SAL 2021)	94.1 km^{2} (36.3 sq mi)	
Lake Austin	0 (SAL 2021)	5,459.4 km^{2} (2,107.9 sq mi)	
Reedy	4 (SAL 2021)	3,477 km^{2} (1,342 sq mi)	
Weld Range	69 (SAL 2021)	4,547.8 km^{2} (1,755.9 sq mi)	

== Ghost towns ==
Abandoned, former and ghost towns in the Shire of Cue:

- Austin
- Big Bell
- Cuddingwarra
- Day Dawn
- Mainland
- Reedy
- Tuckanarra

== Notable councillors ==
- Con O'Brien, Cue Municipality councillor 1896–1900, mayor 1897–1900; later a state MP
- Richard Burt, Cue Road Board member 1939–1959, chairman 1950–1959; later a state MP
- Cedric Wyatt, Cue shire president early 2000s; Aboriginal leader

== Heritage-listed places ==
As of 2023, 127 places are heritage-listed in the Shire of Cue, of which 19 are on the State Register of Heritage Places, all but one, the Great Fingall Mine office, located in Cue.
