= Day Dawn, Western Australia =

Ghost town in Western Australia

Day Dawn
- Town
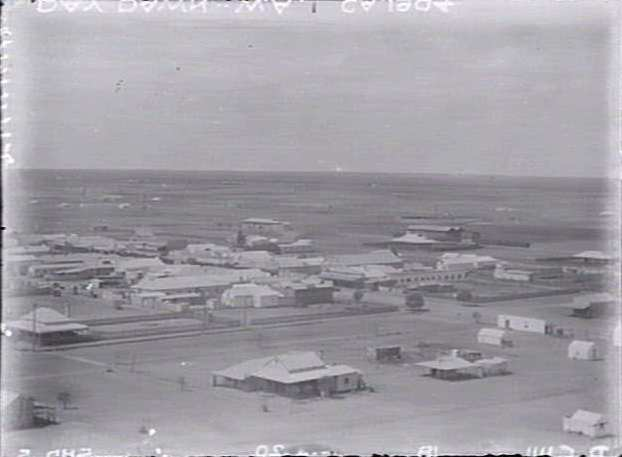
- Day Dawn in 1904.

- Interactive map of Day Dawn
- Coordinates: 27°28′00″S 117°52′00″E
- Country: Australia
- State: Western Australia
- LGA: Shire of Cue
- Location: 6.6 km (4.1 mi) from Cue
- Established: 1894

Government
  - State electorate: North West
  - Federal division: Durack

Population
  - Total: 0 (abandoned)

Day Dawn is a ghost town in the Mid West/upper Murchison region of Western Australia. It was a significant mining town and mine in the late nineteenth century. Located a short distance south-west of Cue, rich gold deposits were discovered there in 1891 by Ned Heffernan, who pegged out what became known as the 'Day Dawn Reef'.

Originally the settlement was informally called Four Mile, that being its distance from the town of Cue. It was gazetted as the town of Bundawadra on 2 March 1894, and renamed Day Dawn on 25 May 1894. It had its own municipality, the Municipality of Day Dawn, from 1894 to 1912.

The Mullewa–Meekatharra railway arrived at Cue from Mullewa, a distance of 317 kilometres (197 mi), in 1894.

In 1895 the Day Dawn Associated Gold mine, Kinsella, Trenton and the Day Dawn South mine were all operating ten head stamp mills close to the town for processing ore.

An important strike was staged there for nine weeks in 1899 when local miners protested against the use of Italian immigrant contract workers and Great Fingall's attempt to reduce miners' wages by five shillings per week.

A newspaper for the town, the Day Dawn Chronicle, launched in May 1902 and ran for about seven years.

Great Fingall Consolidated Gold Mining Company operated the mine from 1898 until 1918, when it was closed. By October 1921, shorings at the abandoned mine, which had been known as the 'Great Fingall mine', had collapsed and the town had disappeared altogether by the 1930s. All of the town's buildings are now in ruins with the exception of the Great Fingall Mine office, which is on state and federal heritage registers.

Various mining companies have operated the mine from the early 1990s using the open cut method and by reprocessing the tailings from past activities at the Big Bell gold processing plant. The last owners, Harmony Mining, have recently halted production and have sold the mine to Monarch Gold along with the Big Bell Mine and the Hill 50 Gold Mine at Mount Magnet. Monarch however was never able to pay off the mine and went into administration, returning Hill 50 to Harmony.

The area has a semi-arid climate with hot summers and mild to cool winters, but is prone to the occasional inundation, in 1925 several buildings in the town collapsed following heavy rain and flood waters. The town received 1.56 inches (40 mm) of rain over the course of two days.
