= Cue, Western Australia =

Cue
- Town
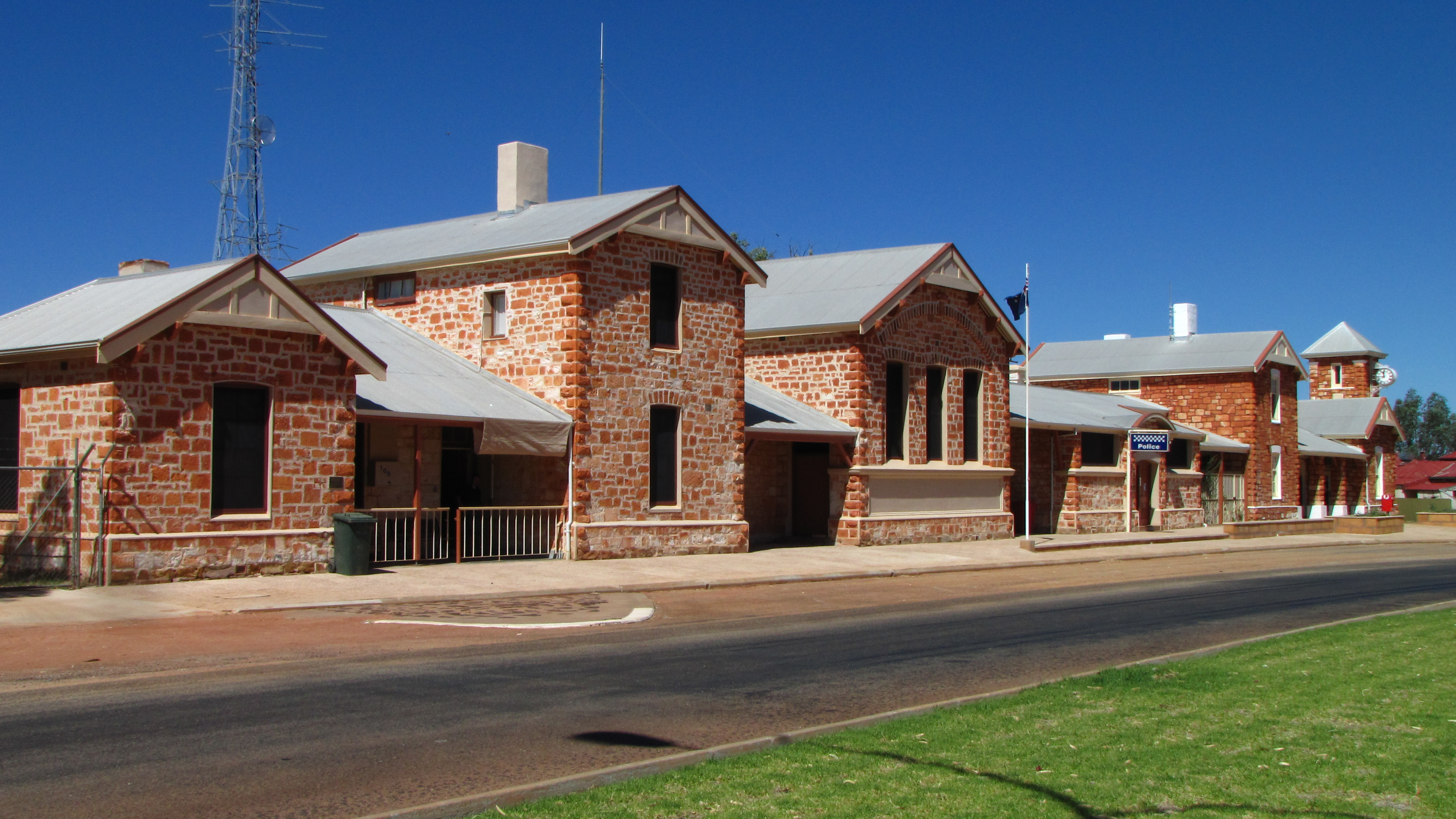
- The Cue police station

- Interactive map of Cue
- Coordinates: 27.421°S 117.896°E
- Country: Australia
- State: Western Australia
- LGA: Shire of Cue
- Location: 652 km (405 mi) NE of Perth; 420 km (260 mi) E of Geraldton; 118 km (73 mi) SW of Meekatharra; 80 km (50 mi) N of Mount Magnet; 5 km (3.1 mi) NE of Day Dawn
- Established: 1893

Government
  - State electorate: North West
  - Federal division: Durack

Area
  - Total: 94.1 km^{2} (36.3 sq mi)
- Elevation: 453 m (1,486 ft)

Population
  - Total: 135 (UCL 2021)
- Postcode: 6640
- Mean max temp: 28.4 °C (83.1 °F)
- Mean min temp: 14.7 °C (58.5 °F)
- Annual rainfall: 231.4 mm (9.11 in)

Cue is a small town in the Mid West region of Western Australia, located 620 km north-east of Perth. At the 2016 census, Cue had a population of 178. Cue is administered through the Cue Shire Council, which has its chambers in the historic Gentlemans Club building. The current president is Ross Pigdon. A Local Government Association biannual forum, better known as the "Cue Parliament" is held twice yearly in May and November.

== Overview and history ==
Gold was discovered in 1892 though there is uncertainty as to who made the first find. Michael Fitzgerald and Edward Heffernan collected 260 ounces after being given a nugget by an Aboriginal man known as "Governor". Tom Cue travelled to Nannine to register their claim. The townsite was gazetted in 1893 and named after Tom Cue.

In 1895 the town had 7 ten-head stamp mills operating around the town; these were the Cue Public Battery, Cue One Proprietary, Kangaroo, Lady Mary Amalgamated, Red, White and Blue, Rose of England, Reward and the Cue Victory.

The town's first water supply was a well in the centre of the main street; after an outbreak of typhoid fever, the well was capped with a rotunda built over the top. The water supply was replaced by another well dug near Lake Nallan; water was carted 20 km south to the townsite.

The town of Day Dawn, 8 km south, was established within a year; by 1900 a hospital and cemetery were established between the two towns and they had three newspapers operating. The rivalry between the towns fuelled a diverse sporting culture in the area. Cycling and horse-racing groups held regular events attracting competitors from as far away as Perth and Kalgoorlie.

Following heavy rains in 1913 the old Cue Battery Dam broke away from the force of the water pressure; the dam had only been repaired a few months earlier.

The township had its own dedicated municipality, the Municipality of Cue, from 1894 to 1912, when it amalgamated into the surrounding Cue Road District (now the Shire of Cue).

In a 2002 memoir, British businessman Alistair McAlpine (1942–2014) described passing through the town on his way back from viewing wildflowers at Collier Range National Park:

...your next stop should be Cue, a mining town caught in a time warp, its mines and buildings left almost as they were during the last century, and its wrought-iron bandstand still waiting for the band. After Cue, the weather changes: green trees, lush grass and running streams, white arum lilies along their banks. It is far easier to see Western Australia's wild flowers in King's Park, but not half as much fun..."

== Transportation ==
=== Railways ===
Cue was the terminus for the Northern Railway in 1898 until the route was extended to Meekatharra almost ten years later, and was also the junction for the branch line to Big Bell. The line closed in 1978.

=== Airport ===
Cue is served by Cue Airport.

== Population ==
By around 1900 Cue was the centre of the Murchison goldfields and boasted a population of about 10,000. As World War I drew men from the goldfields into the Australian Army the townsite of Day Dawn was abandoned. After the war many of the mines did not reopen and this started the decline of Cue as a major population centre. After the Great Depression and the fall in the price of gold, by 1933 the population of Cue had dropped to fewer than 500.

The current population is around 120; the major employer is Westgold but few employees actually live in the town, accessing a fly in/fly out roster. The Shire of Cue has ten employees and most other residents are self-employed as prospectors or government support workers. Cue was recently heritage listed as a town of significant historical value. The main street has changed little since it was first built. There are several buildings within the townsite that are icons in their own right.

== Some heritage places in Cue and Day Dawn ==
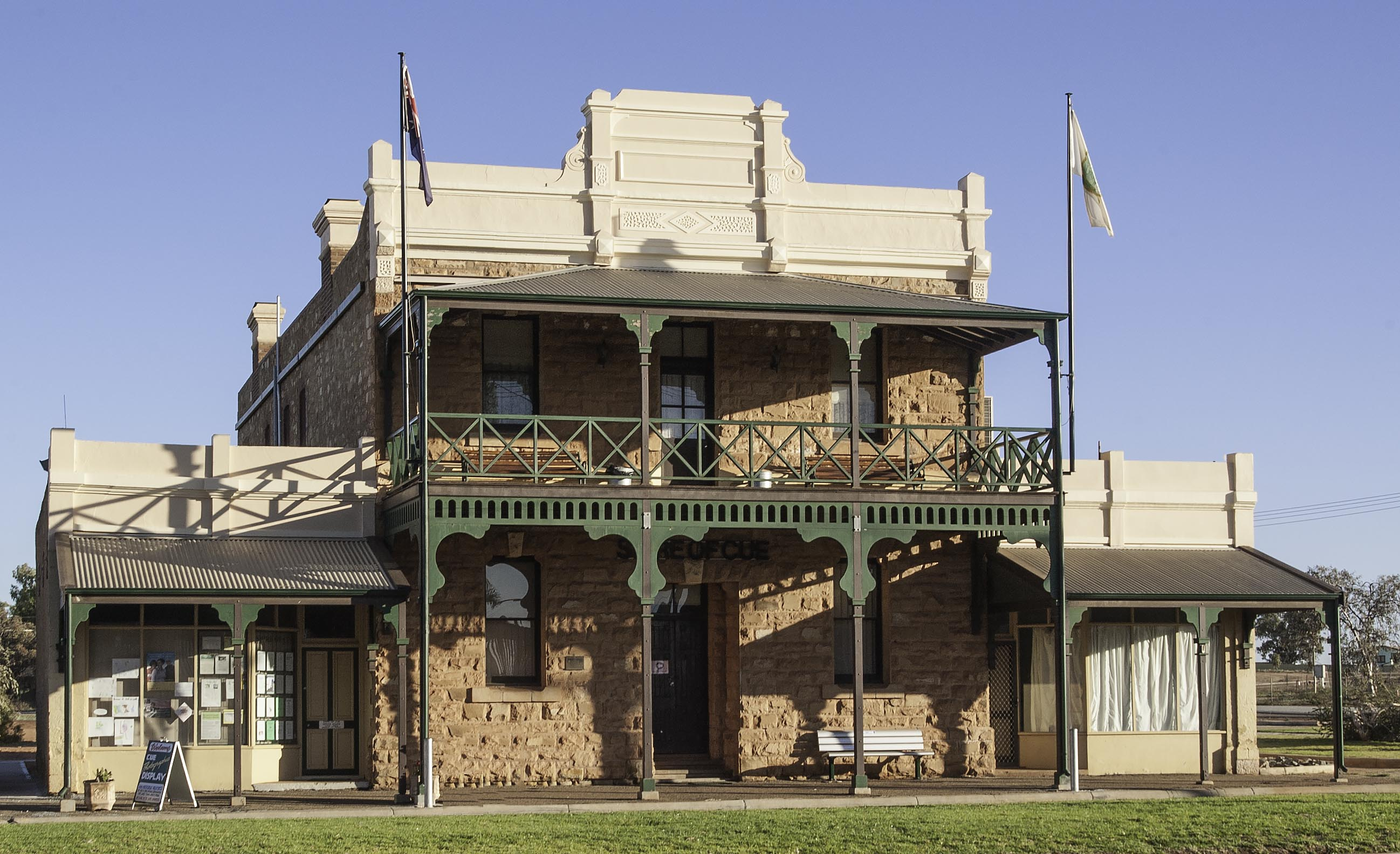
Cue Shire Offices

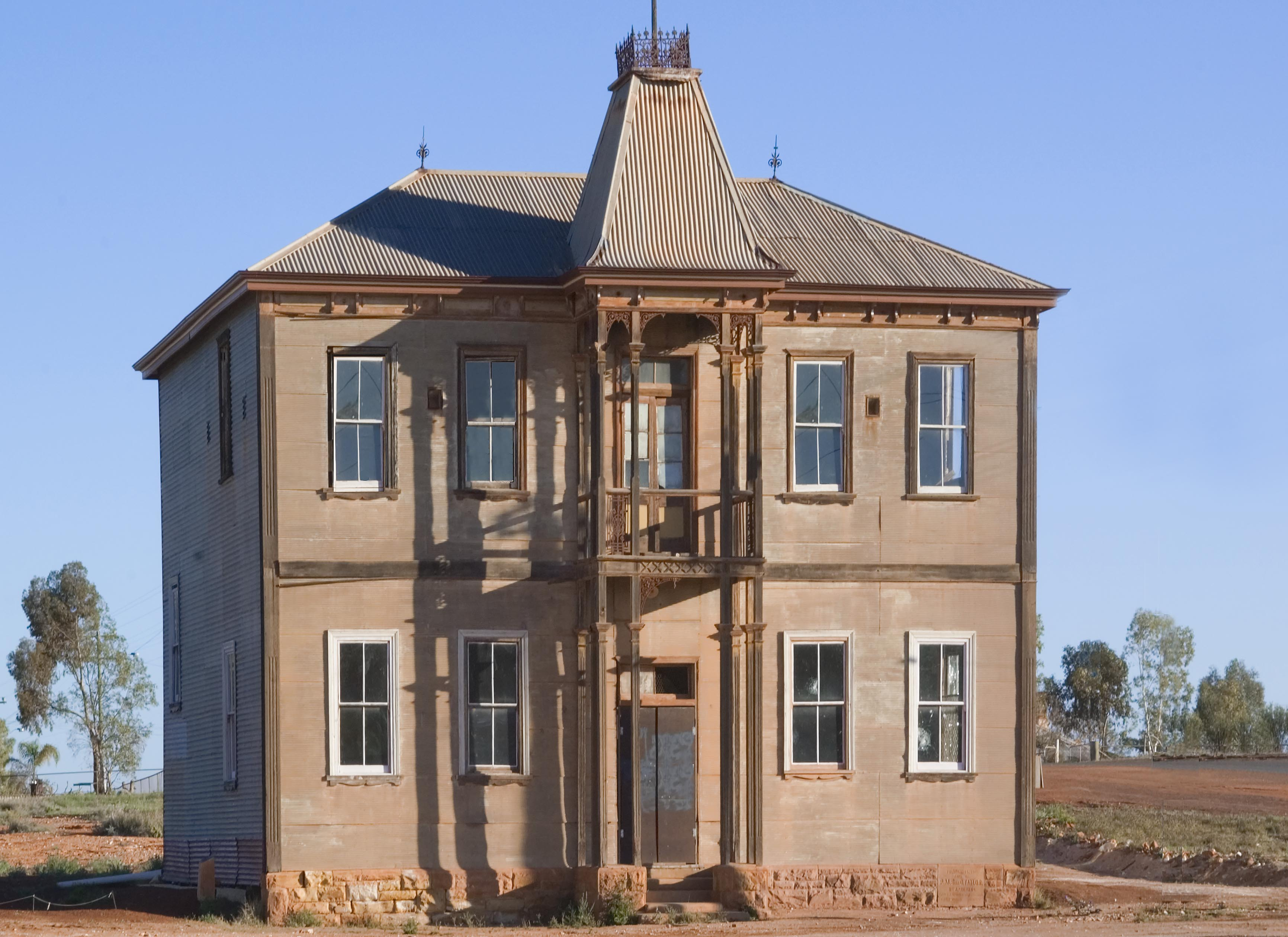
Former Masonic Lodge

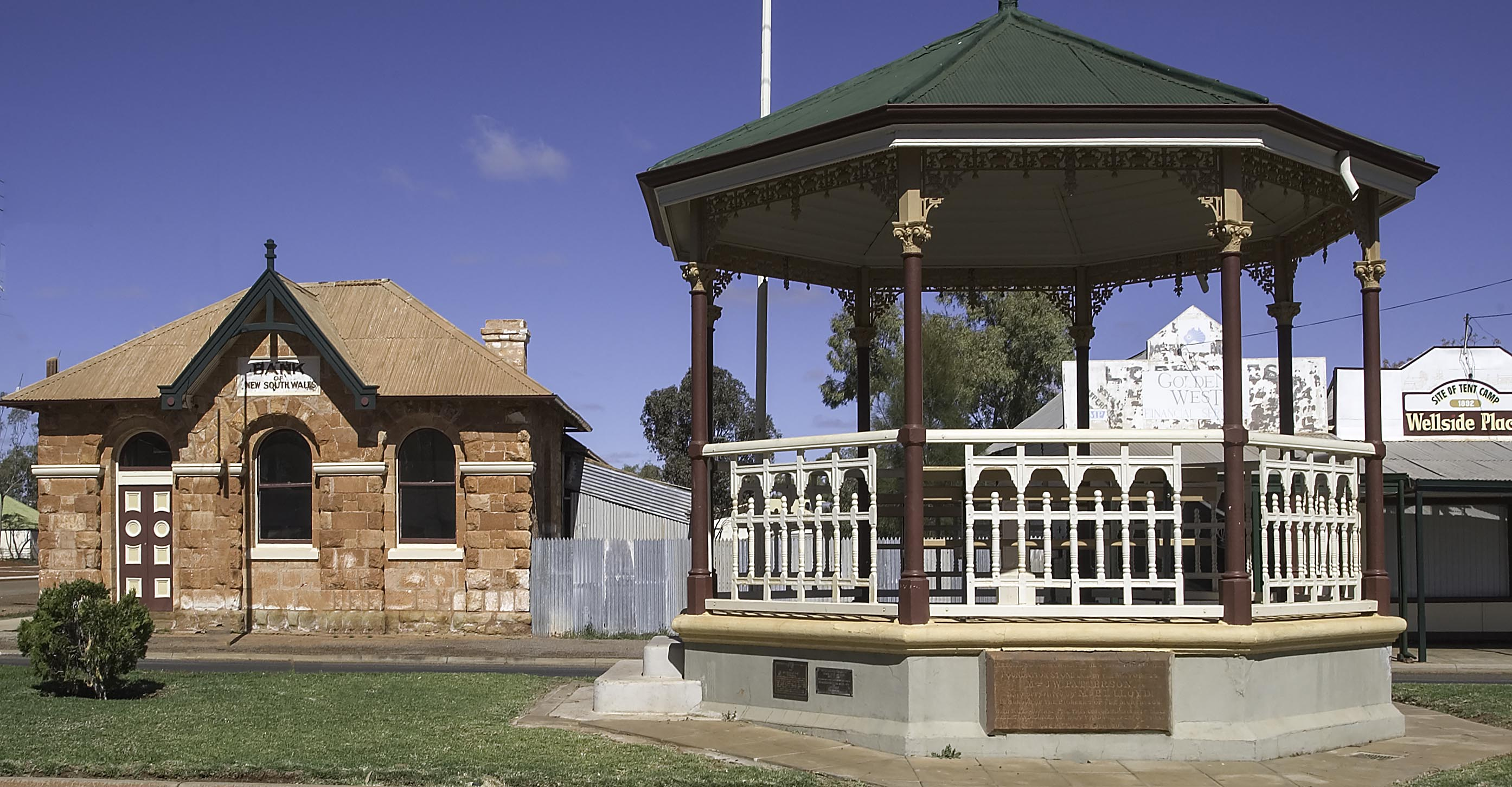
Rotunda and former bank

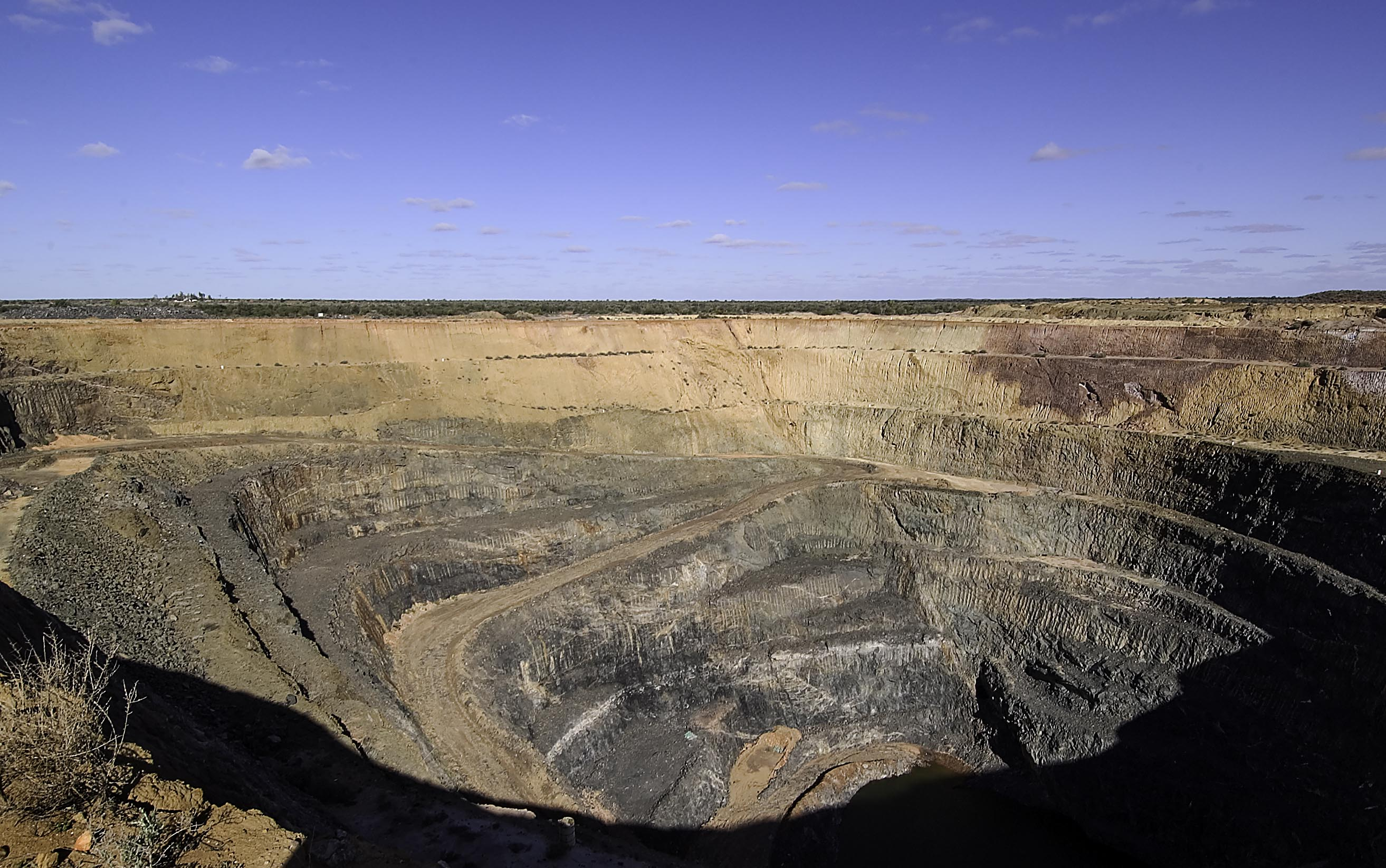
Day Dawn Great Fingal mine

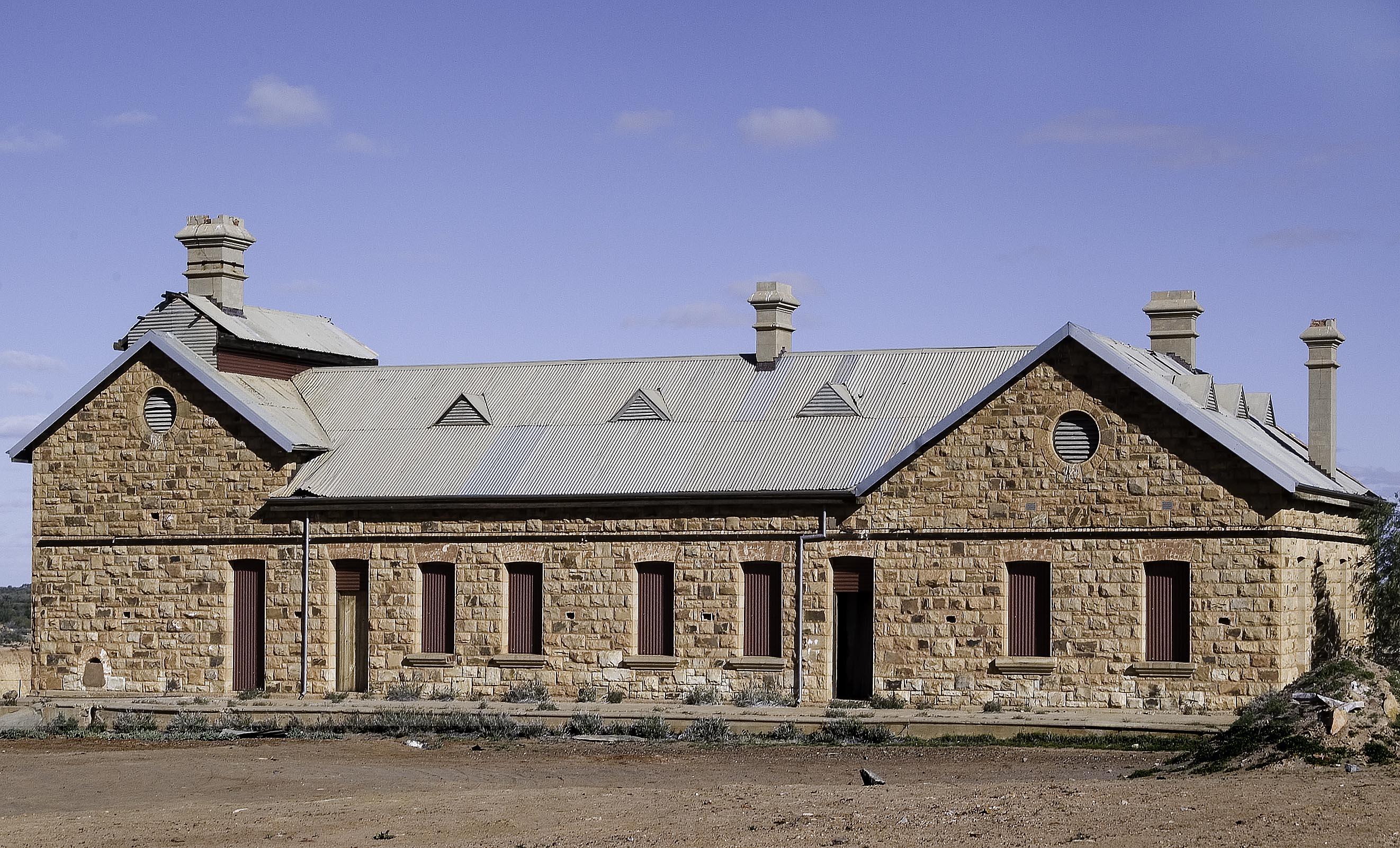
Day Dawn mine offices

== Climate ==
Cue has a semi-arid climate with hot summers and mild to cool winters.

The area is prone to the occasional inundation: In 1912 the area was struck by drought, followed by flooding in 1913 when the town received 2.19 inches (56 mm) of rain over the course of a day resulting in washaways and other storm damage. In 1925 several buildings in the town collapsed following heavy rain and flood waters. The town received 2.59 inches (66 mm) of rain over the course of two days.

Climate data for Cue
Month	Jan	Feb	Mar	Apr	May	Jun	Jul	Aug	Sep	Oct	Nov	Dec	Year
Record high °C (°F)	45.0 (113.0)	44.6 (112.3)	43.4 (110.1)	38.9 (102.0)	34.4 (93.9)	28.3 (82.9)	27.8 (82.0)	30.0 (86.0)	37.7 (99.9)	40.4 (104.7)	41.8 (107.2)	44.7 (112.5)	45.0 (113.0)
Mean daily maximum °C (°F)	37.8 (100.0)	36.7 (98.1)	34.0 (93.2)	29.0 (84.2)	23.2 (73.8)	19.1 (66.4)	18.4 (65.1)	20.4 (68.7)	24.6 (76.3)	28.3 (82.9)	32.8 (91.0)	36.2 (97.2)	28.4 (83.1)
Mean daily minimum °C (°F)	22.8 (73.0)	22.4 (72.3)	20.1 (68.2)	15.8 (60.4)	11.1 (52.0)	8.2 (46.8)	6.9 (44.4)	7.7 (45.9)	10.1 (50.2)	13.1 (55.6)	17.2 (63.0)	20.7 (69.3)	14.7 (58.5)
Record low °C (°F)	11.3 (52.3)	8.0 (46.4)	8.1 (46.6)	3.8 (38.8)	0.7 (33.3)	0.4 (32.7)	−0.5 (31.1)	−0.5 (31.1)	2.1 (35.8)	3.8 (38.8)	6.7 (44.1)	11.3 (52.3)	−0.5 (31.1)
Average precipitation mm (inches)	26.6 (1.05)	30.0 (1.18)	23.4 (0.92)	19.4 (0.76)	25.0 (0.98)	28.3 (1.11)	26.1 (1.03)	17.2 (0.68)	6.9 (0.27)	6.6 (0.26)	9.0 (0.35)	14.7 (0.58)	233.2 (9.18)
Average precipitation days	3.0	3.5	3.3	3.3	4.5	6.0	5.8	4.4	2.1	1.8	1.8	2.5	42.0
