= Sandstone (disambiguation) =

Sandstone is a sedimentary rock composed mainly of sand-size mineral or rock grains.

Sandstone may also refer to:

== Place names ==
=== Australia ===
- Sandstone, Western Australia
  - Sandstone Gold Mine, a gold mine in Western Australia.
- Shire of Sandstone, Western Australia

=== Canada ===
- Calgary, colloquially known as the "Sandstone City"
  - Sandstone Valley, Calgary

=== United States ===
- Sandstone Charter Township, Michigan
- Sandstone, Minnesota
- Sandstone Township, Pine County, Minnesota
- Sandstone, Missouri
- Sandstone, West Virginia
- Sandstone Bluff, Wisconsin

== Other uses ==
- Sandstone Amphitheater, outdoor theater in Kansas City, Kansas
- Sandstone Estates, agricultural enterprise and a technology museum in South Africa
- Sandstone Ranch (Nevada), historic place in Clark County, Nevada
- Sandstone Retreat, 1970s clothing-optional, open sexuality resort in California
- Sandstone Trail, a long-distance walkers' path in England
- Sandstone Universities, an informally defined group comprising Australia's oldest tertiary education institutions
- Operation Sandstone was the third series of American nuclear weapon tests in 1948
- Sandstone (2004), the first novel in James Rollins' SIGMA Force Series
- Sandstone (company), a private intelligence firm

== See also ==
- Sandstone Solar Energy Project, a planned solar power plant in Nevada, United States
