= Youanmi Downs =

Pastoral lease in Western Australia

Coordinates: 28.556°S 118.815°E

Location in Western Australia

Youanmi Downs or Youanmi Downs Station is a pastoral lease that once operated as a cattle station. It is located about 78 kilometres (48 mi) south west of Sandstone and 109 kilometres (68 mi) south east of Mount Magnet in the Mid West region of Western Australia. The eastern boundary of the station adjoins Yuinmery and the southern boundary adjoins Lake Barlee Station.

Prospector Tom Payne discovered gold in the area in 1896 and it was named Youanmi shortly afterwards. By 1912 Sandstone had a population of 8,000 and Youanmi had a population of 300. The first pastoral lease were being established at this time.

The property was established prior to 1917, the same year in which the property was supporting a herd of several hundred cattle. Otherwise the surrounding area was principally a gold mining centre with the Youanmi Gold Mine being the largest of the mines operating in the vicinity. By 1927 the property was running sheep and producing wool.

Youanmi and neighbouring Youangarra Station were placed up for sale together in 1953 for £32,000. Together the properties occupied an area of 578,000 acres (233,908 ha), of which most had been improved. Two homesteads and shearing sheds were included along with a flock of 9,000 sheep.

== See also ==
- List of ranches and stations
