= List of State Register of Heritage Places in the Shire of Sandstone =

List of heritage sites in Western Australia

The State Register of Heritage Places is maintained by the Heritage Council of Western Australia. As of 2026, 53 places are heritage-listed in the Shire of Sandstone, of which three are on the State Register of Heritage Places.

== List ==
The Western Australian State Register of Heritage Places, as of 2026, lists the following three state registered places within the Shire of Sandstone:

Place name	Place #	Street number	Street name	Suburb or town	Co-ordinates	Notes & former names	Photo
Black Range Church, Sandstone	2356	Corner	Oroya & Thaduna Streets	Sandstone	27.987814°S 119.30034°E	St Athanasius Roman Catholic Church	
State Battery (former), Sandstone	9124		6 km south-east of Sandstone	Sandstone	28.041103°S 119.304698°E	Located on the Menzies-Sandstone Road	
Camel Station, Sandstone	25841		Dromedary Hills	Sandstone	29.043052°S 118.44827°E	Located 10 km east of intersection Narndee-Red Bluff Road and Paynes Find-Sandstone Road, on the western side of the Rabbit Proof Fence	
