= Acacia burrowsiana =

Conservation status
- Priority Three — Poorly Known Taxa (DEC)

Scientific classification
- Kingdom: Plantae
- Clade: Tracheophytes
- Clade: Angiosperms
- Clade: Eudicots
- Clade: Rosids
- Order: Fabales
- Family: Fabaceae
- Subfamily: Caesalpinioideae
- Clade: Mimosoid clade
- Genus: Acacia
- Species: A. burrowsiana

Binomial name
- Acacia burrowsiana Maslin
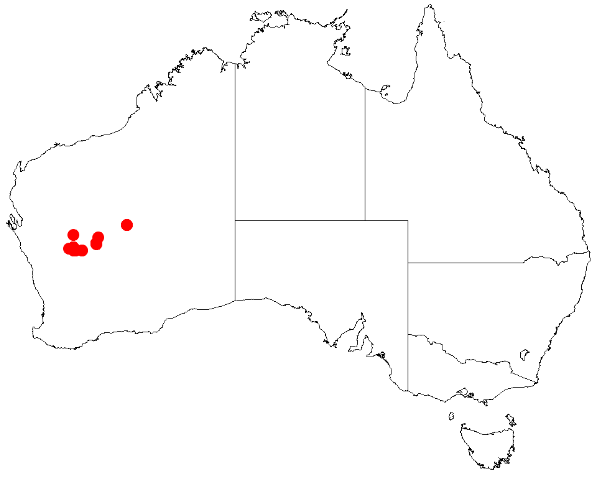
- Occurrence data from AVH

Species of legume

Acacia burrowsiana, also known as Burrows’ snakewood or gizzard wattle, is a species of flowering plant in the family Fabaceae and is endemic to inland Western Australia. It is a shrub or tree with erect, narrowly linear to lance-shaped or elliptic phyllodes, one or two spikes of flowers arranged the axils of phyllodes, and curved to s-shaped or twisted pods appearing like a string of beads.

== Description ==
Acacia burrowsiana is a gnarled shrub or tree that typically grows to a height of 2–5 m (6 ft 7 in – 16 ft 5 in) with two to four slightly twisted main trunks and a dense crown 3–7 m (9.8–23.0 ft) wide. The bark is grey and fissured on the trunks and main branches, but smooth on the upper branches. The phyllodes are erected, leathery narrowly linear to lance-shaped or elliptic, 70–130 mm (2.8–5.1 in) long and mostly 3–5 mm (0.12–0.20 in) wide with many indistinct, longitudinal, parallel veins. There are three or four glands along the upper edges of the phyllodes. The flowers are borne on one or two spikes 10–20 mm (0.39–0.79 in) long in the axils of phyllodes on peduncles 2–7 mm (0.079–0.276 in) long. Flowering occurs between October and November and the seed pods resemble a string of beads, s-shaped or twisted, thinly crust-like, 50–130 mm (2.0–5.1 in) long and 5–7 mm (0.20–0.28 in) wide. The seeds are brown to more or less blackish, elliptic to widely elliptic, 6–7 mm (0.24–0.28 in) long.

== Taxonomy ==
Acacia burrowsiana was first formally described in 2007 by Bruce Maslin in the journal Nuytsia from specimens collected near Mount Magnet in 1994. The specific epithet (burrowsiana) honours Neil Burrows, who worked in the Department of Environment and Conservation (Western Australia).

== Distribution and habitat ==
Burrows’ snakewood has a discontinuous distribution but mostly confined to the Murchison and Gascoyne bioregions where it grows in loam on plains with quartz and ironstone rubble, sometimes near winter-wet watercourses, near Mount Magnet, Sandstone, Cue and Wiluna.

== Conservation status ==
Acacia burrowsiana is listed as "Priority Three" by the Government of Western Australia Department of Biodiversity, Conservation and Attractions, meaning that it is poorly known and known from only a few locations but is not under imminent threat.

== See also ==
- List of Acacia species
