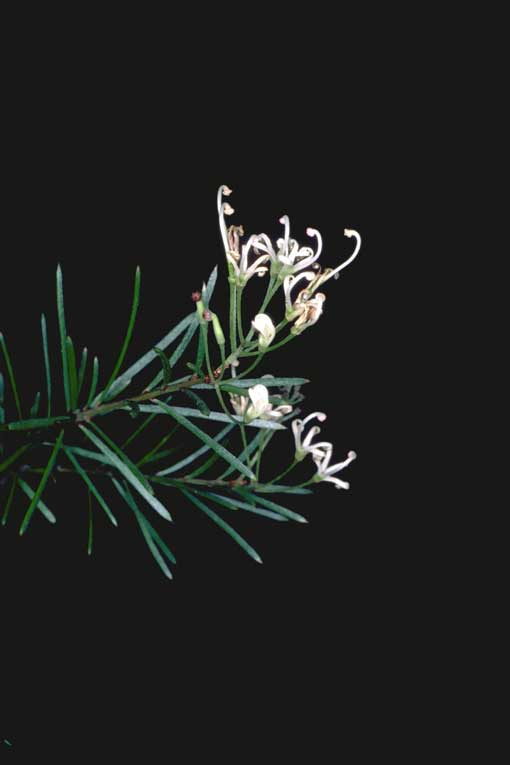
- In the Australian National Botanic Gardens

Conservation status
- Least Concern (IUCN 3.1)

- Priority Four — Rare Taxa (DEC)

Scientific classification
- Kingdom: Plantae
- Clade: Embryophytes
- Clade: Tracheophytes
- Clade: Angiosperms
- Clade: Eudicots
- Order: Proteales
- Family: Proteaceae
- Genus: Grevillea
- Species: G. inconspicua

Binomial name
- Grevillea inconspicua Diels

= Grevillea inconspicua =

Species of shrub endemic to Western Australia

Grevillea inconspicua, commonly known as Cue grevillea, is a species of flowering plant in the family Proteaceae and is endemic to the central-west of Western Australia. It is a prickly, densely-branched shrub with linear leaves and clusters of off-white to silvery grey flowers.

== Description ==
Grevillea inconspicua is a prickly, densely-branched shrub that typically grows to a height of 0.6–1 m (2 ft 0 in – 3 ft 3 in) and has a wiry branches. The leaves are linear, 10–50 mm (0.39–1.97 in) long and 0.8–1.3 mm (0.031–0.051 in) wide with the edges rolled under, enclosing the lower surface. The flowers are arranged in clusters of six to eight on the ends of branches and are off-white to silvery-grey, the pistil 9.5–11.5 mm (0.37–0.45 in) long with a white to pale pink style. Flowering occurs from June to September and the fruit is a follicle 7–14 mm (0.28–0.55 in) long.

== Taxonomy ==
Grevillea inconspicua was first formally described in 1904 by Ludwig Diels in Ernst Georg Pritzel's Botanische Jahrbücher für Systematik, Pflanzengeschichte und Pflanzengeographie. The specific epithet (inconspicua) means "undistinguished", referring to the flowers.

== Distribution and habitat ==
Cue grevillea occurs in the central-west area of Western Australia near Cue, Meekatharra the Weld Range and Sandstone, where it grows in shrub communities often along drainage lines and gullies.

== Conservation status ==
Grevillea inconspicua is listed as Least Concern on the IUCN Red List of Threatened Species. It is also listed as Declared Rare and Priority Flora List by the Government of Western Australia Department of Biodiversity, Conservation and Attractions, meaning that it is rare or near threatened.

== Use in horticulture ==
The shrub is suitable for use in a water wise garden, although it is not showy, it can take full sun and well drained soils are recommended.

== See also ==
- List of Grevillea species
