= Pimelea subvillifera =

Scientific classification
- Kingdom: Plantae
- Clade: Tracheophytes
- Clade: Angiosperms
- Clade: Eudicots
- Clade: Rosids
- Order: Malvales
- Family: Thymelaeaceae
- Genus: Pimelea
- Species: P. subvillifera

Binomial name
- Pimelea subvillifera (Threlfall) Rye

Synonyms
- Pimelea octophylla subsp. subvillifera Threlfall; Pimelea villifera auct. non Meisn.: Black, J.M. (December 1926); Pimelea villifera auct. non Meisn.: Black, J.M. (1952)

Species of shrub

Pimelea subvillifera is a species of flowering plant in the family Thymelaeaceae and is native to the south-west of Western Australia and to South Australia. It is usually an erect shrub and has elliptic leaves and heads of white flowers surrounded by 8 to 18 narrowly egg-shaped involucral bracts.

== Description ==
Pimelea subvillifera is usually an erect shrub that typically grows to a height of 15–60 cm (5.9–23.6 in) and has hairy young stems. The leaves are arranged alternately along the stems, elliptic or narrowly elliptic, 2–8 mm (0.079–0.315 in) long and 0.8–3 mm (0.031–0.118 in) wide on a short petiole. Both surfaces of the leaves are densely hairy, the hairs on the upper surface longer than those on the lower surface. The flowers are densely hairy on the outside, bisexual or female, and white, surrounded by 8 to 18 narrowly egg-shaped to almost linear, involucral bracts 4–10 mm (0.16–0.39 in) long and 1–2 mm (0.039–0.079 in) wide. The flower tube is 5–9.5 mm (0.20–0.37 in) long, the sepals 1.5–3.0 mm (0.059–0.118 in) long, and the stamens are usually shorter than the sepals. Flowering occurs from September to November.

== Taxonomy ==
Pimelea subvillifera was first formally described in 1983 by S. Threlfall, who gave it the name Pimelea octophylla subsp. subvillifera in the journal Brunonia. In 1988, Barbara Lynette Rye raised the subspecies to species status as Pimelea subvillifera in the journal Nuytsia. The specific epithet (subvillifera) means "bearing somewhat shaggy hairs".

== Distribution and habitat ==
This pimelea grows on sandplains and rocky hillside from near Sandstone to near Norseman in the Coolgardie, Esperance Plains, Great Victoria Desert, Murchison and Yalgoo bioregions of Western Australia, and on the Eyre Peninsula of South Australia.

== Conservation status ==
Pimelea subvillifera is listed as "not threatened" by the Government of Western Australia Department of Biodiversity, Conservation and Attractions.
