= Acacia masliniana =

Maslin's wattle

Scientific classification
- Kingdom: Plantae
- Clade: Tracheophytes
- Clade: Angiosperms
- Clade: Eudicots
- Clade: Rosids
- Order: Fabales
- Family: Fabaceae
- Subfamily: Caesalpinioideae
- Clade: Mimosoid clade
- Genus: Acacia
- Species: A. masliniana

Binomial name
- Acacia masliniana R.S.Cowan
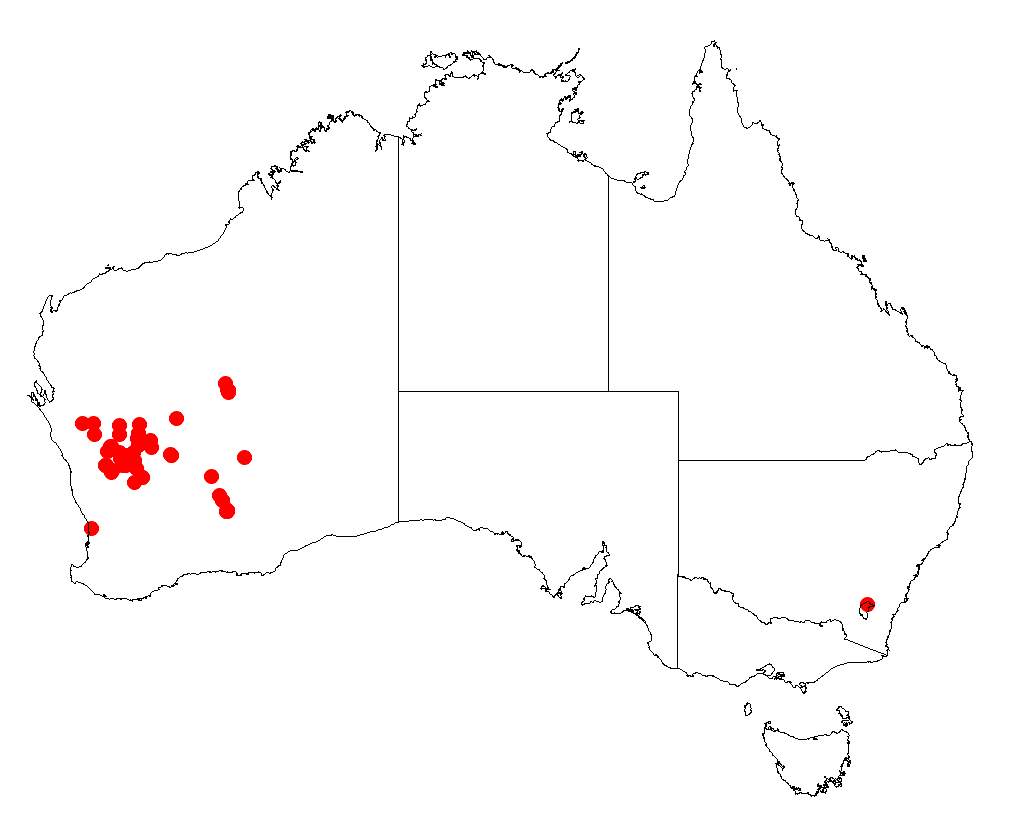

Synonyms
- Racosperma maslinianum (R.S.Cowan) Pedley

Species of legume

Acacia masliniana, commonly known as Maslin's wattle is a species of flowering plant in the family Fabaceae and is endemic to arid parts of Western Australia. It is a shrub or tree with somewhat gnarled trunks and branches, grey, fibrous bark, and branches that are covered with soft hairs at first. The phyllodes are terete with a sharply pointed, tapered tip, spherical heads of golden yellow flowers, and linear, leathery pods raised over the seeds.

== Description ==
Acacia masliniana is a shrub or tree that typically grows to a height of 1–3 m (3 ft 3 in – 9 ft 10 in) and has somewhat gnarled trunks and branches, grey fibrous bark, The branchelets are terete, covered with soft hairs pressed against the surface on the extremeties at first, soon glabrous. The phyllodes are ascending to erect, terete, straight to slightly curved, 500–95 mm (19.7–3.7 in) long, about 1.3 mm (0.051 in) in diameter with a rigid, tapered tip. There is a gland 1.5–5 mm (0.059–0.197 in) above the base of the phyllode. The flowers are borne in two spherical heads in axils on peduncles 0.5–3 mm (0.020–0.118 in) long, each head with 30 to 45 golden yellow flowers. Flowering occurs from July to September, and the pods are linear, up to 100 mm (3.9 in) long, 3–4.5 mm (0.12–0.18 in) wide, leathery and raised over the seeds. The seeds are elliptic, 4.5–5 mm (0.18–0.20 in) long, glossy brown with a bright yellow aril on the end.

== Taxonomy ==
Acacia masliniana. was first formally described in 1998 by Richard Cowan in the journal Nuytsia from specimens collected by Bruce Maslin between Ninghan Station and Fields Find in 1976. The specific epithet (masliniana) honours the collector of the type specimens, the author noting "it is entirely appropriate that an Acacia species should bear the name of one of the most active and authoritative specialists on the taxonomy of the genus".

== Distribution and habitat ==
Maslin's wattle grows around the margins of marshes and saline lakes and on flats in clay or loamy soils in open scrub, mostly in an area bounded by Twin Peaks, Cue, Perenjori and Youanmi with outlying populations found in the Kalgoorlie–Kambalda area.

== See also ==
- List of Acacia species
