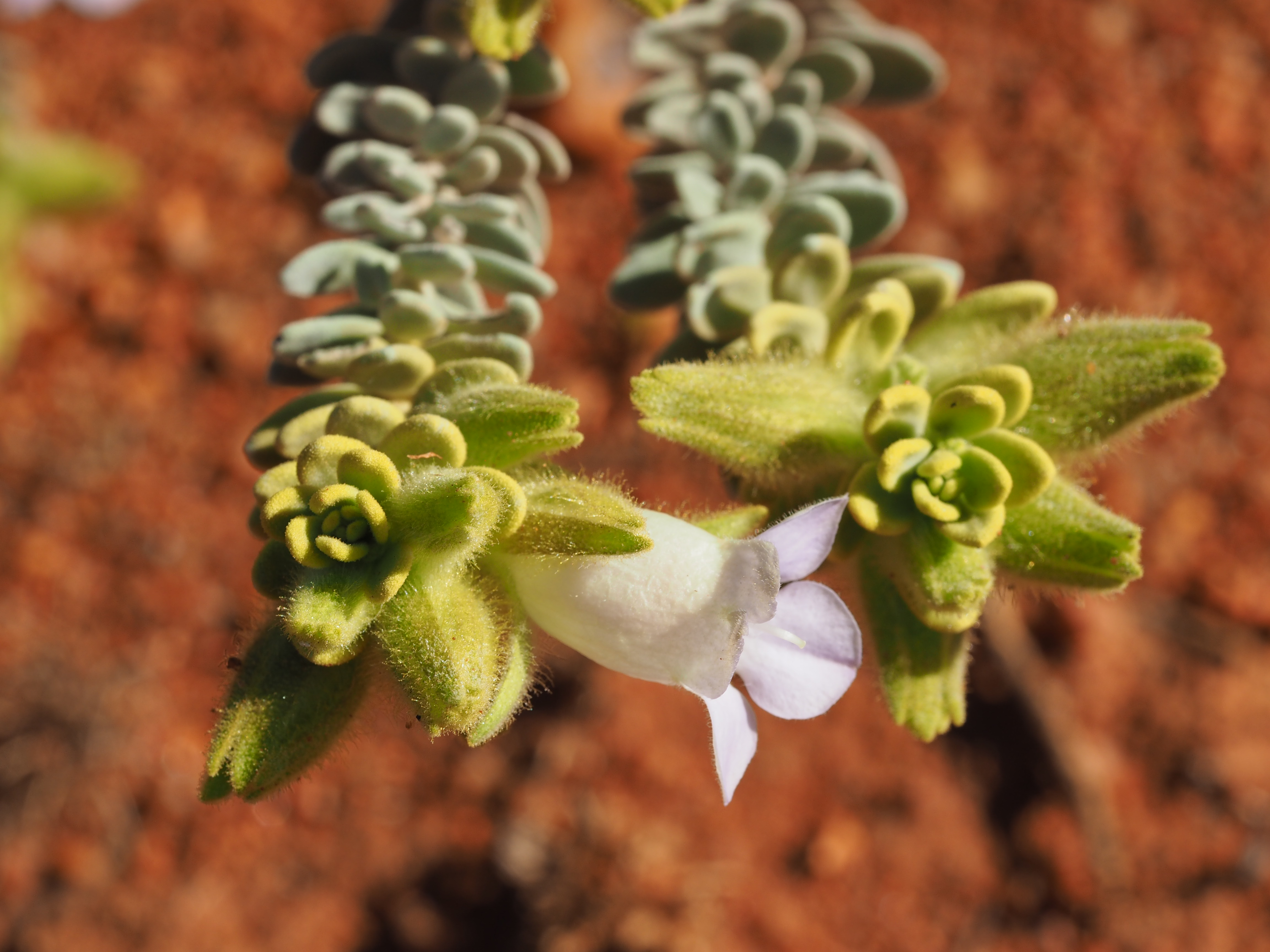
- Leaves and flower

Scientific classification
- Kingdom: Plantae
- Clade: Tracheophytes
- Clade: Angiosperms
- Clade: Eudicots
- Clade: Asterids
- Order: Lamiales
- Family: Scrophulariaceae
- Genus: Eremophila
- Species: E. jucunda Chinnock
- Subspecies: E. j. subsp. jucunda

Trinomial name
- Eremophila jucunda subsp. jucunda

= Eremophila jucunda subsp. jucunda =

Subspecies of plant endemic to Western Australia

Eremophila jucunda subsp. jucunda is a plant in the figwort family, Scrophulariaceae and is endemic to Western Australia. It is a small shrub with hairy leaves and white to violet flowers often growing on stony hillsides. It is similar to subspecies pulcherrima but is distinguished from it by its yellow new growth and more southerly distribution.

== Description ==
Eremophila jucunda subsp. jucunda is a shrub which usually grows to a height of 0.2–1 metre (0.7–3 ft). The stems and branches are hairy and the leaves are densely arranged near the ends of branches, lance-shaped to egg-shaped, 8–20 millimetres (0.3–0.8 in) long and 2–6 millimetres (0.08–0.2 in) wide. The young leaves and branches are bright yellow.

The flowers are white or lilac to purple and occur singly in the leaf axils on flower stalks 3–9 millimetres (0.1–0.4 in) long. There are 5 sepals which are linear to lance-shaped, 9–17 millimetres (0.4–0.7 in) long and 1–3 millimetres (0.04–0.1 in) wide. The 5 petals form a tube 17–29 millimetres (0.7–1 in) which is more or less hairy on the outer surface. Flowering occurs from July to September and is followed by fruit which are oval to cone-shaped and 5–9 millimetres (0.2–0.4 in) long.

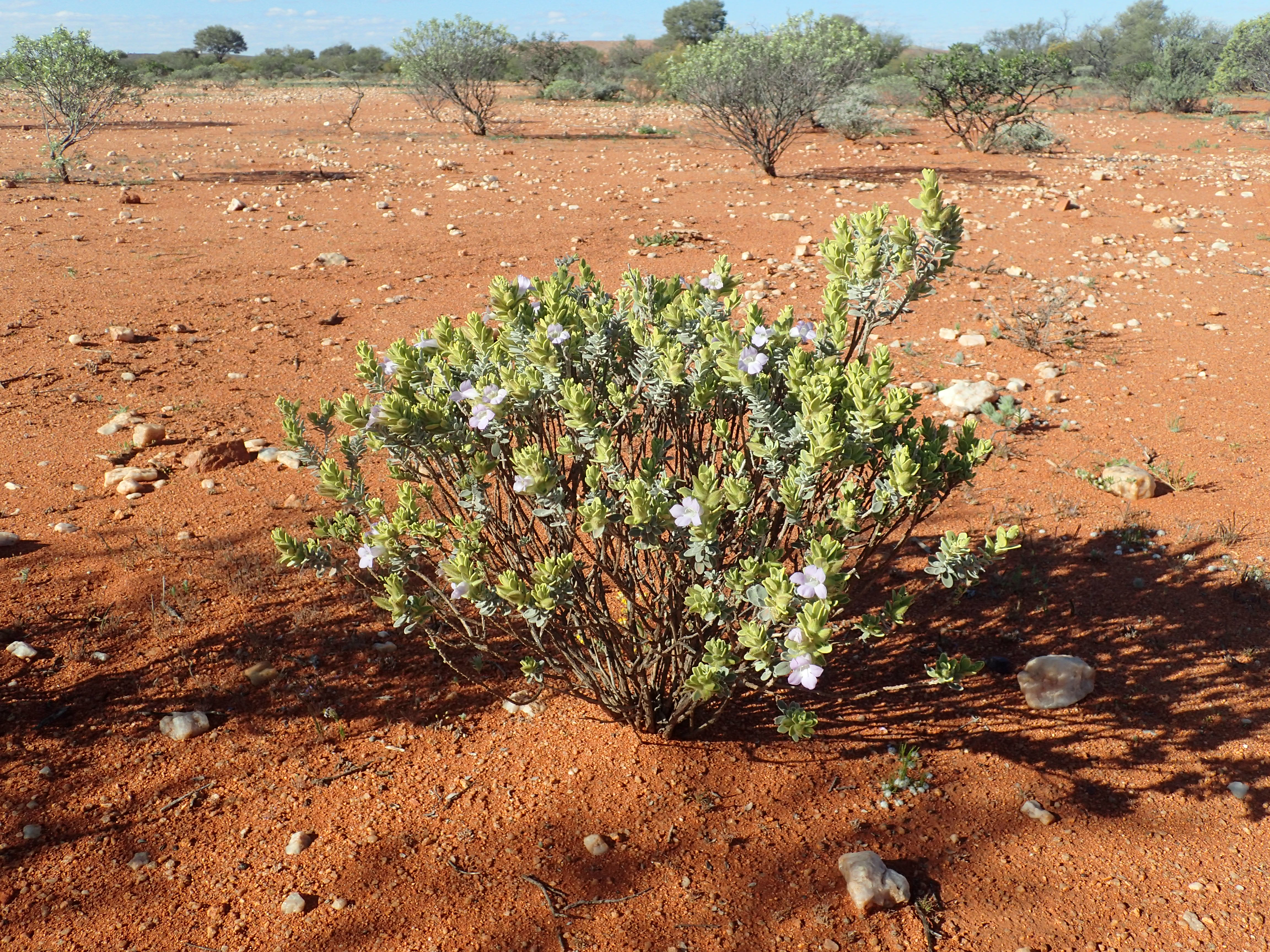
About 55 km (34 mi) east of Meekatharra

== Taxonomy and naming ==
Eremophila jucunda subsp. jucunda is an autonym and therefore the taxonomy is the same as for Eremophila jucunda.

== Distribution and habitat ==
Eremophila jucunda subsp. jucunda grows on stony flats or hillsides, often in mulga woodland. It occurs in a broad area between Sandstone and Mount Vernon.

== Conservation ==
Eremophila jucunda subspecies jucunda is classified as "not threatened" by the Western Australian Government Department of Parks and Wildlife.
