= Calytrix hislopii =

Conservation status
- Priority Three — Poorly Known Taxa (DEC)

Scientific classification
- Kingdom: Plantae
- Clade: Embryophytes
- Clade: Tracheophytes
- Clade: Spermatophytes
- Clade: Angiosperms
- Clade: Eudicots
- Clade: Rosids
- Order: Myrtales
- Family: Myrtaceae
- Genus: Calytrix
- Species: C. hislopii

Binomial name
- Calytrix hislopii Rye

Species of flowering plant

Calytrix hislopii is a species of flowering plant in the myrtle family Myrtaceae and is endemic to inland regions of Western Australia. It has been described as a "squat, gnarled sub shrub" with narrowly elliptic to linear leaves and yellow flowers with about 25 to 40 stamens in several rows.

== Description ==
Calytrix hislopii has been described in one location as a "squat, gnarled sub shrub" that typically grows to a height of up to 0.1–1 m (3.9 in – 3 ft 3.4 in) and has glabrous young stems. Its leaves are elliptic to linear, 4–7 mm (0.16–0.28 in) long, 0.7–1.2 mm (0.028–0.047 in) wide on a petiole 0.8–1.2 mm (0.031–0.047 in) long. There are no stipules. The flowers are borne on a peduncle 1.0–1.5 mm (0.039–0.059 in) long with bracteoles 6–7 mm (0.24–0.28 in) long and joined at the base for 1.5–2.5 mm (0.059–0.098 in) long. The floral tube is free from the style, 6–9 mm (0.24–0.35 in) and has five ribs. The sepals are 11–14 mm (0.43–0.55 in) long with an awn 7–9 mm (0.28–0.35 in) long. The petals are yellow, 6.0–7.5 mm (0.24–0.30 in) long and there are about 25 to 40 stamens in several rows. Flowering has been observed in August and September.

== Taxonomy ==
Calytrix hislopii was first formally described in 2013 by Barbara Lynette Rye in the journal Nuytsia from specimens collected north of Sandstone in 2005. The specific epithet (hislopii) honours Michael Hislop "for his exceptional ability to identify species in all families of the Western Australian flora".

== Distribution and habitat ==
This species of Calytrix grows on a laterite ridge, on a breakaway and on granite near Sandstone, Laverton and Leonora in the Coolgardie, Great Victoria Desert, Murchison and Yalgoo bioregions of inland Western Australia.

== Conservation status ==
Calytrix hislopii is listed as "Priority Three" by the Government of Western Australia Department of Biodiversity, Conservation and Attractions meaning that it is poorly known and known from only a few locations but is not under imminent threat.
