= Yuinmery =

Pastoral lease in Western Australia

Coordinates: 28.561°S 119.017°E

Location in Western Australia

Yuinmery Station is a pastoral lease that once operated as a sheep station and currently operates as a cattle station. It is located about 69 kilometres (43 mi) south west of Sandstone and 127 kilometres (79 mi) south east of Mount Magnet in the Mid West region of Western Australia. The western boundary of the station adjoins Youanmi Downs and the southern boundary adjoins vacant crown land and Cashmere Downs Station.

Yuinmery was taken up in 1917 by William Gerald Lefroy, who moved from Carramarra, Moora, and has remained in the Lefroy family ever since. Originally the station ran sheep, producing wool, however the increased incidence of wild dogs meant that the property was converted to cattle in the 21st century.

The property occupies an area of 124,925 hectares (308,696 acres) and contains large areas of quality lake country for grazing. Yuinnmery has a near new four bedroom two bathroom homestead and separate cottage. The station has 35 watering points and a carrying capacity of 9,110 sheep or 1,300 head of cattle. When last advertised the property was stocked with 120 head of Shorthorn and Brahman heifers and was priced at A$720,000.

A minute bat named Vespadelus baverstocki, a desert inhabiting insectivore, was first described using a specimen shot at this location.

== See also ==
- List of ranches and stations
