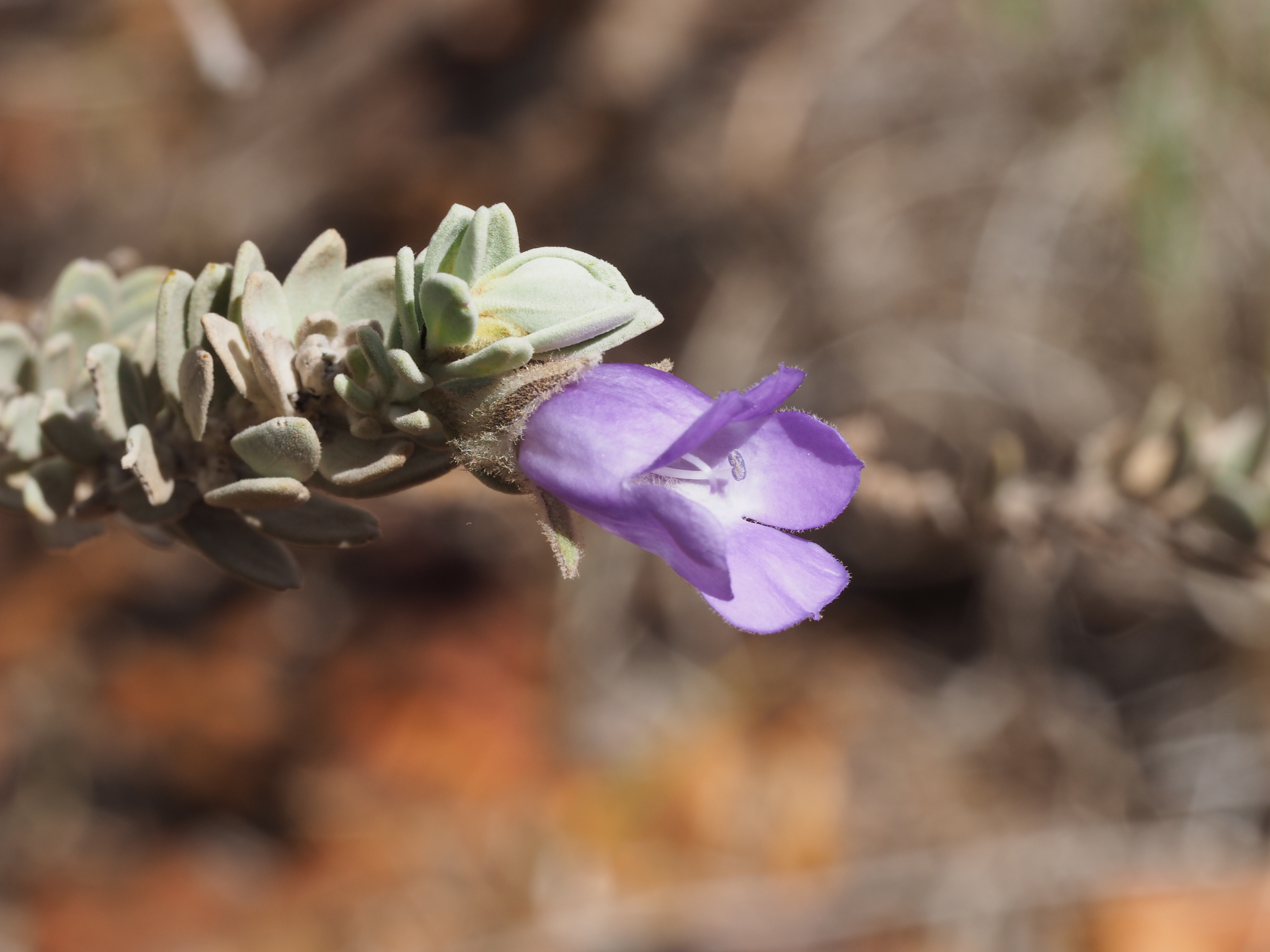
- Leaves and flower

Scientific classification
- Kingdom: Plantae
- Clade: Tracheophytes
- Clade: Angiosperms
- Clade: Eudicots
- Clade: Asterids
- Order: Lamiales
- Family: Scrophulariaceae
- Genus: Eremophila
- Species: E. jucunda
- Subspecies: E. j. subsp. pulcherrima

Trinomial name
- Eremophila jucunda subsp. pulcherrima Chinnock

= Eremophila jucunda subsp. pulcherrima =

Subspecies of flowering plant

Eremophila jucunda subsp. pulcherrima is a plant in the figwort family, Scrophulariaceae and is endemic to Western Australia. It is a small shrub with grey, hairy leaves and sepals and blue or mauve flowers often growing in stony places. It is similar to subspecies jucunda but is distinguished from it by its grey new growth and more northerly distribution.

== Description ==
Eremophila jucunda subsp. pulcherrima is a shrub which usually grows to a height of 0.2–1 metre (0.7–3 ft). Its branches and leaves are hairy and the leaves are densely arranged near the ends of branches, lance-shaped to egg-shaped, 8–20 millimetres (0.3–0.8 in) long and 2–6 millimetres (0.08–0.2 in) wide. The young leaves and branches are grey-coloured.

The flowers are lilac-coloured to purple and occur singly in the leaf axils on flower stalks 3–9 millimetres (0.1–0.4 in) long. There are 5 sepals which are linear to lance-shaped, 9–17 millimetres (0.4–0.7 in) long and 1–3 millimetres (0.04–0.1 in) wide. The 5 petals form a tube 17–29 millimetres (0.7–1 in) which is glabrous on the outer surface. Flowering usually occurs in September and is followed by fruit which are oval to cone-shaped and 5–9 millimetres (0.2–0.4 in) long.

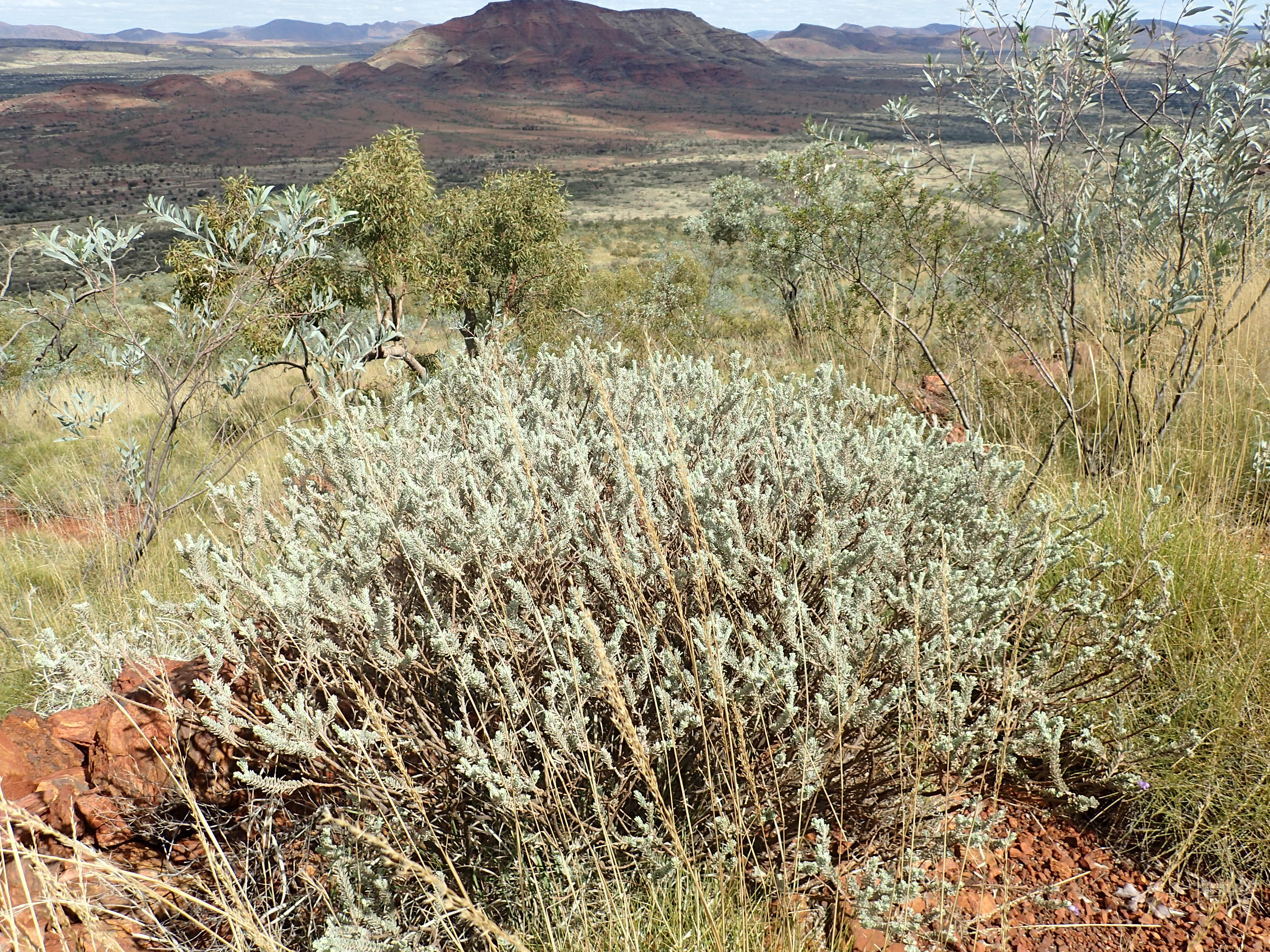
On Mount Robinson north-west of Newman

== Taxonomy and naming ==
Eremophila jucunda subsp. pulcherrima was first described by Robert Chinnock in 2007. The epithet pulcherrima is a Latin word meaning "prettiest".

== Distribution and habitat ==
This eremophila grows on rocky hils or on clay flats between Paraburdoo and Newman.

== Conservation ==
Eremophila jucunda subspecies pulcherrima is classified as "not threatened" by the Western Australian Government Department of Parks and Wildlife.
