= Youanmi Gold Mine =

Gold mine in Western Australia

Youanmi
- Location in Western Australia
- Interactive map of Youanmi
- Location: Youanmi, Western Australia, Australia; 28°36′40″S 118°50′25″E
- Products: Gold
- Production: 3.5 million tonnes for 607,200 ounces recovered
- Financial year: lifetime
- Type: open-pit, underground
- Opened: 1910
- Active: 1910–1925; 1936–1942; 1986–1992; 1995–1997
- Closed: 1997
- Company: Rox Resources (70%) Venus Metals Corporation (30%)
- Website: www.roxresources.com.au www.venusmetals.com.au
- Acquired: 2019

The Youanmi Gold Mine is a gold mine 82 km south-southwest of the town of Sandstone. It is near the abandoned town of Youanmi, in the Murchison Region of Western Australia.

Youanmi mining operations were suspended in 1997 and the mine was placed into care and maintenance. Since 2019, it is jointly owned by Rox Resources and Venus Metals Corporation, with the former managing the site.

In 1994, Youanmi became the first mine to commercially use the BACOX process (previously owned by BacTech Mining Corp, which is now REBgold Corp). This patented process, which is a proprietary of REBgold and BacTech Environmental, is a process of bacterial oxidation and bioleaching technologies that liberate precious metals from difficult-to-treat sulphide ores and concentrates, using naturally occurring bacteria. The Wiluna mine uses a similar process, the BIOX process.

The name Youanmi derives from a spring in the area and was first recorded in 1887. It was given to a surveyor by an old Aboriginal accompanying him, but its meaning is unclear.

== History ==
Gold mines in the Mid West region

After the first gold discovery at Youanami in 1894 or 1895 by prospector Tom Payne, gold mining at Youanmi was carried out intermittently from around 1908 until 1942, when the Youanmi Gold Mine was shut for the second time. The town of Youanmi rose and fell with the mine, finding itself deserted after the closure of the mine. The mine was, in those days, owned by London-based company Bewick Moreing.

The current mine has its origins in the 1980s, when an open pit operation commenced. In 1995, the mine moved to underground mining, where between 50,000 and 60,000 ounces of gold were mined per year, at an average grade of 11.5 g/t. In November 1997, the mine was closed because low gold prices, below A$400 per ounce, made the Youanmi mine uneconomic. At the time of its closure, Youanmi had produced 670,000 ounces of gold throughout its lifetime.

On 27 June 2000, Aquilia Resources Limited was listed on the Australian Securities Exchange, thereby becoming the owner of the mine, taking over from their parent companies, Quartz Mountain Mining Pty Ltd and Australian Mineral Investors Pty Ltd .

In October 2003, Aquilia sold the Youanmi mine, which it called its "Enterprise/Penny West Project", to Goldcrest Resources for A$2.75 million.

APEX purchased Youanmi in May 2007 from Goldcrest Resources Ltd for A$10 million, half of this in cash. It was purchased almost simultaneously with the Gidgee Gold Mine from Legend Mining for A$11 million.

APEX's initial plan was to refurbish and enlarge the Gidgee processing plant and use it as a central processing facility for ore from Youanmi and Gidgee, where it would mine the Wilson deposit. Production was to commence in 18 to 24 months. Parts of the Youanmi processing plant were to be relocated to Gidgee while the remainder would be used for the company's Aphrodite project. Youanmi was to initially contribute 170,000 tonnes of ore to the future gold production, sourced from the existing underground operations below 600 meters, which would have to be dewatered and refurbished first.

With the acquisition of the Wiluna Gold Mine in June 2007, Wiluna replaced Gidgee as the location of the central processing facility. Gidgee, like Youanmi, was to serve as a mining location only, with ore from Youanmi to be transported to Wiluna, over 320 km north-east of Youanmi. APEX also increased their production target from 120,000 to 200,000 ounces per annum because of the larger Wiluna plant and the lack of need to move parts of the Youanmi plant to Wiluna.

APEX announced first successful drilling results from Youanmi in December 2007 and anticipated that mining at Youanmi would commence in 2009.

In January 2008, APEX begun to dewater the open pit at Youanmi to gain access to the submerged underground portal, the pit being filled with 1.8 million cubic meters of water. It anticipated that the pit would be dewatered by the end of 2008, underground dewatering would start in early 2009, and ore production in the third quarter of 2009.

The company revised this plan, however and decided to only proceed with the development of the Wiluna mine, deferring mining at Youanmi to 2010. It halted all exploration activities at Gidgee and Younami, too. Difficulties encountered in the underground mining and plant commissioning at Wiluna forced APEX to go through a number of capital raisings, the latest in September 2009, when the company raised A$108 million. Consequently, APEX share price fell from a height of A$1.40 in early 2008 to below 4 cents by the end of 2009.

Subsequently, APEX returned to its previously abandoned strategy of sourcing ore from Gidgee as well as Wiluna for its processing facility. It now planned to commence mining at Gidgee once more in March 2010, while production from Youanmi was not planned any more at this time. In late December 2009, APEX announced a further delay with the development of the Gidgee mine because of the need of an upgrade of the Gidgee - Wiluna road. APEX anticipated that mining could be delayed another two or three months.

The company, at this point, had no immediate plans with Youanmi at the time and did not state whether it was still continuing to dewater the operation, making a reopening now unlikely. In April 2010, APEX announced that it was considering selling the mine as it did not consider it a core asset anymore.

Since the first quarter of 2013, APEX engaged the OZ Youanmi Gold Pty Ltd for the sale issue of Youanmi Project. After a lengthy negotiation between the two parties, the final sale agreement was signed in May 2013. The execution of the sale agreement between the two parties was conducted in October 2013. APEX went into receivership in July 2013 with Ferrier Hodgso appointed as the Receiver. OZ Youanmi Gold retained the mine on care and maintenance status. The company had a plan to do more drill work and seek business partners to reopen the mine.

Since 2019, the mine has been jointly owned by Rox Resources and the Venus Metals Corporation, with the former holding 70 percent and managing exploration activities, while the latter holds 30 percent. Rox Resources and Venus Metals had purchased the mine for A$4.8 million from private owners Oz Youanmi Gold.

== Ownership ==
Previous owners of the Youanmi Gold Mine:

| Company | From | To |
|---|---|---|
| Aquila Resources Ltd | June 2000 | October 2003 |
| Goldcrest Resources Ltd | October 2003 | May 2007 |
| APEX Minerals NL | May 2007 | October 2013 |
| OZ Youanmi Gold Pty Ltd | October 2013 | April 2019 |
| Rox Resources Metals Corporation | April 2019 | Present |

== See also ==
- List of active gold mines in Western Australia
