= Youanmi, Western Australia =

Abandoned town in Western Australia

Youanmi
- Town
- Interactive map of Youanmi
- Coordinates: 28°36′53″S 118°49′50″E
- Country: Australia
- State: Western Australia
- LGA: Shire of Sandstone
- Location: 570 km (350 mi) north east of Perth; 90 km (56 mi) south west of Sandstone
- Established: 1907
- Postcode: 6638

Youanmi is an abandoned town in the Murchison region of Western Australia.

The town was gazetted in 1910 but abandoned in 1942, after the local gold mine was closed.

== History ==
The first Europeans to visit the Youanmi area were the Robert Austin party in 1854, followed by the John Forrest's expedition in 1869, which passed through in search of Ludwig Leichhardt and his party.

Gold was discovered at Youanmi in 1894 or 1895 by prospector Tom Payne. The discovery site was the Golden Crown Mine, 2 kilometres (1.2 mi) southwest of the current mine mill. Activity in subsequent years was subdued until a major movement of prospectors into the area in late 1907.

By 1908 however, the Youanmi Gold Mine was set up and the local population grew to such an extent that the local Youanme Progress Committee requested the declaration of a townsite in 1910.

The town's name was originally spelt Yuani, which was thought to correctly represent the Aboriginal name, but this was soon dropped in favour of Youanmi. The name Youanmi was first recorded by a surveyor in 1887, as the name of a local spring, pointed out to him by a local Aboriginal accompanying him. Following the survey of lots, the townsite was gazetted in August 1910.

The first pastoral lease were being established at this time.

The mine was owned by London-based company Yuanmi Gold Mines, Limited.

On Christmas Eve 1929, Arthur Upfield met Snowy Rowles at Youanmi, after the latter had just murdered James Ryan and George Lloyd, in a case known as the Murchison Murders.

With the closure of the gold mine in 1942, Youanmi was almost completely abandoned.

It is the setting of the 1957 stage musical Nex' Town.

Mining at Youanmi resumed in the 1980s, when the gold mine reopened, but because of the fly-in fly-out nature of present-day mining, the town was not reestablished. Mining continued until 1997, when the mine was closed once more. At the time of its second closure, Youanmi had produced 670,000 ounces of gold throughout its lifetime.

== See also ==
- Youanmi Downs
