= Sandstone Gold Mine =

Gold mine in Western Australia

Sandstone
- Location in Western Australia
- Interactive map of Sandstone
- Location: Sandstone, Western Australia, Australia; 28°05′45″S 119°14′56″E
- Products: Gold
- Production: 0
- Financial year: 2020–21
- Opened: 1990
- Closed: 2010
- Company: Aurumin Limited
- Website: aurumin.com.au
- Acquired: 2022

The Sandstone Gold Mine is a gold mine located 6 km south east of Sandstone, Western Australia.

The mine is currently owned by Aurumin Limited, who purchased it from Middle Island Resources in 2022, but has been in care and maintenance since September 2010.

== History ==
Gold mines in the Mid West region

Gold mining at the Sandstone area stretches back over 100 years. In 1894 a prospector discovered gold about 20 km south of present-day Sandstone and, in 1903, gold was found within a few hundred meters of the town. From 1903 to 1916, 930,000 ounces of gold were mined in town. With the outbreak of the First World War, the fortunes of the mine, and the town, declined and the population in Sandstone fell from a high of 8,000 in 1906 to approximately 200 in 1919.

The current incarnation of the mine however dates back to 1990, when Herald Resources Limited begun milling operations. In 1999, Troy took ownership of the operations.

Troy commenced production at the Bulchina mine at Sandstone in 2002, which lasted until early 2005 and produced 223,000 ounces of gold. The company discovered two more gold deposits in the Sandstone region in 2004, the Lord Henry and the Lord Nelson deposits, located approximately 30 kilometres south east of Bulchina.

Mining commenced at the Lord Nelson deposit in early 2005 and at the Lord Henry deposit a year later. The Company upgraded the Sandstone milling facilities in early 2005 to be able to process 600,000 tonnes per annum.

In January 2009 it was announced that the Sandstone operation, which was to close in February that year, would remain active because of higher gold prices, which made processing low grade ore from Lord Nelson more profitable, with the mine scheduled to close in September 2010. While not a particularly large mine, Sandstone has been very profitable for Troy in the past, having been the lowest-cost gold producing mine in Australia in the early 2000s.

The Sandstone Gold Mine closed in September 2010 and was placed into care and maintenance, having produced 508,000 ounces of gold at a grade of 3.6 grams per tonne under Troy's ownership.

Ownership of the mine remained with Troy until December 2012, when it was purchased by Southern Cross Gold Limited. The primary objective of Southern Cross Gold was to relocate the processing plant to its Marda Project, located 100km to the south. Southern Cross Gold merged with Poly Metals to form Black Oak Minerals Limited, but the company was placed into administration in September 2015 and subsequently liquidated in February 2016. Middle Island Resources purchased the mine from the receivers in 2016 and focused on exploration, until selling the mine on to Aurumin Limited in late 2021, with the deal finalised in March 2022.

While Middle Island Resources and, subsequently, Aurumin Limited, own the mine's process plant and nearby tenements, the majority of the former mining area of the mine is owned by Alto Metals Limited since 2016.

== Production ==
Annual production of the mine:

Year	Production	Grade	Cost per ounce
1998	34,330 ounces	2.39 g/t	A$277
1999	9,952 ounces	1.41 g/t	A$365
1999–2000	47,803 ounces	5.48 g/t	A$157
2000–01	58,299 ounces	4.46 g/t	A$145
2001–02	46,835 ounces	3.41 g/t	A$219
2002–03	42,895 ounces	3,29 g/t	A$255
2003–04	34,123 ounces	2.66 g/t	A$415
2004–05	19,148 ounces	1.26 g/t	A$437
2005–06	67,934 ounces	4.52 g/t	A$241
2006–07	90,456 ounces	5.62 g/t	A$322
2007–08	33,846 ounces	2.65 g/t	A$706
2008–09	32,930 ounces	2.1 g/t	A$602
2009–10	29,885 ounces	2.1 g/t	A$1,000
2010–present	In care and maintenance		
