= Shire of Sandstone =

Coordinates: 27°59′17″S 119°17′46″E

Shire of Sandstone Western Australia
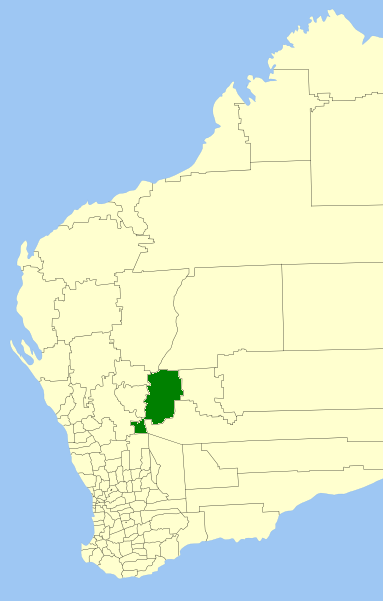
- Location in Western Australia
- Population: 109 (LGA 2021)
- Area: 32,882.2 km^{2} (12,695.9 sq mi)
- President: Bethel Walton
- Council seat: Sandstone
- Region: Mid West
- State electorate(s): Mid-West
- Federal division(s): Durack
- Website: Shire of Sandstone
LGAs around Shire of Sandstone:
Cue	Meekatharra	Wiluna
Mount Magnet	Shire of Sandstone	Leonora
Yalgoo	Mount Marshall	Menzies

The Shire of Sandstone is a local government area in the eastern Mid West region of Western Australia, about 740 kilometres (460 mi) northeast of the state capital, Perth. The Shire covers an area of 32,882 square kilometres (12,696 sq mi), and its seat of government is the town of Sandstone.

== History ==
Gold was found in the surrounding area in the late 1800s with the population of the district growing to 6,000 - 8,000 people during this time.

The Black Range Road District was gazetted on 28 March 1897, receiving some land from North Coolgardie in 1908, and Leonora-Mount Malcolm in 1930. On 1 July 1961, it was renamed Sandstone and became a Shire Council following changes to the Local Government Act which reformed all remaining road districts into shires.

== Wards ==
The shire is no longer divided into wards and the six councillors sit at large. According to the Western Australian Electoral Commission, only 65 people were registered to vote as of September 2006 within the shire's area.

== Towns and localities ==
The shire has just one locality, Sandstone.

The town of Youanmi, located in the shire, has been abandoned since 1942.

== Heritage-listed places ==
As of 2023, 53 places are heritage-listed in the Shire of Sandstone, of which three are on the State Register of Heritage Places.
