= Sandstone, Western Australia =

Sandstone
- Town
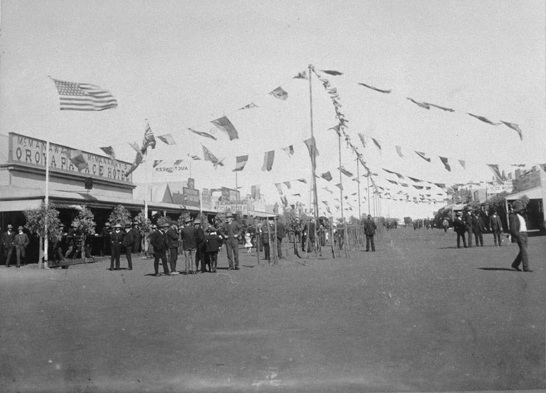
- Empire Day celebrations in Hack Street, 1909

- Interactive map of Sandstone
- Coordinates: 27°59′17″S 119°17′46″E
- Country: Australia
- State: Western Australia
- LGA: Shire of Sandstone
- Location: 661 km (411 mi) N of Perth; 157 km (98 mi) E of Mount Magnet; 196 km (122 mi) W of Leinster
- Established: 1906

Government
  - State electorate: North West Central
  - Federal division: Durack

Area
  - Total: 32,606.5 km^{2} (12,589.4 sq mi)
- Elevation: 533 m (1,749 ft)

Population
  - Total: 109 (SAL 2021)
- Postcode: 6639
- Mean max temp: 27.3 °C (81.1 °F)
- Mean min temp: 13.2 °C (55.8 °F)
- Annual rainfall: 248.3 mm (9.78 in)

Sandstone is a small town in the Goldfields region of Western Australia 100 kilometres (62 mi) west of Leinster and 661 kilometres (411 mi) north of the state capital, Perth. At the 2016 census, Sandstone and the surrounding Shire of Sandstone had a population of 89 people, including 19 families. Sandstone is the administrative centre and only town in the Shire of Sandstone local government area.

== Overview ==
The town was formed as a result of the gold strike at The Adelaide mine, owned by George Dent and the Hack brothers, Wilton and Theodore. All three of them were from South Australia and had spent eight years in the area digging for gold. They struck a reef on New Year's Day in 1903 and news quickly spread. Within a month, 60 acres of land around their lease had been pegged, from word of mouth. A town began to form, and as the population moved from nearby Nungurra to this site, many buildings were relocated. Dent and the Hack brothers sold the mine to Hans Irvine in November 1903 when they had dug as far by hand as they could. All three walked away very rich men. The mine became part of the Black Range Mining Company. 700 tonnes of ore were extracted from the mine between 1903 and 1916, and 930,000 ounces of gold were produced in those years. By 1907 Nungurra was a ghost town, as everyone had moved to Sandstone. The townsite was gazetted as Sandstone in 1906. The original "Adelaide" mine is a few hundred metres from the town centre. The mine has been known by many names - "The Adelaide", "Hack & Dents Mine", "Hacks Mine", and "Hans Irvines Find". The Hack brothers were memorialised by the naming of Sandstone's main street after them, and also by the name given to a miner's cough - "Hack's Cough". George Dent was overlooked (probably due to the fact that the mine became known as Hacks Mine because it was easier to say) and the Dent family has been endeavouring to rectify that for years with the Sandstone council.

By 1907 the population of the town had swelled to 6,000–8,000 and it had four hotels, four butchers, two banks, a staffed police station and many other stores. A brewery was also constructed in 1907 by an Irishman, I.V. Kearney, to satisfy the local demand. He built the brewery on a breakaway on top of a cliff about 35 feet high. Water was pumped to the top level for brewing and the beer was stored in the cellars below to keep it cool even in the hotter weather.

In 1910 the Sandstone branch railway was completed between Mount Magnet and Sandstone. The Jundoo Dam was completed in 1910 to provide water for the steam trains; the dam could hold 16 megalitres (3.5 million imperial gallons) of water and cost £5,000 to build. Most of the original dam works still exist today. The population of the town was approximately 2,000 adults at this time, and it had two schools.

By 1912 Sandstone had a population of 8,000 and nearby Youanmi had a population of 300. The first pastoral leases including Youanmi Downs, Yuinmery and Lake Barlee Stations were being established in the Youanmi district at this time.

A state-run battery operated from 1904 to 1982, initially 6 kilometres (3.7 mi) south of the town on the Menzies road, then from 1925 at a site 900 metres (3,000 ft) metres to the east. The battery treated a total of 135,809 tons of ore, producing 115,787 ounces of gold.

Locally London Bridge, 3 kilometres (1.9 mi) south of Sandstone, is a natural bridge, part of the Sandstone Heritage Trail. Sandstone was the inspiration for the mining town in Randolph Stow's 1963 novel Tourmaline. The smallest of the hotels built in town, the National, constructed in 1909 from locally made bricks, is the only one remaining.

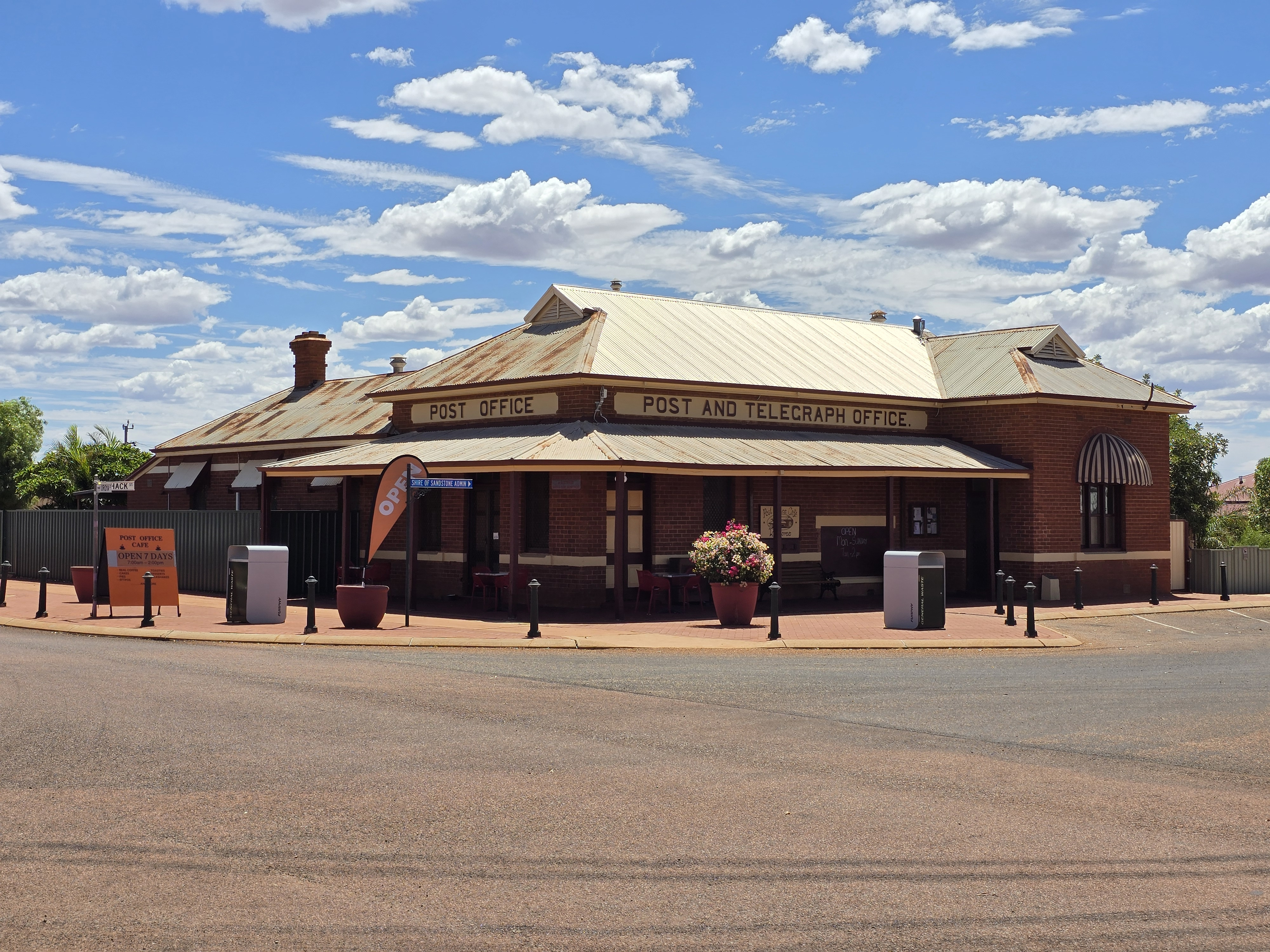
Sandstone Post Office and Telegraph Building

== See also ==
- Sandstone Gold Mine
