= List of State Register of Heritage Places in the City of Armadale =

List of heritage places in City of Armadale in Western Australia

The State Register of Heritage Places is maintained by the Heritage Council of Western Australia. As of 2026, 163 places are heritage-listed in the City of Armadale, of which 13 are on the State Register of Heritage Places.

== List ==
The Western Australian State Register of Heritage Places, as of 2026, lists the following 13 state registered places within the City of Armadale:

Place name	Place #	Location	Suburb or town	Co-ordinates	Built	State registered	Notes	Photo
Armadale Brickworks Quarry (former)	15743	Bedford Hill Road	Armadale	32°09′28″S 116°01′12″E	1901	1 June 2007	The quarry provided shale for the first brickworks in Western Australia	
St Matthew's Anglican Church Group	8774	108 Jull Street	Armadale	32°09′03″S 116°01′04″E	1904	22 May 2007	Also referred to as the Old Rectory and New Rectory and Saint Matthews Anglican Church; Consists of a church built in the Federation Gothic and late twentieth century Ecclesiastical style, the Old Rectory a residence in Federation Queen Anne style, and the New Rectory, a modern building	
Jarrah Tree, Armadale	9009	206 Jull Street	Armadale	32°09′15″S 116°00′58″E	Dated to 1500	9 September 2003	An exceptionally large Jarrah Tree (Eucalyptus marginata)	
Armadale District Hall	4669	90 Jull Street	Armadale	32°09′03″S 116°01′07″E	1936	26 August 2003	Built in the Inter-War Art Deco style	
Armadale State Brickworks Dust Room & Machinery Shed (former)	15829	Lot 12 South Western Highway	Armadale	32°10′00″S 116°00′44″E	1949	20 April 2007	Also referred to as Armadale State Brickworks (former); The brickmaking and pressing machines, dating back to the 1920s, are rare on a Western Australian and Australian level	
Ye Olde Narrogin Inne	92	2 South Western Highway	Armadale	32°09′00″S 116°01′20″E	1856	20 February 2004	Also referred to as Narrogin Hotel and Narrogin Inne; Constructed in the Inter-War Old English style at a site continuously used as a hotel since 1856	
Cole's Shaft (former)	15263	Summit View	Armadale	32°09′48″S 116°01′24″E	1846	9 September 2003	Also referred to as Forbes' Shaft, Kelmscott Mine and Neerigen Brook Mine; The first mining shaft sunk in Western Australia	
Canning Contour Channel (former)	3709	Lot 50 Canning Mills Road	Kelmscott	32°07′23″S 116°04′57″E	1935	3 June 2005	Also referred to as Contour Channel/Fireplaces and Two Stone Chimneys; A series of concrete channels 16km long; The only channel in Western Australia designed to transport large amounts of potable water by gravity whilst open to the elements; Also listed under the City of Gosnells	
Wirra Willa Gardens	4686	12 Wangoola Terrace	Mount Nasura	32°08′56″S 116°01′21″E	1935	25 March 2009	Also referred to as the Katta Mia and Catamara; A Paradise style garden laid out on a steeply sloping site	
Young Australia League Grove of the Unforgotten	15623	Araluen Botanic Park	Roleystone	32°07′24″S 116°06′07″E	1933		Also referred to as the 89 Pencil pine trees; Part of Araluen Botanic Park Precinct (3277)	
William Buckingham's Homestead	3563	Bristol Road	Roleystone	32°07′54″S 116°05′53″E	1880	20 February 2004	Also referred to as Coolgiebrie and Buckingham's Cottage; A mud brick homestead and an example of Western Australian vernacular architecture of the 1880	
Darjeeling	3562	538 Brookton Highway	Roleystone	32°07′33″S 116°03′54″E	1925	17 July 2015	A rare as an example of a residence in the Interwar Old English style	
Araluen Botanic Park	3277	Lot 523 Croyden Road	Roleystone	32°07′00″S 116°06′00″E	1931	12 December 1997	Also referred to as Araluen Park; Built by members of the Young Australia League	
