= Brookton Highway =

Highway in Western Australia

Brookton Highway Western Australia

General information
- Type: Highway
- Length: 112 km (70 mi)
- Route number(s): State Route 40

Major junctions
- West end: Albany Highway (State Route 30), Kelmscott, Perth
- Canning Road (State Route 41); Westdale Road
- East end: Great Southern Highway (State Route 120), Brookton

Location(s)
- Major settlements: Roleystone, Karragullen, Westdale, Brookton

Highway system
- Highways in Australia; National Highway • Freeways in Australia; Highways in Western Australia

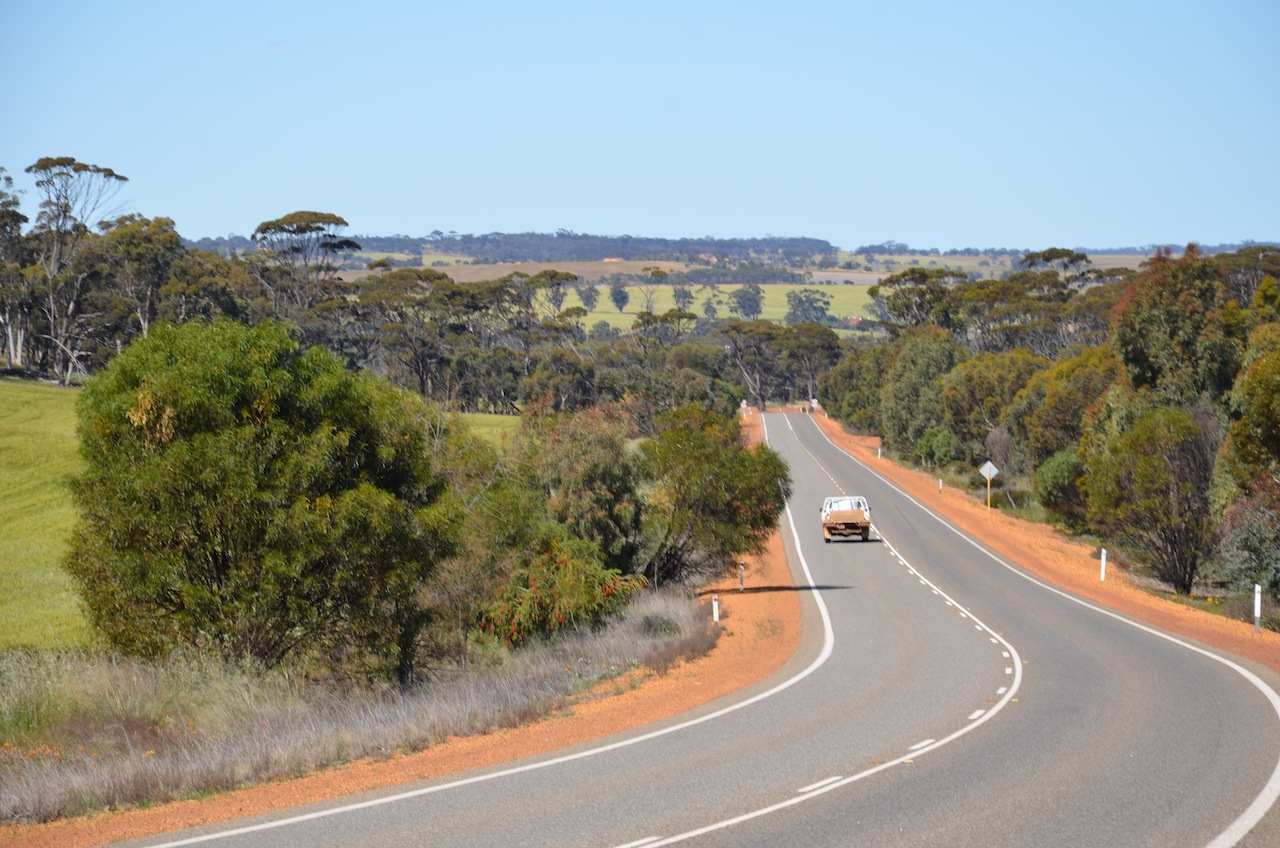
Brookton Highway near Brookton in 2013

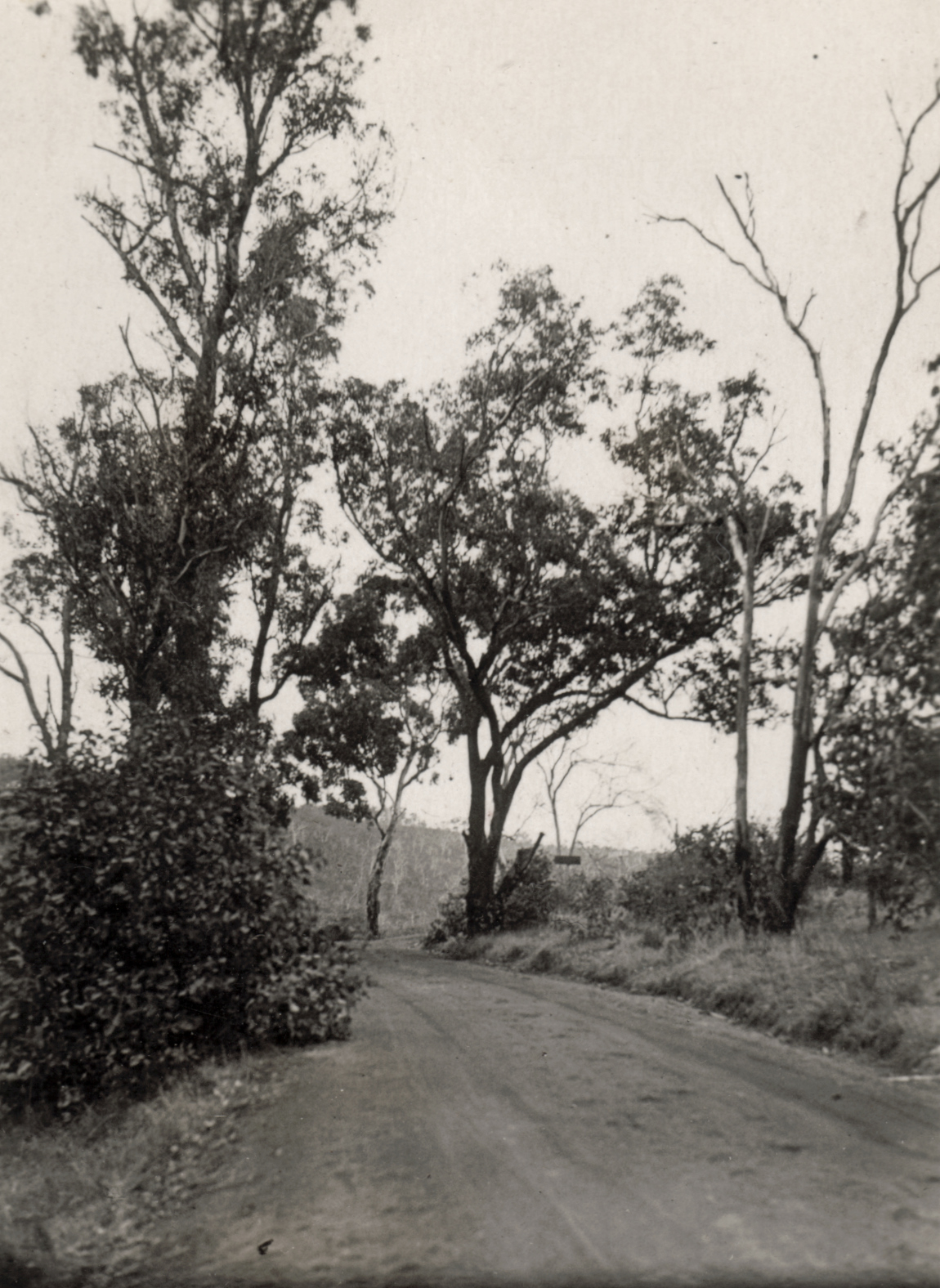
Brookton Highway, Roleystone Valley, 1927

Brookton Highway is a 112-kilometre (70 mi) long undivided single carriageway highway in Western Australia, running from the southern Perth suburb of Kelmscott, through Westdale, to the southern Wheatbelt town of Brookton. It is signposted as State Route 40; however, the route and highway continue on far past Brookton, passing through Corrigin, Kondinin, Hyden, Lake King, and finishing at South Coast Highway, just west of Ravensthorpe.

== Route description ==
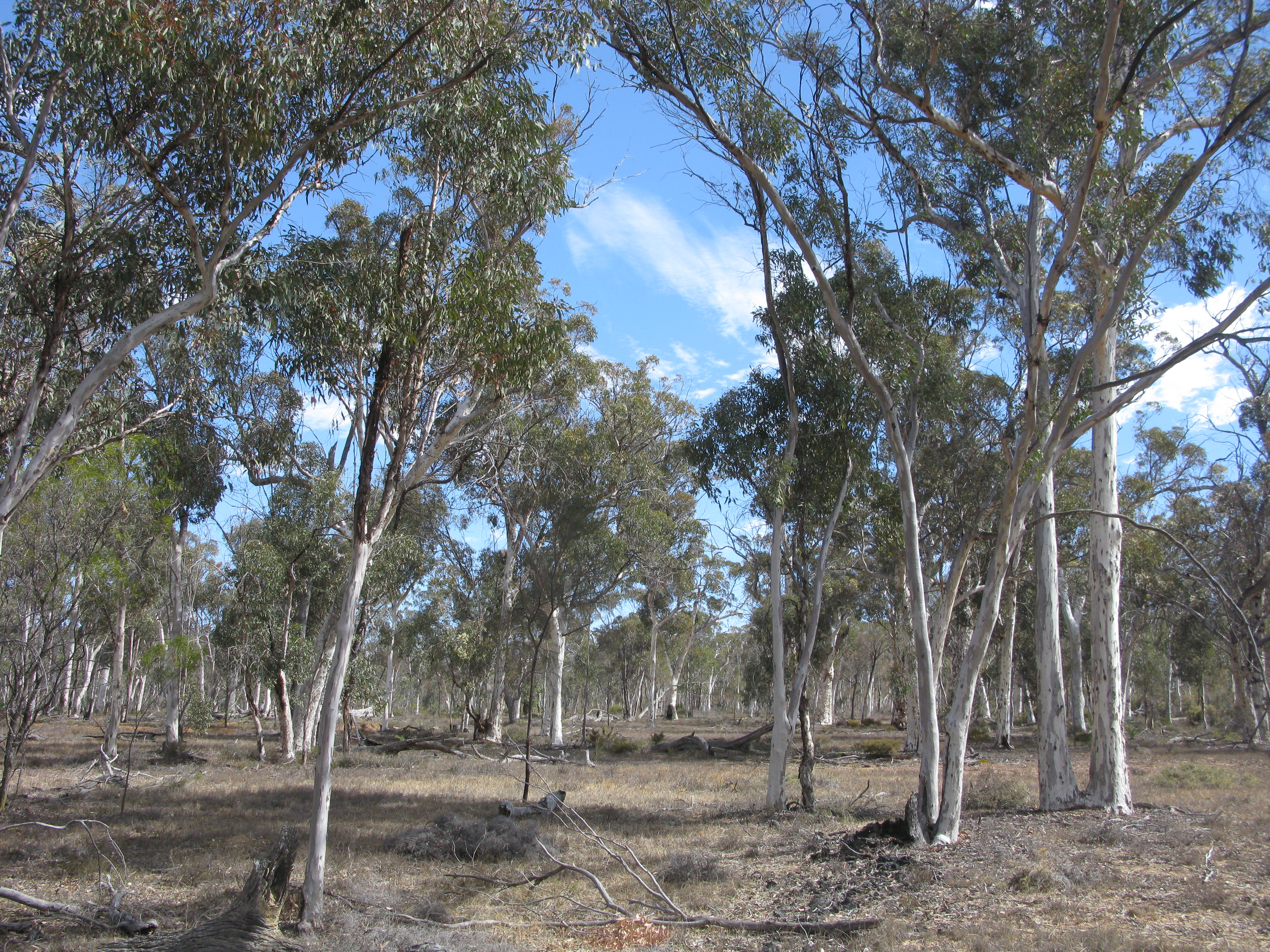
Wandoo (Eucalyptus wandoo) woodlands along the highway at Brookton Highway Nature Reserve, December 2010.

Near its western terminus, the road passes through thick jarrah forest in the Darling Scarp; however further east, the landscape soon becomes flat, passing through wheat farming regions and wandoo woodlands until reaching Brookton.

The highway is a part of the route linking Perth to Esperance and is identified as a strategic freight and tourist route. For most of the road it is able to cater for heavy vehicle combinations up to 36.5 m (120 ft) in length which generally carry grain and livestock. Tourism traffic, particularly to Wave Rock, is also prevalent along the western stretch of the road.

== History ==
The bushfire in Kelmscott and Roleystone on 6 February 2011 destroyed the Buckingham Bridge. The bridge had originally been built from timber in 1935. A temporary bridge over the Canning River was opened on 4 March 2011 and was constructed using 400 tonnes (880,000 lb) of rock, 250 tonnes (550,000 lb) of crushed limestone and 4,500 tonnes (9,900,000 lb) of fill material. Heavy vehicles were unable to use the structure and had to detour at Welshpool Road. This part of the highway is used by up to 4,000 vehicles per day.

The Buckingham Bridge was replaced with a permanent concrete and steel bridge, constructed to the south of the temporary crossing so that traffic was not disturbed. The new Buckingham Bridge was opened to traffic on 25 July 2013.

== Major intersections ==
LGA	Location	km	mi	Destinations	Notes
Armadale	Kelmscott–Mt Nasura boundary	0	0.0	Albany Highway (State Route 30) – Perth, Gosnells, Armadale, Albany	Traffic light intersection, western terminus
Armadale	Roleystone	5.0	3.1	Peet Road north/ Soldiers Road (Tourist Drive 205) south – Bedfordale	Tourist Drive 205 western concurrency terminus, staggered T-intersections
Armadale	Roleystone	5.9	3.7	Croyden Road (Tourist Drive 205) – Ashendon, Araluen Botanic Park	Tourist Drive 205 eastern concurrency terminus
Armadale	Karragullen	12.2	7.6	Canning Road (State Route 41) – Canning Mills, Kalamunda, Lesmurdie	
Beverley	West Dale	65.8	40.9	Westdale Road – Dale, Beverley	
Brookton	Jelcobine	91.8– 92.2	57.0– 57.3	York Williams Road – York, Pingelly, Williams	Staggered T-intersections
Brookton	Brookton	110.0	68.4	Brookton Corrigin Road (State Route 40/State Route 120) east/ Williams Street (State Route 120) south – Beverley, Corrigin, Pingelly, Narrogin	Both roads connects to Great Southern Highway. Brookton Highway eastern terminus. T-intersection favouring Brookton Highway which continues as Brookton Corrigin Road to the east
Concurrency terminus; Route transition

== See also ==
- Highways in Australia
- List of highways in Western Australia
