= Camillo, Western Australia =

Camillo
- Suburb
- Interactive map of Camillo
- Coordinates: 32.115°S 116.002°E
- Country: Australia
- State: Western Australia
- City: Perth
- LGA: City of Armadale
- Location: 25 km (16 mi) SSE of Perth; 5 km (3.1 mi) NW of Armadale

Government
  - State electorate: Armadale
  - Federal division: Burt

Area
  - Total: 2.6 km^{2} (1.0 sq mi)

Population
  - Total: 4,442 (SAL 2021)
- Postcode: 6111
Suburbs around Camillo
Champion Lakes	Champion Lakes	Martin
Champion Lakes	Camillo	Kelmscott
Seville Grove	Kelmscott	Kelmscott

Camillo is a southeastern suburb of Perth, Western Australia. Its local government area is the City of Armadale and it was part of Kelmscott until 1978. It was named after Camillo Cyrus, the child of Gertrude Seeligson, a local property owner in the area in 1901. Champion Lakes, formerly part of the area, became a separate suburb in 2002. Until mid-2008, it was named Westfield, named after a siding on the Jandakot railway line.

== Schools ==
- Westfield Park Primary School (1970)
- Grovelands Primary School (1980).
- John Wollaston Anglican Community School (1988) - K–12.

== Transport ==
=== Bus ===
- 243 Kelmscott Station to Armadale Station – serves Cammillo Road, O'Sullivan Drive, Ypres Road, Lake Road, Baxendale Way, Grovelands Drive and Westfield Road
- 245 Kelmscott Station to Armadale Station – serves Westfield Road
