= John Wollaston (priest) =

Western Australian Anglican clergyman

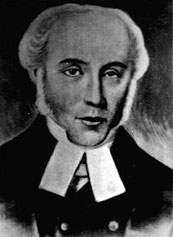
John Wollaston

John Ramsden Wollaston (28 March 1791 – 3 May 1856) was an Anglican priest who was instrumental in the establishment of the Church of England in Western Australia.

Wollaston was born in London and educated at Charterhouse School where his father, Edward Wollaston, was a master. After taking holy orders, in May 1819 he married Mary Amelia Gledstanes with whom he had five sons: John R Wollaston, William E Wollaston, Henry N Wollaston, George G Wollaston and Edward C Wollaston and five daughters: Elizabeth M Wollaston, Mary E Wollaston, Mary A Wollaston, Agnes E Wollaston and Sophia C Wollaston. In 1840 Wollaston applied for the position of Chaplain for the Western Australian Land Company, a speculative venture that was seeking emigrant settlers to go to Australind, Western Australia, near Port Leschenault. The company failed to appoint him officially but continued to promote the venture by saying Wollaston was available. In the confusion, Wollaston proceeded to the new colony believing that he had been appointed as Colonial Chaplain and that an official stipend would be forthcoming on his arrival.

By the time he arrived, the Australind settlement was on the verge of collapse, largely due to its isolation from the rest of the colony at the Swan River. Wollaston found himself nearly destitute and without a parish but with an offer from the Governor, John Hutt to pay him a stipend of 100 pounds a year once a church had been built. Together with his sons he purchased some land alongside the Preston River and a dilapidated ex-whalers cottage which he called "Charterhouse" and built a small timber chapel nearby. The church opened without consecration in September 1842 and is the second oldest still standing church in Western Australia, after All Saints Church at Henley Brook. It was later consecrated as St Mark's and is now located at the corner of Flynn and Charterhouse Close, Picton, Bunbury.

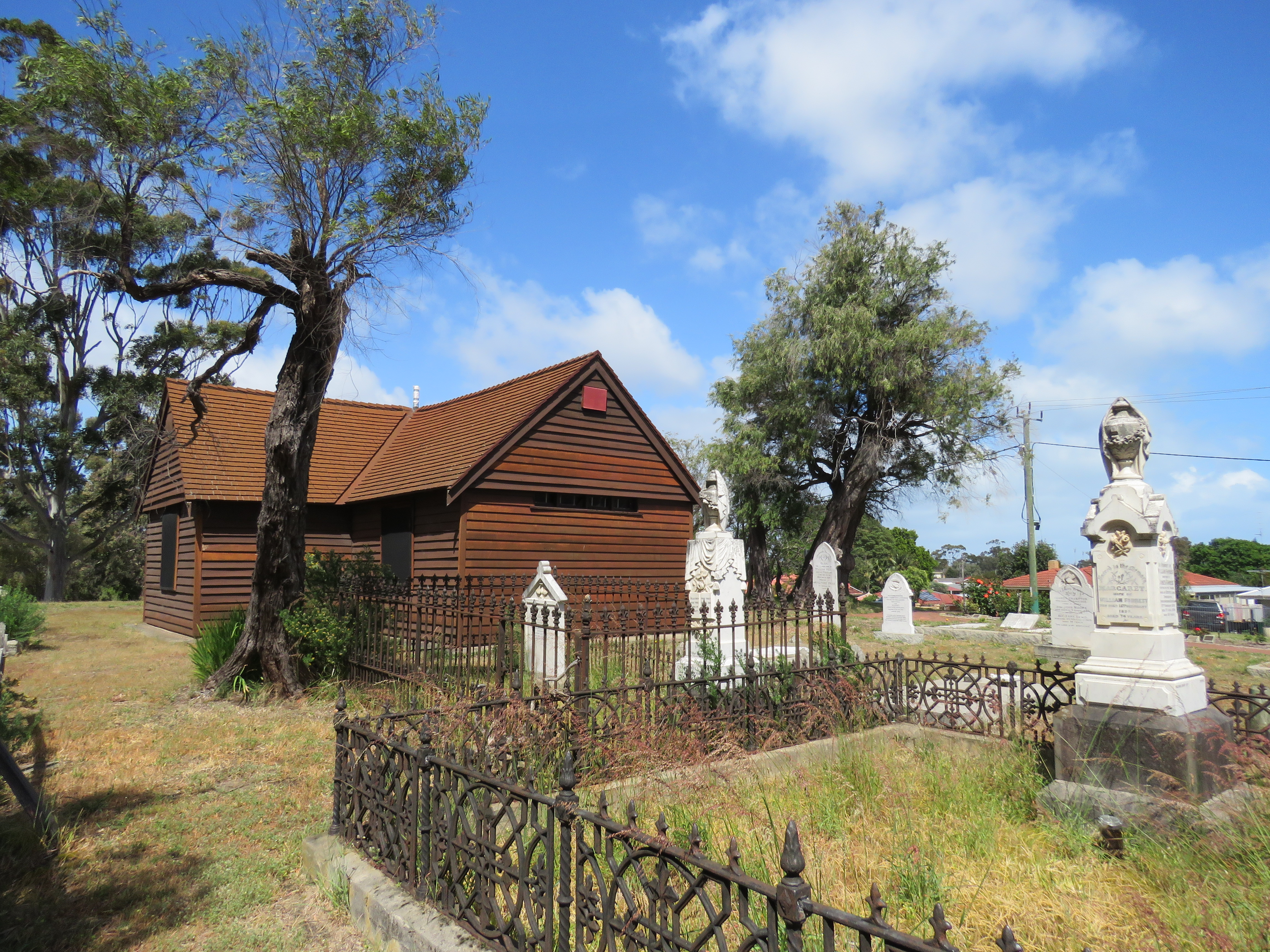
St Mark's Anglican Church, Bunbury

In February 1842 he convened a conference of the five Anglican clergy in Perth, in an attempt to revitalise falling church attendances. The conference called on Bishop William Broughton from New South Wales to visit Western Australia regularly, however the request was denied.

In 1848 the new governor, Charles Fitzgerald transferred Wollaston to Albany. In October 1848 he was visited by Bishop Short and Archdeacon Hale of the new diocese of Adelaide. Bishop Short was impressed with Wollaston and appointed him Archdeacon of Western Australia, an office he held from 1848 until his death in 1856. Although now nearly 60, he spent his remaining years travelling his diocese extensively, always on horseback. He died aged 65 of a cerebral hemorrhage due to exhaustion.

Wollaston campaigned vigorously in his latter years for the establishment of a Bishopric in Perth, and this was finally granted in 1857 with Matthew Hale appointed the first Bishop of Perth.

Wollaston College (formerly the John Wollaston Theological College) (est. 1957), the John Wollaston Anglican Community School in Kelmscott and the Bunbury suburb of Wollaston are all named after him.
