= Pterostylis ciliata =

Hairy rufous greenhood

Scientific classification
- Kingdom: Plantae
- Clade: Tracheophytes
- Clade: Angiosperms
- Clade: Monocots
- Order: Asparagales
- Family: Orchidaceae
- Subfamily: Orchidoideae
- Tribe: Cranichideae
- Genus: Pterostylis
- Species: P. ciliata

Binomial name
- Pterostylis ciliata M.A.Clem. & D.L.Jones

Synonyms
- Oligochaetochilus ciliata Szlach. orth. var.; Oligochaetochilus ciliatus (M.A.Clem. & D.L.Jones) Szlach.

Species of orchid

Pterostylis ciliata, commonly known as hairy rufous greenhood, tall rusthood or hairy rustyhood is a plant in the orchid family Orchidaceae and is endemic to the south-west of Western Australia. It has a relatively large rosette of leaves at its base and up to eight or more green and brown flowers which lean forward and have a small, fleshy, insect-like labellum covered with hairs.

== Description ==
Pterostylis ciliata, is a terrestrial, perennial, deciduous, herb with an underground tuber. It has a rosette of between four and eight leaves 20–35 mm (0.8–1 in) long and 7–12 mm (0.3–0.5 in) wide. Flowering plants have a rosette at the base of the flowering spike but the leaves are usually withered by flowering time. Between two and eight or more green, brown and white, hairy flowers with translucent panels and 15–20 mm (0.6–0.8 in) long, 8–9 mm (0.3–0.4 in) wide are borne on a flowering spike 100–220 mm (4–9 in) tall. The flowers lean forward and there are a small number of stem leaves wrapped around the flowering spike. The dorsal sepal and petals form a hood or "galea" over the column with the dorsal sepal having a narrow tip 8–10 mm (0.3–0.4 in) long. The lateral sepals turn downwards, are wider than the galea and suddenly taper to narrow tips 10–16 mm (0.4–0.6 in) long which turn forward. The labellum is fleshy, green, brown and insect-like, 4–5 mm (0.16–0.20 in) long, about 2 mm (0.08 in) wide and covered with many long and short hairs. Flowering occurs from September to November.

== Taxonomy and naming ==
Pterostylis ciliata was first formally described in 1989 by Mark Clements and David Jones from a specimen collected near the Brookton Highway and the description was published in Australian Orchid Research. The specific epithet (ciliata) is derived from the Latin word cilium meaning "eyelash" referring to the hairs on the labellum.

== Distribution and habitat ==
Hairy rufous greenhood grows in woodland and shrubland and is common in wandoo woodland. It occurs between Beverley and Esperance, sometimes as far north as Kalgoorlie, in the Avon Wheatbelt, Esperance Plains, Jarrah Forest, Mallee and Murchison biogeographic regions.

== Conservation ==
Pterostylis ciliata is classified as "not threatened" by the Western Australian Government Department of Parks and Wildlife.
