= Upper Darling Range railway line =

Former branch railway in Western Australia

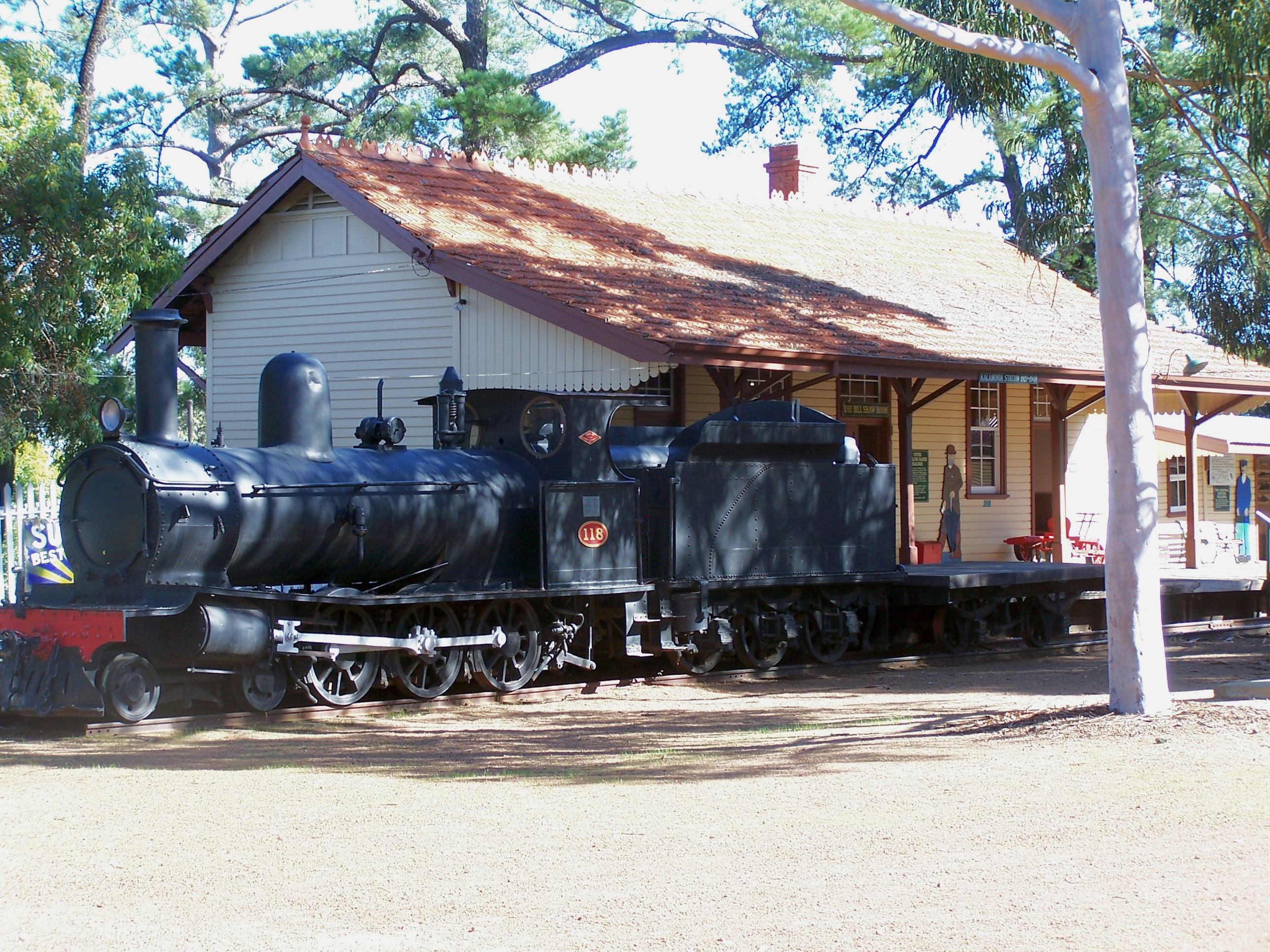
- G118 at the Kalamunda Historical Village on the site of Kalamunda station

Overview
- Status: Dismantled
- Termini: Midland Junction; Karragullen

Service
- System: Western Australian Government Railways

History
- Opened: July 1891
- Closed: 22 July 1949

Technical
- Line length: 35 kilometres
- Track gauge: 1,067 mm (3 ft 6 in)

The Upper Darling Range railway line (also known as the Upper Darling Range branch) was a branch railway from Midland Junction, Western Australia, that rose up the southern side of the Helena Valley and on to the Darling Scarp via the Kalamunda Zig Zag. At the time of construction it was the only section of railway in Western Australia to have had a zig zag formation.

== History ==
Completed in July 1891, the Upper Darling Range railway line was built by the Canning Jarrah Timber Company to supply railway sleepers to Perth's growing railway system. It ran from Midland Junction railway station through to the Darling Ranges and up into Kalamunda. It was later extended to Canning Mills and in 1912 to Karragullen. From Pickering Brook, a line branched off to Bartons Mill.

On 1 July 1903, the line was taken over by the Western Australian Government Railways and became known as the Upper Darling Range branch. The last service ran on 22 July 1949. The line was formally closed by the Railway (Upper Darling Range) Discontinuance Act 1950; it was dismantled in 1952.

== Stopping places ==
Gradient profile map

Named stopping places and locations on the line included:

Name	Previous name(s)	Distance from Perth		Height above sea level	
Midland Junction station	Helena Vale	15 km	9.3 mi	15 m	49 ft
Bushmead (now under Roe Highway)	Waterhall	17 km	11 mi	26 m	85 ft
Rifle Range		23 km	14 mi	104 m	341 ft
Poison Gully Creek (scene of 1904 crash)					
Number 1 Points Ridge Hill (lower section of Zig Zag)		27 km	17 mi		
Number 2 Points Statham's Quarry	Perth City Council siding from 1920	28 km	17 mi		
Number 3 Points					
Number 4 Points (upper section of Zig Zag)	Possibly known as The Knoll				
Gooseberry Hill		30 km	19 mi	242 m	794 ft
Kalamunda	Stirk's Landing	32 km	20 mi	242 m	794 ft
South Kalamunda	Guppy's Siding	35 km	22 mi	283 m	928 ft
Walliston	Wallis's Crossing	37 km	23 mi	311 m	1,020 ft
Bickley	(named Heidelberg between 1904 and 1915)	38 km	24 mi	318 m	1,043 ft
Carmel	Green's Landing	40 km	25 mi	286 m	938 ft
Pickering Brook	Pickering Junction	42 km	26 mi	282 m	925 ft
Canning Mills	Canning Timber Station	48 km	30 mi	254 m	833 ft
Karragullen		50 km	31 mi	300 m	980 ft
