= Roleystone Community College =

High school in Western Australia

Location
- Roleystone, Perth, Western Australia; Australia; 32°06′12″S 116°05′09″E

Information
- Former name: Roleystone District High School
- Type: Public co-educational high day school
- Established: 1983; 43 years ago
- Educational authority: WA Department of Education
- Principal: Mark Brookes
- Years: 7–10
- Enrolment: 207 (2011)
- Campus type: Suburban
- Website: roleystonecc.wa.edu.au

Roleystone Community College is an Independent Public high school, located in Roleystone, 35 kilometres (22 mi) south east of Perth, Western Australia.

Planning for the school began in 1978 when the local community commenced discussions to prepared a detailed plan for a high school to be established in the area. The Department of Education and Training attended meetings in 1980 and by 1982 a decision was reached that a high school catering for students from Years 6 to 10 would be established.

The school opened in 1983 in temporary accommodation as Roleystone District High School, and the students moved to permanent buildings in term 2. The school was built amongst jarrah woodland to an award-winning design. By 1985 the school had over 600 enrolments. Further classrooms were added in 1986. The school had a total enrolment of 283 in 2007, 225 in 2008, 224 in 2009, 239 in 2010 and 207 in 2011.

== See also ==
- List of schools in the Perth metropolitan area
