= Karragullen, Western Australia =

Karragullen
- Suburb
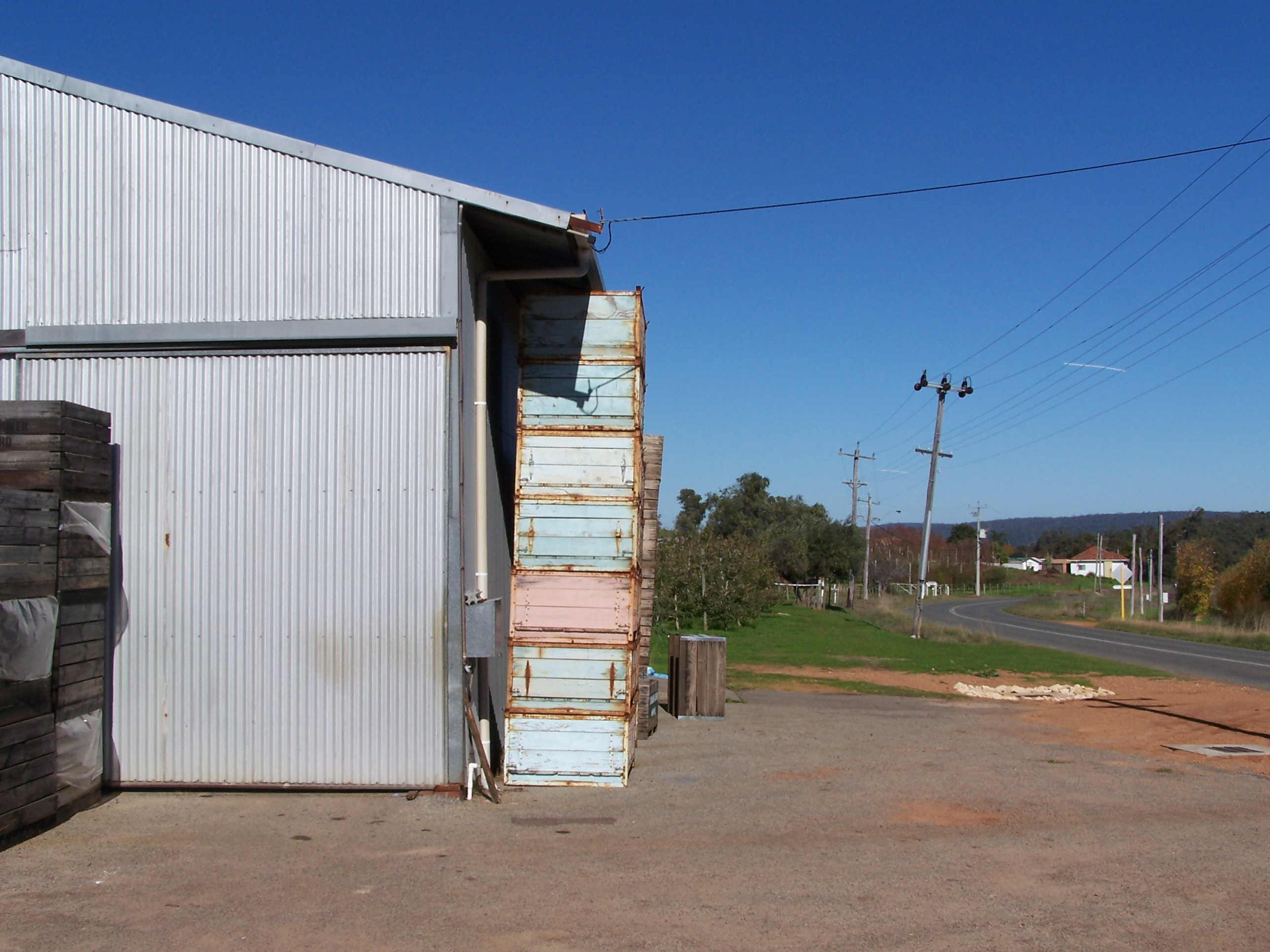
- A fruit shed and orchard in Karragullen.
- Interactive map of Karragullen
- Coordinates: 32.091°S 116.122°E
- Country: Australia
- State: Western Australia
- City: Perth
- LGA: City of Armadale
- Location: 33 km (21 mi) from Perth; 16 km (9.9 mi) from Armadale

Government
  - State electorate: Darling Range
  - Federal division: Bullwinkel

Area
  - Total: 29.9 km^{2} (11.5 sq mi)

Population
  - Total: 395 (SAL 2021)
- Postcode: 6111
Suburbs around Karragullen
Martin	Canning Mills	Pickering Brook
Roleystone	Karragullen
Ashendon	Ashendon

Karragullen is a suburb of Perth, Western Australia, located within the City of Armadale. Its postcode is 6111.

Prior to 1949, it was a stopping place on the Upper Darling Range railway.

The suburb is an agricultural area and is predominantly known as orchard country. Many of the orchards were developed by Italian migrants in the 1930s and 1940s, and these have subsequently been taken over by their 1st and 2nd generation Australian descendants.

The Karragullen area borders the Canning Dam reservoir zone and the start of bushland in the east-southeast direction from Perth. It neighbours Pickering Brook to the east and Roleystone to the west.

Once a year, Karragullen hosts a field day that showcases the local industries and their practices. The event has been running for over 20 years.

In December 2004, a fire ravage most of the bushland and some areas of orchard. Firefighters and locals rallied together to battle the blaze, that is believed to have been started by an arsonist.

== See also ==
- Darling Scarp
