= Champion Lakes, Western Australia =

Champion Lakes
- Suburb
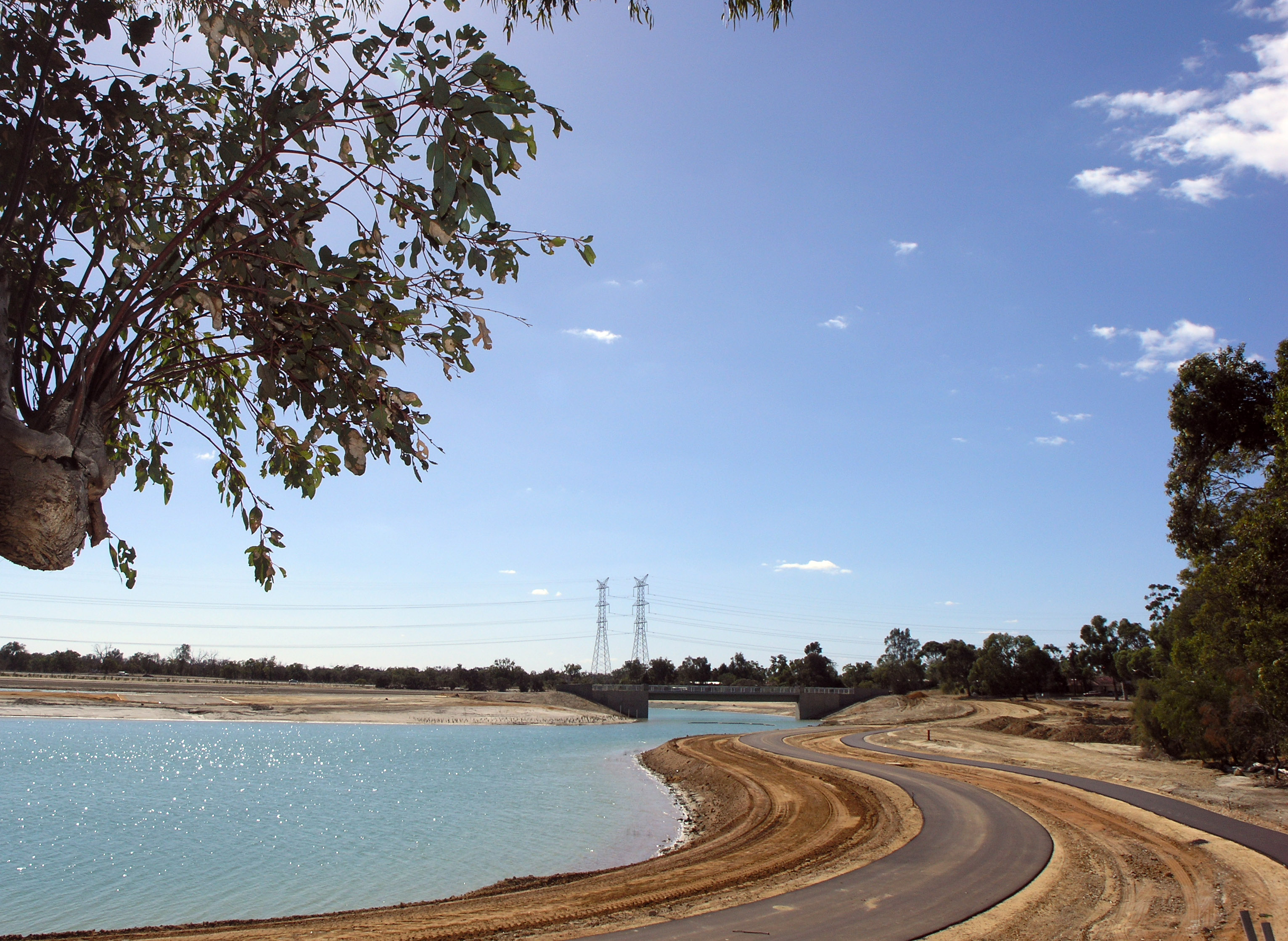
- Regatta Centre under construction
- Interactive map of Champion Lakes
- Coordinates: 32.120°S 115.984°E
- Country: Australia
- State: Western Australia
- City: Perth
- LGA: City of Armadale
- Location: 22 km (14 mi) from Perth; 7 km (4.3 mi) from Armadale
- Established: 2002

Government
  - State electorate: Armadale
  - Federal division: Burt

Area
  - Total: 5.0 km^{2} (1.9 sq mi)

Population
  - Total: 1,355 (SAL 2021)
- Postcode: 6111
Suburbs around Champion Lakes
Gosnells	Gosnells	Martin
Southern River	Champion Lakes	Camillo
Forrestdale	Seville Grove	Camillo

Champion Lakes is a suburb of Perth, Western Australia in the City of Armadale.

The suburb was originally part of Camillo, but was renamed in 2002 along with the proposal for a large water-based recreation facility that was constructed in the area, Champion Lakes Regatta Centre.

== Transport ==
=== Bus ===
- 220 Armadale Station to Perth Busport – serves Albany Highway
- 243 Armadale Station to Kelmscott Station – serves Lake Road
