= Kalamunda railway station =

Former railway station in Western Australia

Kalamunda
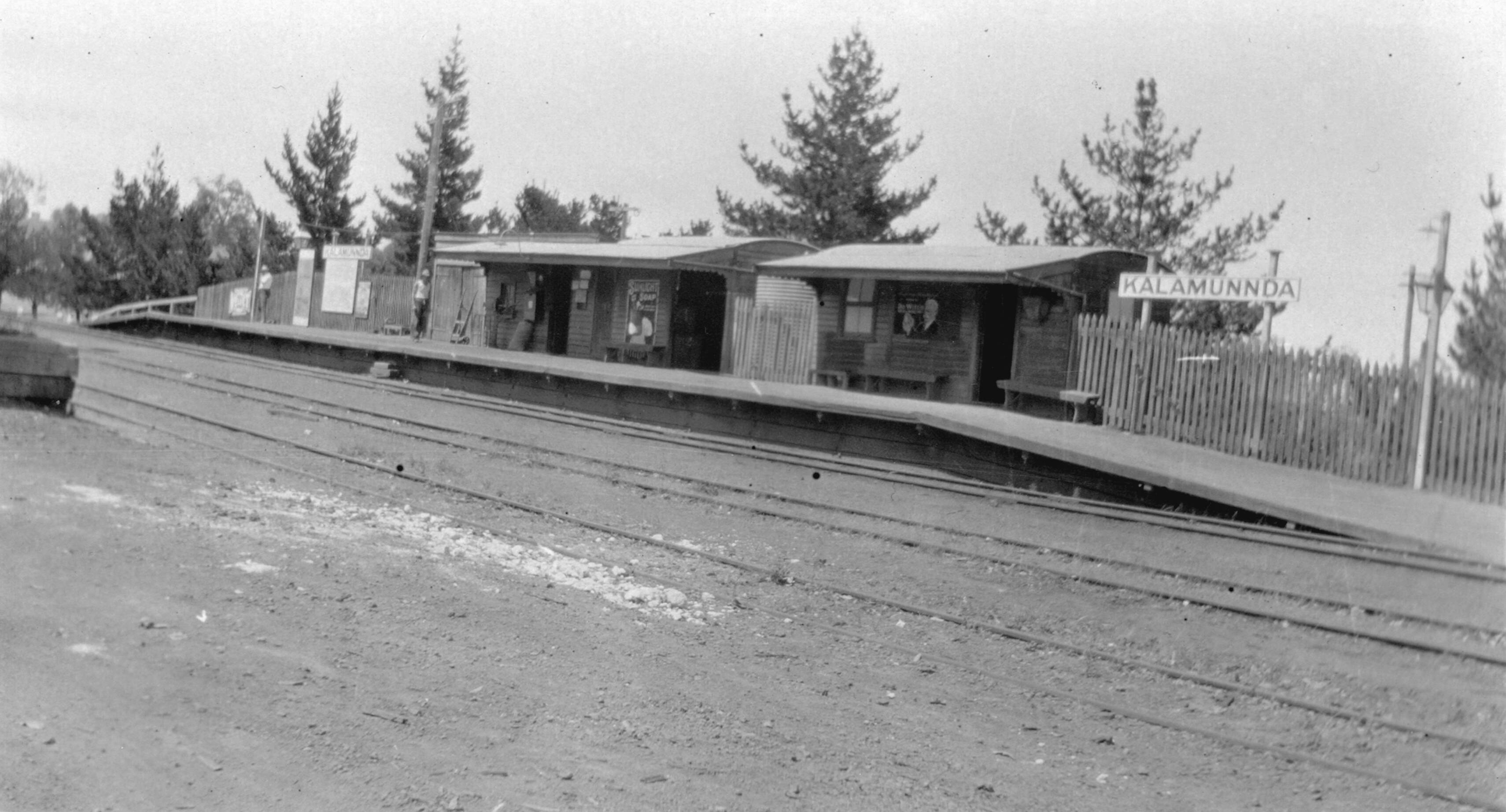
- Kalamunda railway station, 1926

General information
- Location: Railway Road, Kalamunda
- Coordinates: 31.970158°S 116.059225°E
- Owner: Western Australian Government Railways
- Operator: Western Australian Government Railways
- Line: Upper Darling Range railway
- Distance: 50 kilometres from Perth
- Platforms: 1
- Tracks: 3

Construction
- Structure type: Ground

Other information
- Status: Closed

History
- Opened: July 1891
- Closed: 22 July 1949
- Former names: Stirk’s Landing; Jeck’s Crossing; Kalamunnda
Location

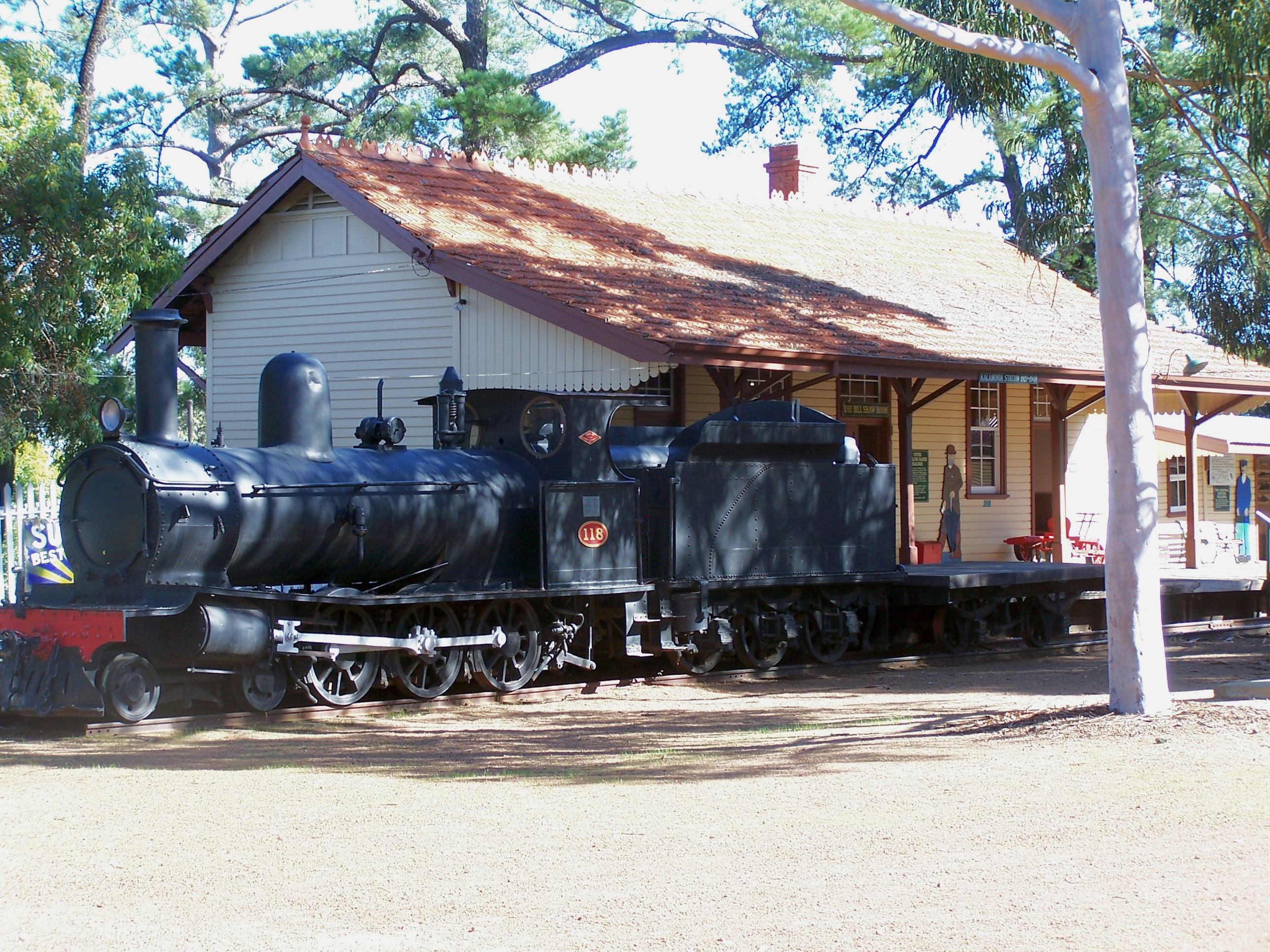
Kalamunda railway station

Kalamunda railway station (alternatively spelled Kalamunnda) was a major station on the Upper Darling Range railway in Western Australia serving the town of Kalamunda. It was known earlier as Stirk's Landing and was located at a distance 20 miles from Perth.

== History ==
When the Upper Darling Range railway opened in July 1891, Kalamunda was the only station on the line with raised platforms. It had two station buildings, a water tower and sidings for passing trains and for storing wagons. In 1926, a new station building was built.

The station closed on 22 July 1949, along with the rest of the line. The station has been redeveloped as the Kalamunda History Village.
