= Young Australia League =

Australian youth organization

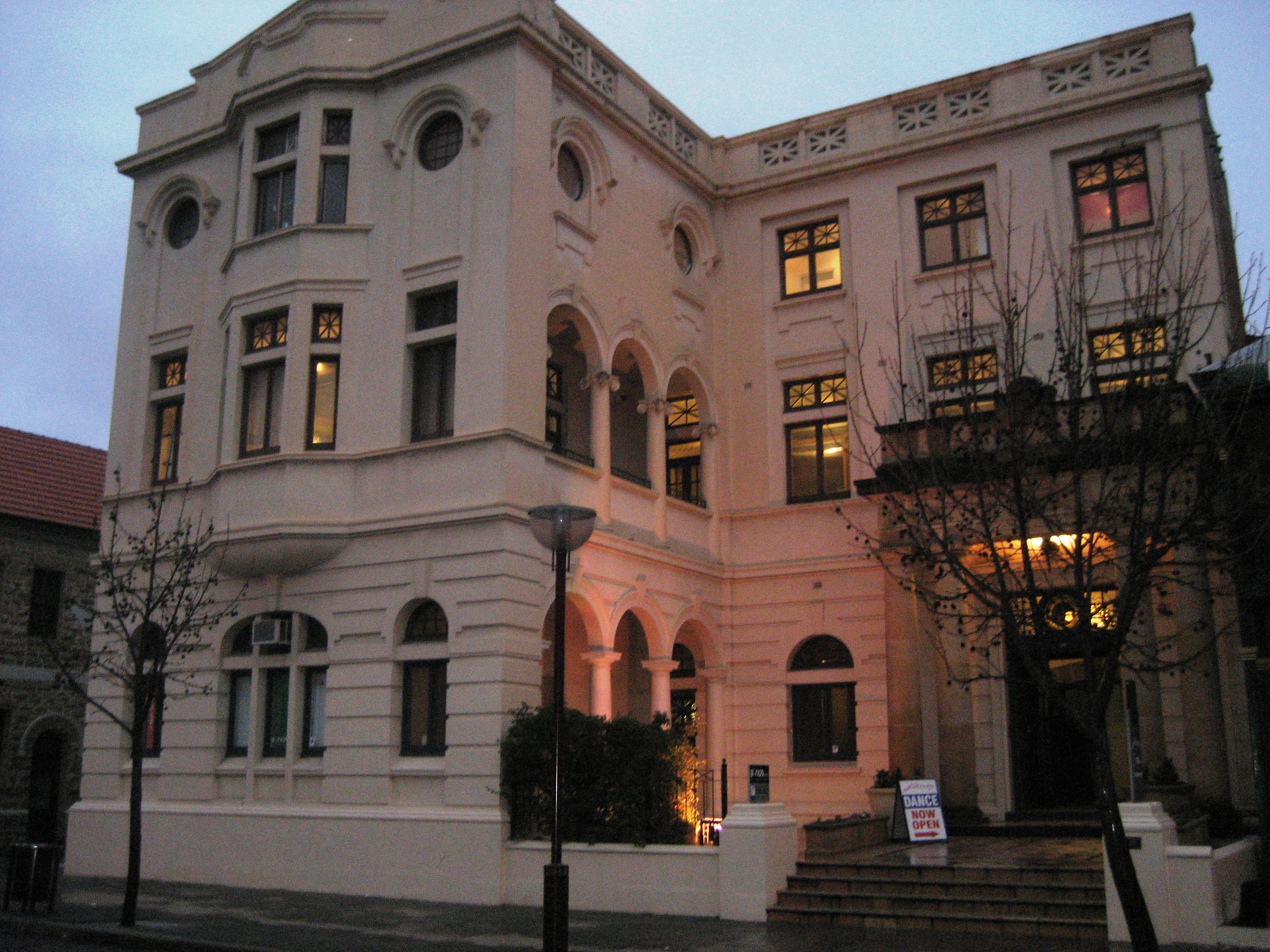
Young Australian League headquarters in Murray Street, Perth

The Young Australia League (Inc) (YAL) is an Australian youth organisation which was formed in Perth, Western Australia in 1905 by Jack Simons and Lionel Boas. Developed as a means to encourage Australian nationalism and patriotic values, the organisation organises activities and the ideals of "Education through Travel", the aims of its founders.

Prior to the formation of the organisation, Australian rules football was struggling to gain traction as an extracurricular activity outside of Victoria. The success of the league in boosting junior numbers was instrumental in the rapid growth of Australian rules football in Western Australia as well as consolidating its position in schools across the nation.

== History ==
=== Birth of the Young Australia Football League ===
Simons was secretary of the Western Australian Football League (WAFL) between 1905 and 1914, and believed that the encroachment of soccer, rugby and other "non-Australian" sports was threatening the game of Australian rules football. Along with several prominent Western Australians including Lionel Boas, the Young Australia Football League was formed in 1905 as a development organisation for football in Western Australia.

By 1905 Soccer had infiltrated most of the schools in Western Australia, and despite efforts from the WAFA, it was fighting a losing battle for access to junior players. Simons would talk of the "virilent" disdain for which the British had for colonial football games, trying to stamp them out where possible, which was much to the ire of British authorities. Rugby was also very popular in Western Australia, despite the WAFA making significant ground over it. Between the two sports, as an administrator, Simons clearly had his work cut out for him and resented that the governing bodies of the eastern states would take kudos for his efforts in growing the game while displaying an otherwise apparent disinterest. Joining the Australasian Football Council in 1906 as one of two representatives, however, Simons was instrumental in the sport being introduced into schools throughout the country.

The League organised intra- and interstate tours for young Western Australian football players to promote the Australian rules football code as part of a broader nationalist agenda. Other people involved with the establishment of the League were prominent Western Australian artists H. H. Eastcourt and Arthur Clarke, and noted Victorian artist Robert Prenzel.

Mr. E. W Quinn became president in 1908 and during his tenure, player numbers doubled to 11 teams and 300 registered players.

=== Young Australia League ===
The YAFL changed its name to 'Young Australia League', and its activities were diversified to include literature, debating, band music, sport and theatrical performances, as well as outdoor pursuits such as hiking and camping. Setting its activities mainly for boys, the League promoted a philosophy of development of Australian nationalism with the aim of becoming the 'largest boys club in the British Empire'. In 1909 the League had its first of many interstate tours, with overseas tours conducted in 1911, 1914, 1924 and 1929. These tours were instrumental in kick-starting the sport in the United States and in Canada prior to the war.

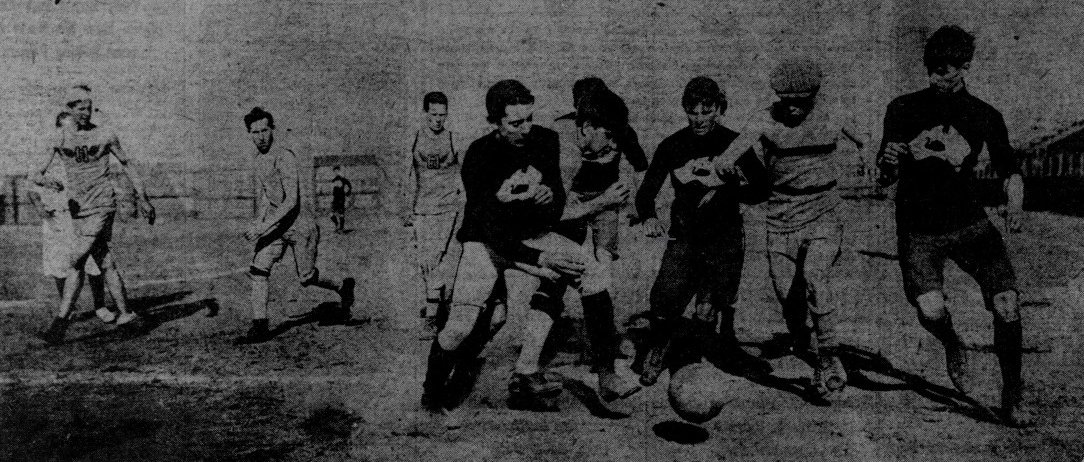
Young Australia League vs USA schoolboys. Presidio of San Francisco. 1 October 1911

After World War I, branches were established in other states along similar lines to the Perth organisation.

59 hectares (150 acres) of land was purchased in 1929 in the Darling Scarp near Roleystone and developed for the League's outdoor activities. This became Araluen Botanical Gardens, as a memorial to YAL members killed in action, and was dedicated in 1930 by the Governor, Sir William Campion.

Simons, who had extensive publishing interests, died in 1948. Four years prior, he assigned his interest in Western Press to YAL, giving the League a bequest of $50,000.

The League continued but is now only operational in Western Australia. Due to declining funds, Araluen had fallen into disrepair by 1985 and was sold to the Government of Western Australia. Since 1990 it has been run as a not-for-profit volunteer organisation, responsible for the Park's restoration, preservation and development.

In Simon's lifetime, an estimated 50,000 people participated in the well-known YAL travel tours around the world.

Boas was president of the League for forty years, until his death in 1949.

== Facilities ==
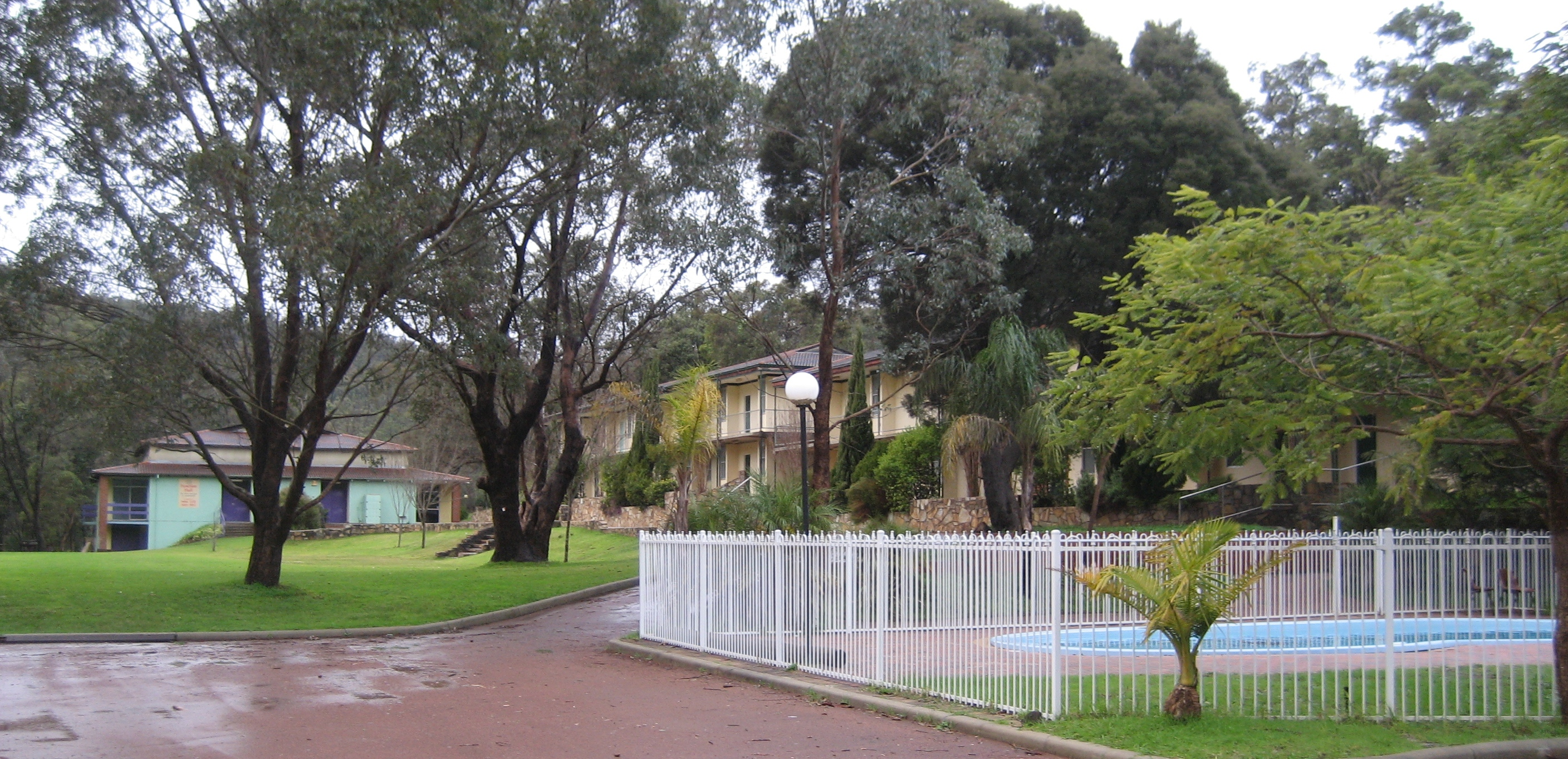
Camp Simons

The League's headquarters are at 45 Murray Street, at the corner of Irwin Street, Perth; a heritage listed building which was built in 1924 to accommodate clubrooms and administration. The foyer houses an extensive museum of memorabilia associated with the League's early years.

"Camp Simons or" was a YAL–operated youth camp set in bushland near Araluen, about 3 km from Canning Dam. It has accommodations for about 200 people.
