= Thomas Hobbes Scott =

Australian politician

The Venerable Thomas Hobbes Scott
- Archdeacon of New South Wales

Orders
- Ordination: 1822

Personal details
- Born: 17 April 1783 Kelmscott, Oxfordshire
- Died: 1 January 1860 (aged 76) Whitfield, Northumberland
- Denomination: Anglican

Thomas Hobbes Scott (17 April 1783 – 1 January 1860) was an English-born Anglican cleric active in the Colony of New South Wales.

== Early life ==
Scott was born in Kelmscott, Oxford, England, one of the youngest of eight children of James Scott, sometime vicar of Itchen Stoke, Hampshire, and chaplain ordinary to George III, and his wife Jane Elizabeth, née Harmood.

Scott went to France after his father's death and was a vice-consul at Bordeaux and later went bankrupt as a wine merchant.

== Later life and death ==
Scott then set sail for England aboard HMS Success. The ship struck a reef off Fremantle on 28 November 1829, marooning him in the new Swan River Colony, in which he was the first ordained minister. He ministered alone to the colony for two months, building a temporary church and officiating at the first Christmas celebrations, until he was joined by John Burdett Wittenoom, the appointed colonial chaplain. Scott was well regarded by the colonists and by Wittenoom, and the settlement of Kelmscott, Western Australia, was named after Scott's birthplace.

Scott continued his homeward journey aboard the William, stopping in Old Batavia where he opened an English chapel. On arriving in England, Scott took charge once again of his parish at Whitfield, where he had installed a curate in his absence, and was later made an honorary canon of Durham. He died at Whitfield on 1 January 1860.

== See also ==
- St James' Church, Sydney
