= John Wollaston Anglican Community School =

Location
- Camillo, Perth, Western Australia; Australia; 32°06′14″S 116°00′25″E

Information
- Type: Independent co-educational primary and secondary day school
- Motto: Seek Wisdom to Know the Truth
- Denomination: Anglicanism
- Established: 1989; 37 years ago
- Oversight: Anglican Schools Commission
- Principal: Tim Russell
- Enrolment: 1,300
- Campus type: Suburban
- Colours: Red, blue, white
- Website: www.jwacs.wa.edu.au

John Wollaston Anglican Community School is an independent Anglican co-educational primary and secondary day school, located in Camillo, Perth, Western Australia.

The school was founded in 1989 and offers Pre-K-12 education. The school contains over 1,300 students with four different house groups, Hale (blue), Charter (green), Scott (yellow), Ramsden (red). In 2014, a new technology centre was opened.

The current Head of School is Tim Russell. The school is named in honour of John Ramsden Wollaston.
