= Canning Mills, Western Australia =

Canning Mills
- Suburb
- Interactive map of Canning Mills
- Coordinates: 32.063°S 116.096°E
- Country: Australia
- State: Western Australia
- City: Perth
- LGA: City of Kalamunda

Government
  - State electorate: Kalamunda
  - Federal division: Bullwinkel

Population
  - Total: 26 (SAL 2016)
- Postcode: 6111
Suburbs around Canning Mills
Orange Grove	Pickering Brook
Martin	Canning Mills
Roleystone		Karragullen

Canning Mills is a suburb of Perth, Western Australia in the City of Kalamunda. The suburb was gazetted on 22 September 1972. Its name relates to the Canning River.

It was the terminus and main destination of the Canning Jarrah Timber Company-constructed Upper Darling Range railway during the early stages of its operation until 1912 when the line was extended.
