= Roleystone, Western Australia =

Roleystone
- Suburb
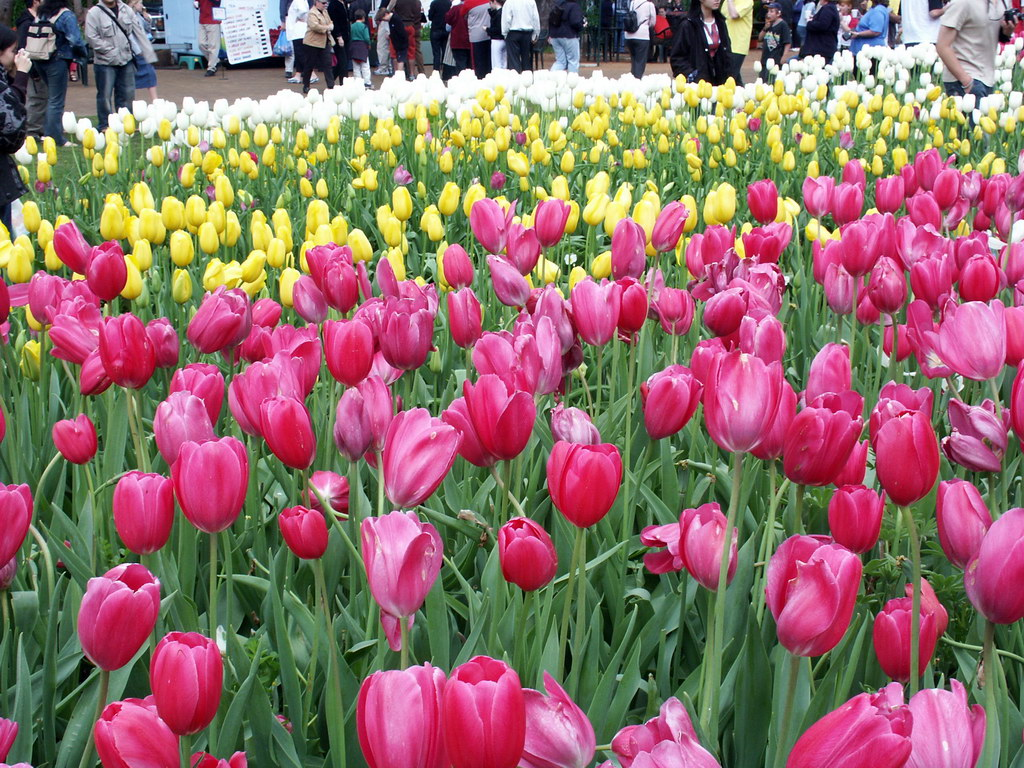
- Araluen Botanic Park
- Interactive map of Roleystone
- Coordinates: 32.091°S 116.122°E
- Country: Australia
- State: Western Australia
- City: Perth
- LGA: City of Armadale
- Location: 30 km (19 mi) SE of Perth; 8 km (5.0 mi) NE of Armadale
- Established: 1900s

Government
  - State electorate: Darling Range
  - Federal division: Bullwinkel

Area
  - Total: 12.2 km^{2} (4.7 sq mi)

Population
  - Total: 6,848 (SAL 2021)
- Postcode: 6111
Suburbs around Roleystone
| Martin | Canning Mills | Karragullen |
| Kelmscott | Roleystone | Karragullen |
| Bedfordale | Ashendon |

Roleystone is a suburb of Perth, Western Australia in the south eastern corridor.

== History ==
In 1830, several grants of land were given to British colonists along the upper Canning River, with Stephen Henty acquiring 5,000 acres and Captain Charles Blisset Churchman obtaining 107 acres. These land grants encompassed what is now Araluen and Roleystone, the name of the latter being derived from "Rolleston", the title Churchman gave his property. The land remained untended with Churchman dying in 1833 and Henty surrendering his land grant in 1841. It was purchased by Thomas Buckingham in 1858, who referred to it as "Rollingstone". The area was also referred to as "The Rolling Stone" and "Rowley Stone" in early police reports.

In 1865, Buckingham built a sawmill, which was located at Sparrow's Place, later known as Butcher's, on the Roleystone Road, about 6.5 kilometres from Kelmscott. The area was subdivided into farmlets in 1902, and was subsequently developed as orchards and market gardens. Buckingham's homestead still stands along with a brick and mortar sheep plunge dip on the property of Araluen Golf Resort. In 1905, Roleystone was opened up for closer settlement, with property brochures extolling the virtues of the scenery and fertile valley soils.

Roleystone is now an area of large residential "R5" zoned properties—with 2000 m^{2} minimum block sizes—surrounded by larger rural properties of native bushland and fruit orchards. The residential gardens, and surrounding council and regional reserves are home to a variety of native wildlife with bandicoots, brushtail possums, shingleback lizards and Children's pythons in relative abundance. Large numbers of western grey kangaroos are found in bush surrounding the suburb.

On 6 February 2011, a declared total fire ban day, a bushfire occurred on private property adjacent to the Brookton Highway in the Roleystone/Kelmscott area. There were a total of 72 homes destroyed and 37 homes damaged. This is the second biggest house loss in Western Australia to a single bushfire event behind the 2016 Waroona–Yarloop bushfire.

== Facilities ==
Roleystone has a number of shops at their Jarrah Road precinct with a grocery store, newsagent, pharmacy, bank and hardware store. Nearby suburbs offer a greater choice of bigger supermarket chains such as Coles or Woolworths. The main suburban residential area to the west of Roleystone is served by a neighbourhood shopping centre, with Stargate Kelmscott and Armadale Shopping City providing other commercial services. The suburb originally contained a primary school (K-5; 1905) and Roleystone District High School (6–10; 1983). The two schools were amalgamated into Roleystone Community College (K-10) after a community consultation process held in 2009, using new and existing buildings on the site of the existing Roleystone District High School, with state government and federal (Building the Education Revolution) funding. The majority of Year 11 and 12 students travel to schools in nearby suburbs, including Kelmscott Senior High School, Lesmurdie Senior High School, Mazenod College and St Brigid's College.

The Araluen Botanic Park and the Araluen Golf Resort are located in the south of the suburb off Croyden Road and are popular picnic and wedding locations, especially during "Springtime at Araluen" when all the flowers are in bloom. Araluen is also known for the Araluen Chilli Festival, which was held in the park each year until 2009. In 2010, the festival was relocated to the Fremantle Esplanade and renamed Araluen's Fremantle Chilli Festival, and since then has continued to be operated by—and to provide funding for—the Araluen Park.

Brookton Highway (State Route 40) runs through Roleystone.

The suburb is served by a number of school bus services and by Transperth bus route 241, which runs every hour during the day, connecting the suburb to Kelmscott railway station and Stargate Kelmscott shopping centre. All services are provided by the Public Transport Authority.

== Transport ==
=== Bus ===
- 241 Kelmscott Station to Kelmscott Station – serves Brookton Highway, Peet Road, Urch Road, Raeburn Road, Holden Road, Northward Road and Westborne Road

== Local sporting clubs ==
Roleystone is home to an Australian rules football club, The Roleystone Tigers. There is both a junior football club (established in 1973) and a senior football club, with the latter having amateur league team. The Roleystone-Karragullen Cricket Club was established in 1950 and currently fields five senior men's and two senior women's teams along with nine junior sides. The Roleystone Country Club is located on Wygonda Road and has views down the Brookton valley.

== Local music and arts ==
Roleystone is home to the Roleystone Musicians Club. The club was established in March 2007.

Kevin Peek, a guitarist and member of the band Sky, named a Sky song after Roleystone, his home town.

Roleystone is also the home of the Roleystone Theatre – both the venue and the group. The group was formed in 1933 as the Roleystone Choral and Dramatic society, with a name change in the 1970s to the Roleystone Theatre Group. The Group is a community theatre presenting plays and musicals throughout each year.

The Roleystone Theatre (venue), first built by Roleystone and Karragullen residents in 1922 and now owned by the City of Armadale, is currently closed for remedial building works (2018 to 2022). The Roleystone Theatre Group was utilising the Roleystone Hall as their temporary home until early 2022, however until the theatre is re-built and re-opened they do not have a performance venue. It is hoped the revitalised theatre building will open in 2023.

Another notable cultural group in Roleystone is the Bohemian Club of Roleystone, an exclusive collective dedicated to celebrating 1960s and 1970s counterculture. Founded in Roleystone, the club blends bohemian lifestyle with a passion for psychedelic arts, music, and free-spirited expression.

Members engage in psychedelic exploration, drawing inspiration from Aleister Crowley and Thelema, and regularly host gatherings that incorporate esoteric practices and artistic expression.

== Local news media ==
There is one local newspapers/magazine: the Roleystone Courier. This monthly magazine is owned and created by a local resident.

Additionally, The Roleystone Times, an independent local online news website founded by Roleystone Media Group, offers up-to-date coverage of local events, news, and community stories. It is affiliated with the Bohemian Club of Roleystone.
