= Kelmscott, Western Australia =

Kelmscott Goolamrup (Nyungar)
- Suburb
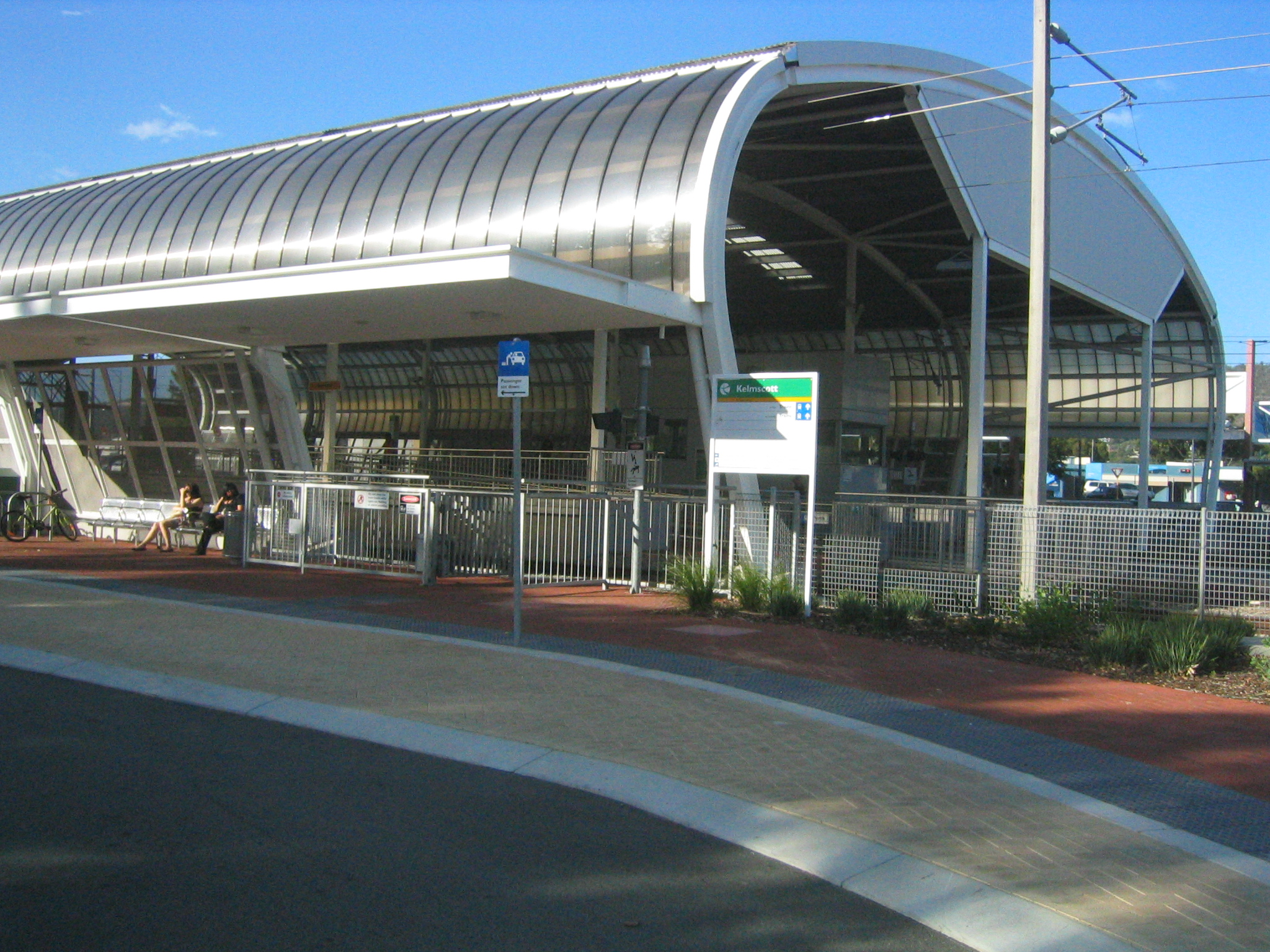
- Kelmscott railway station
- Interactive map of Kelmscott
- Coordinates: 32.119°S 116.026°E
- Country: Australia
- State: Western Australia
- City: Perth
- LGA: City of Armadale
- Location: 23 km (14 mi) SE of Perth; 5 km (3.1 mi) N of Armadale
- Established: 1830

Government
  - State electorate: Armadale
  - Federal division: Burt

Area
  - Total: 14.9 km^{2} (5.8 sq mi)

Population
  - Total: 10,575 (SAL 2021)
- Postcode: 6111
Suburbs around Kelmscott
Champion Lakes	Martin	Martin
Camillo	Kelmscott	Roleystone
Seville Grove	Armadale	Mount Nasura

Kelmscott is a southeastern suburb of Perth, Western Australian within the local government area of the City of Armadale. It is 23 kilometres (14 mi) southeast of Perth along the Albany Highway.

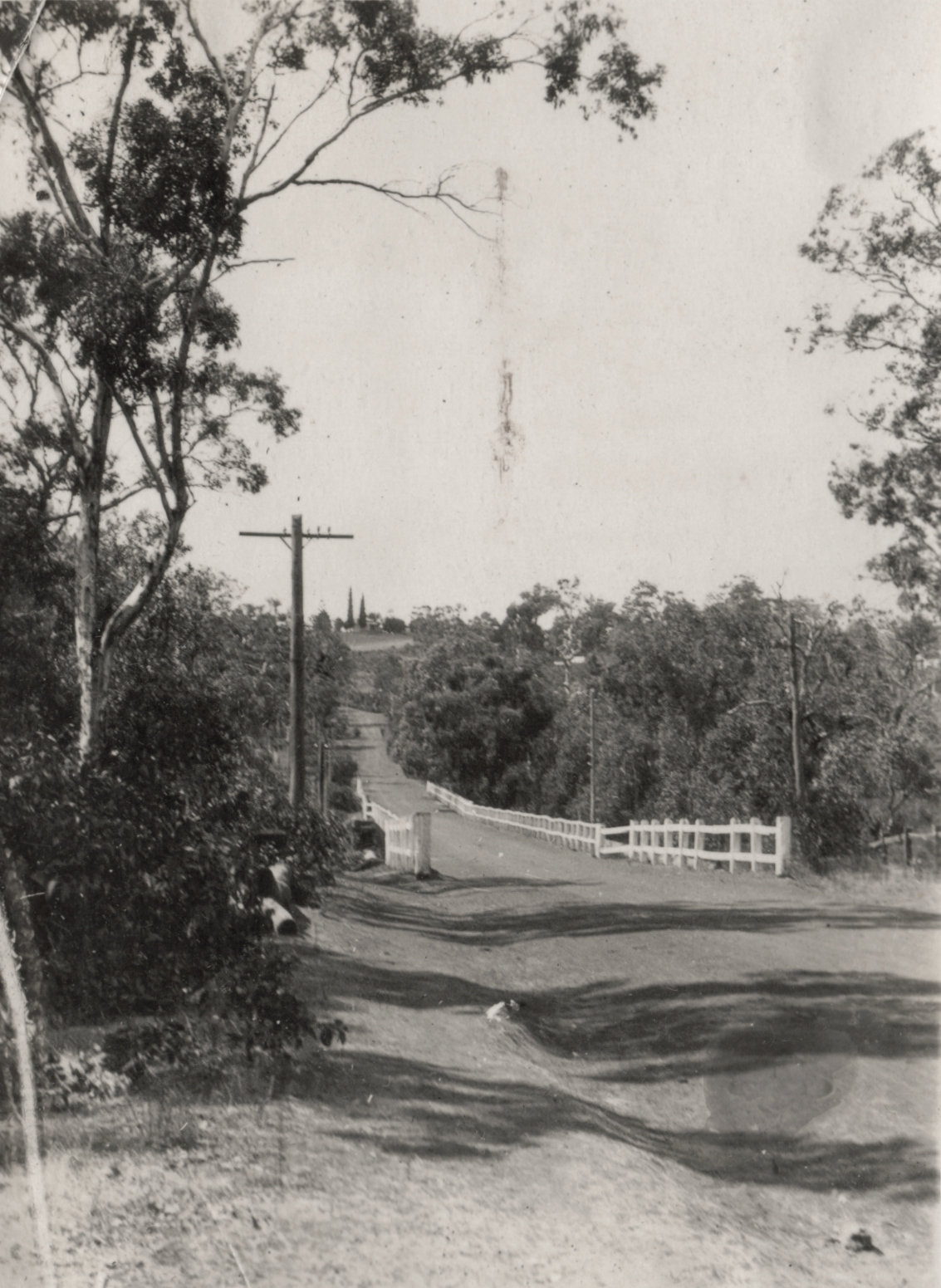
Bridge below the school, Kelmscott, Western Australia, 23 March 1928

Kelmscott was one of four initial townsites established in the Swan River Colony. It was named after Kelmscott, Oxfordshire, the birthplace of the first Anglican clergyman in the colony, Thomas Hobbes Scott (1783–1860).

The suburb of Kelmscott is bisected by the Canning River. On the western side of the river is the flat coastal plain upon which most of Perth is situated. This area includes the Stargate Kelmscott and Kelmscott Village shopping areas along Albany Highway, the light industrial area, the Kelmscott Senior High School and a residential area. To the east, the suburb rises into the western Darling Scarp.

Kelmscott celebrated its 175th anniversary on 9 October 2005.

Kelmscott is home of the first Red Rooster restaurant.

== History ==
=== Pre-colonial history ===
Before European settlement, Kelmscott and the wider area was inhabited by the Whadjuk Noongars people, an Aboriginal ethnic group. During this time, Kelmscott was called by the Whadjuks as "Goolamrup".

=== Colonial period ===
In November 1829, the Governor of the newly established Swan River Colony, James Stirling, led an expedition to choose a site of a new town along the Canning river. Kelmscott was then founded on 6 July 1830, and was named after Kelmscott, Oxfordshire, the birthplace of first Anglican clergyman in the colony Thomas Hobbes Scott. The first building constructed in the new town was a soldier's barracks, which survived until the 1930s. The first land grants given out were to Charles Wright and John Adam, who left in 1933 and 1931 respectively. Two streams in Kelmscott, Wright's Stream and Adam's Stream, were named after them. In addition, a lake was named after Charles Wright.

1830, John Atkinson was appointed to survey Kelmscott and drew up the first plan.

In its early history, Kelmscott served as a pitstop along a track which ran from Perth to Albany. In 1836, a new track called King George's Sound Road was built from Kelmscott to Albany. The road later became Albany road, before eventually becoming Albany highway.

In September 1831, Theophilus Ellis was appointed the government resident at Kelmscott. Ellis served as a captain in 14th Regiment of Light Dragoons during the Peninsular and Napoleonic wars. In December, he attempted to raise a unit of the Yeomanry Cavalry for the area, but was dismissed by Stirling. Another soldier tried again in May 1833 but was again dismissed. Ellis went on to die in the Pinjarra massacre and was the first police officer appointed in WA.

In 1856, Henry Gibb and Thomas Saw established an inn (modern Narrogin Inn) which holds one of WA's oldest liquor trading licences. In 1894, the Kelmscott Roads Board was separated from the Canning Roads Board.

=== Modern history ===
In 1972, Greek migrant Peter Kailis established the first Red Rooster restaurant along with nine partners. Kailis then managed to buy out the other nine to become the sole owner.

On 9 October 2005, Kelmscott celebrated its 175th anniversary. The highlight of the celebrations was the running of the Hotham Valley Railway steam locomotive Pm706 from Perth railway station to Kelmscott station, with stops at Cannington, Gosnells, then Armadale station. This was the first running of steam "under the wires" on the Transperth network for some time. The event was specially arranged by the Public Transport Authority, whose Minister is also the member of parliament for the local electorate.

==== 2011 bushfire ====
On 6 February 2011, a declared total fire ban day, Robert James Stevens, 56, an ex-policeman, was using an angle grinder at his home and started the fire on his private property adjacent to the Brookton Highway in the Roleystone / Kelmscott area. A total of 72 homes were destroyed and 37 homes damaged. This is the single biggest house loss in Western Australia to a single bushfire event. Remarkably, 28 per cent of residents in Kelmscott and Roleystone left their homes only just in time and were not alerted.

Stevens was charged under the Bushfire Act with one count of carrying out an activity in the open air that causes or is likely to cause a fire, and pleaded not guilty. Due to a legal technicality associated with complexities in how the total fire ban was declared, charges were dropped, and Stevens was then awarded $4250 to cover his legal costs. His home was saved by firefighters.

Some Kelmscott residents managed to return to their homes in the fire zone, as described by Premier Colin Barnett, and could be seen on their balconies giving hope to fellow residents that their properties were safe.

== Education ==
- John Wollaston Anglican Community School - an independent Anglican co-educational primary and secondary school founded in 1989 offering K-12 education
- Kelmscott Primary School (1882) - one of the first primary schools established in Western Australia.
- Kelmscott Senior High School (1973) years 7–12.
- Clifton Hills Primary School (1972)
- Good Shepherd Catholic Primary School (1977)
- Sowilo Community High School (2000) - independent school for young people at educational risk

== Annual events ==
- The Kelmscott Show, run by the Kelmscott Agricultural Society, has been held annually since 1897 (with the exception of the years 1930-1938 and 2020 due to the Coronavirus Pandemic).

== Transportation ==
Kelmscott contains two major highways:

- Albany Highway (State Route 30) – south to Pinjarra and Bunbury.
- Brookton Highway (State Route 40) - east to Brookton.

The Albany highway stretches from Gosnells in the north to Armadale in the south and divides Kelmscott into two. At the southern boundary is located an intersection between the Albany and Brookton highways. The 2011 bushfire destroyed Buckingham Bridge of the Brookton highway in Kelmscott. A replacement was opened in 2013. As part of Metronet, level crossings over the Armadale Line in Kelmscott were closed and turned into underpasses.

Opened in 1893, the Kelmscott railway station is located in Kelmscott's CBD as part of the Armadale line.

=== Bus ===
- 219 Kelmscott Station to Armadale Station – serves Davis Road and Albany Highway
- 220 Armadale Station to Perth Busport – serves Albany Highway
- 221 Armadale Station to Cannington Station – serves Albany Highway
- 240 Kelmscott Station to Kelmscott Station – Circular Route, serves Davis Road, Albany Highway, Gilwell Avenue, Martin Street, Merilee Terrace, Morundah Place, Taronga Drive, Turner Road, Brookside Avenue, Blackburne Drive, Connell Avenue and Lucich Street
- 241 Kelmscott Station to Kelmscott Station – Circular Route, serves Davis Road, Albany Highway and Brookton Highway
- 243 Kelmscott Station to Armadale Station – serves Third Avenue, Cammillo Road, Westfield Road and Champion Drive
- 244 Kelmscott Station to Armadale Station – serves Third Avenue and Champion Drive
- 245 Kelmscott Station to Armadale Station – serves Westfield Road
- 907 Armadale Station to Cannington Station (high frequency / limited stops) – serves Railway Avenue, Challis Station and Kelmscott Station

=== Rail ===
- Armadale Line
  - Kelmscott Station
  - Challis Station
