= Ashendon, Western Australia =

Ashendon Perth, Western Australia
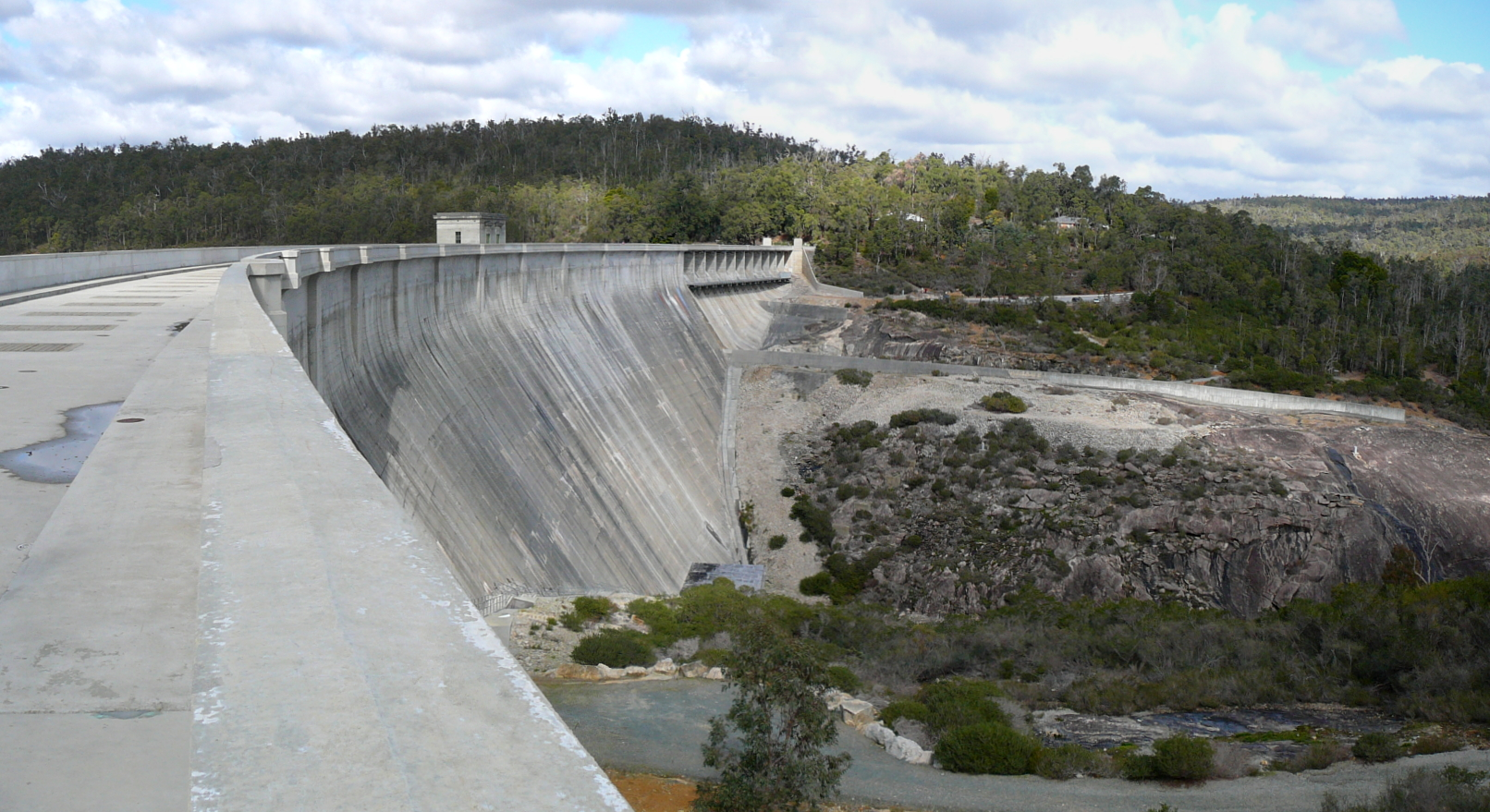
- Canning Dam
- Coordinates: 32.212°S 116.191°E
- Population: 3 (SAL 2021)
- Established: 2006
- Postcode(s): 6111
- Area: 210 km^{2} (81.1 sq mi)
- Location: 44 km (27 mi) from Perth
- LGA(s): City of Armadale
- State electorate(s): Darling Range
- Federal division(s): Canning
Suburbs around Ashendon:
Roleystone	Roleystone	Karragullen
Bedfordale	Ashendon
Bedfordale	Bedfordale

Ashendon is a suburb of Perth, Western Australia, located within the City of Armadale. It was gazetted in 2006 and was formerly part of Karragullen. The main road through Ashendon is McNess Drive, by which the main public entrance to the Canning Dam weir and picnic area can be accessed.
