= Kelmscott Senior High School =

Location
- Kelmscott, Perth, Western Australia; Australia; 32°07′18″S 116°00′39″E

Information
- Type: Public co-educational high day school
- Motto: Strive for Excellence
- Established: 1973; 53 years ago
- Educational authority: WA Department of Education
- Principal: Mark Jeffery
- Enrolment: 1,284 (2021)
- Campus type: Suburban
- Website: kshs.wa.edu.au

Kelmscott Senior High School is a public co-educational high day school, located on Camillo Road in Kelmscott, a suburb of Perth, Western Australia.

== Overview ==
The school was established in 1973 and caters for students in Year 7 to Year 12.

The school enrolled 1,560 students in 2007, then 1,562 in 2008, to 1,573 in 2009, then fell to 1,379 in 2010 and to 1,439 in 2011. The fall in student numbers from 2010 is a result of the enrolment age changing for students entering high school in Western Australia.

The school won the Kim Hughes shield for the secondary school champion cricket team in Western Australia in 1987. The girls cricket team also won the Super 8 competition in 2002, 2003 and from 2005 to 2008.

== Notable alumni ==
- Brendon Ah Chee – Australian rules footballer
- Trent Sainsbury – association footballer
- Riley Woodcock – association footballer
- Courtney Bruce – Australian Diamond netballer
- Rita Saffioti – politician
- Callum Ah Chee – Australian rules footballer
- Kiara Bowers – AFLW footballer
- Antonio Buti – politician
- Alex Foot (Kaikobad)- Electronic producer and musician)

== See also ==
- List of schools in the Perth metropolitan area
