= Araluen Botanic Park =

Heritage listed botanic garden in Roleystone, Western Australia

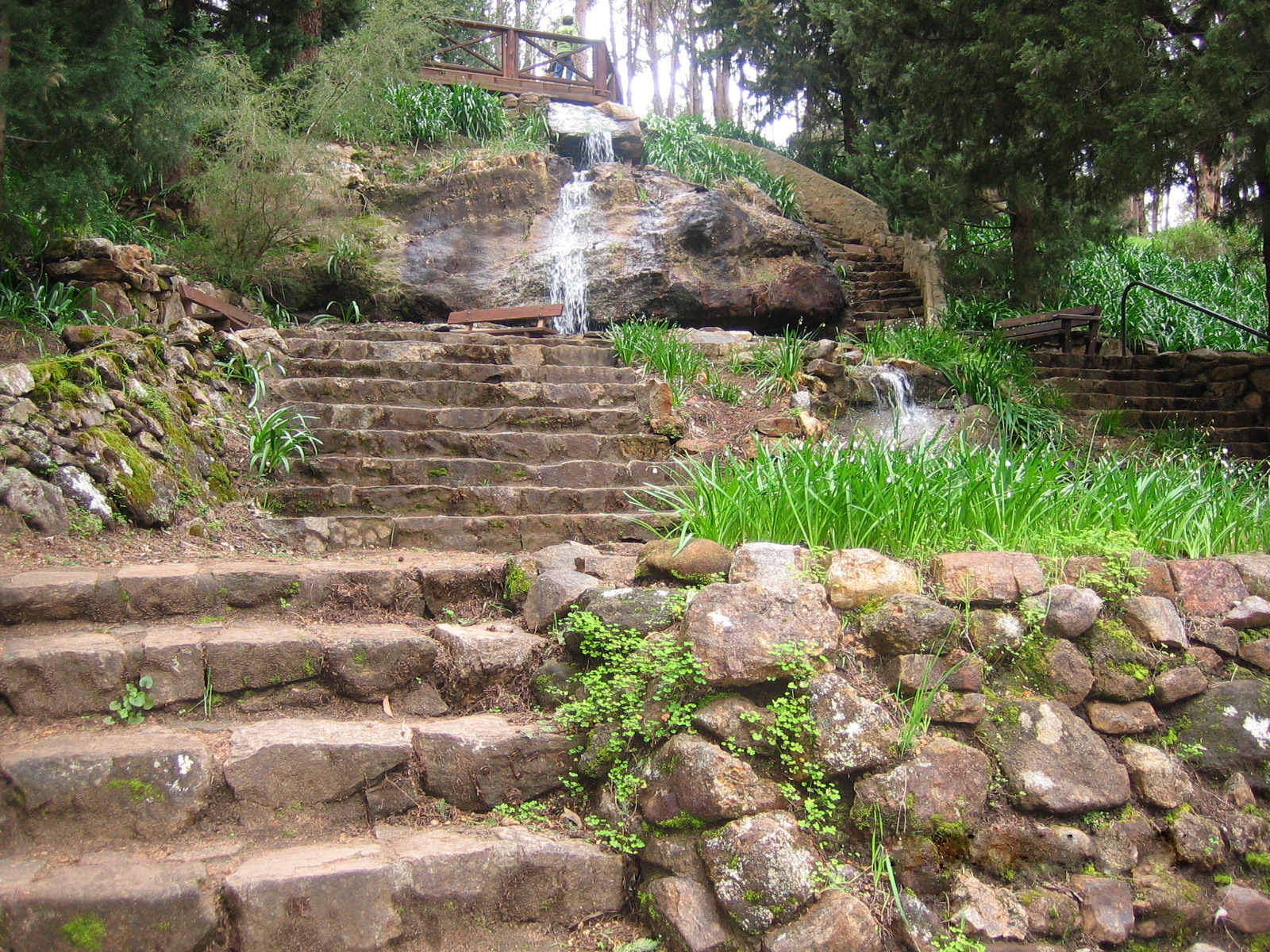
- Interactive map of Araluen Botanic Park
- Type: Botanical
- Location: Roleystone, Western Australia
- Coordinates: 32°07′S 116°06′E
- Area: 59 ha (150 acres)
- Opened: 1930
- Owner: Araluen Botanic Park Foundation
- Website: araluenbotanicpark.com.au

Western Australia Heritage Register
- Designated: 12 December 1997
- Reference no.: 3277

Araluen Botanic Park is located in a sheltered valley in the Darling Ranges, approximately 30 kilometres (19 mi) south of Perth, Western Australia, in the suburb of Roleystone. The Botanical Park covers an area of about 59 hectares (150 acres). There is a small entry fee to the park, and it is open every day of the year. There is a mixture of exotic plant varieties, however the park also contains many remnants of native bush.

== History ==
Jack Simons bought the property in 1929 on behalf of the Young Australia League (YAL) to use as a holiday camp. The site was officially opened in November 1931 by state attorney-general Thomas Davy. It was named in honour of Henry Kendall's poem "Araluen", referring to Araluen, New South Wales, and said to mean "running water" in an Indigenous language of New South Wales.

The YAL put the Araluen Botanic Gardens up for sale in 1985 (but retained Camp Simons). A private investor was going to redevelop the land, however the local communities rallied the state government to purchase the park. Encouraged by strong community support, the state government purchased the park in 1990. The Araluen Botanic Park Foundation became incorporated in July 1990 with the aim of working with the Western Australian Planning Commission to restore the park. Since 1995, the foundation has managed the park under lease from the commission.

== Facilities ==
Facilities include a gift shop, cafe with tearooms and function centre, parking, toilets, a miniature train and walkways. The old swimming pool is now a lake and the diving board has been removed.

== Events ==
Araluen hosts annual events, including the Tulip Festival in spring and the Fremantle Chilli Festival in summer at Fremantle Esplanade and the Fremantle Fishing Boat Harbour. From 1997 till 2007 an annual folk music festival was also held each spring in Araluen. Children's activity days are held during school holidays. Araluen recently sponsored the ANZMAC Mid-year Doctoral Colloquium Event.

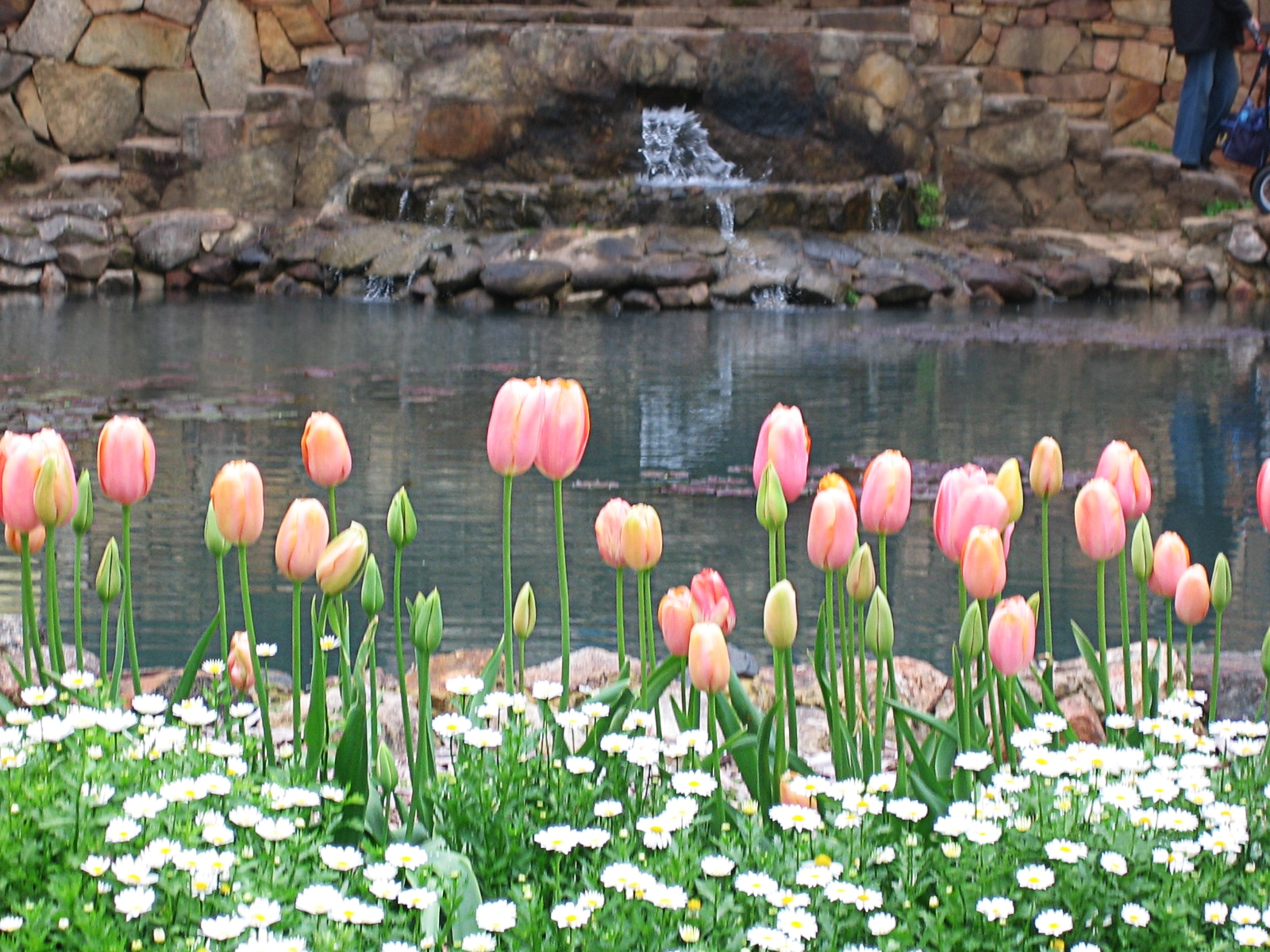

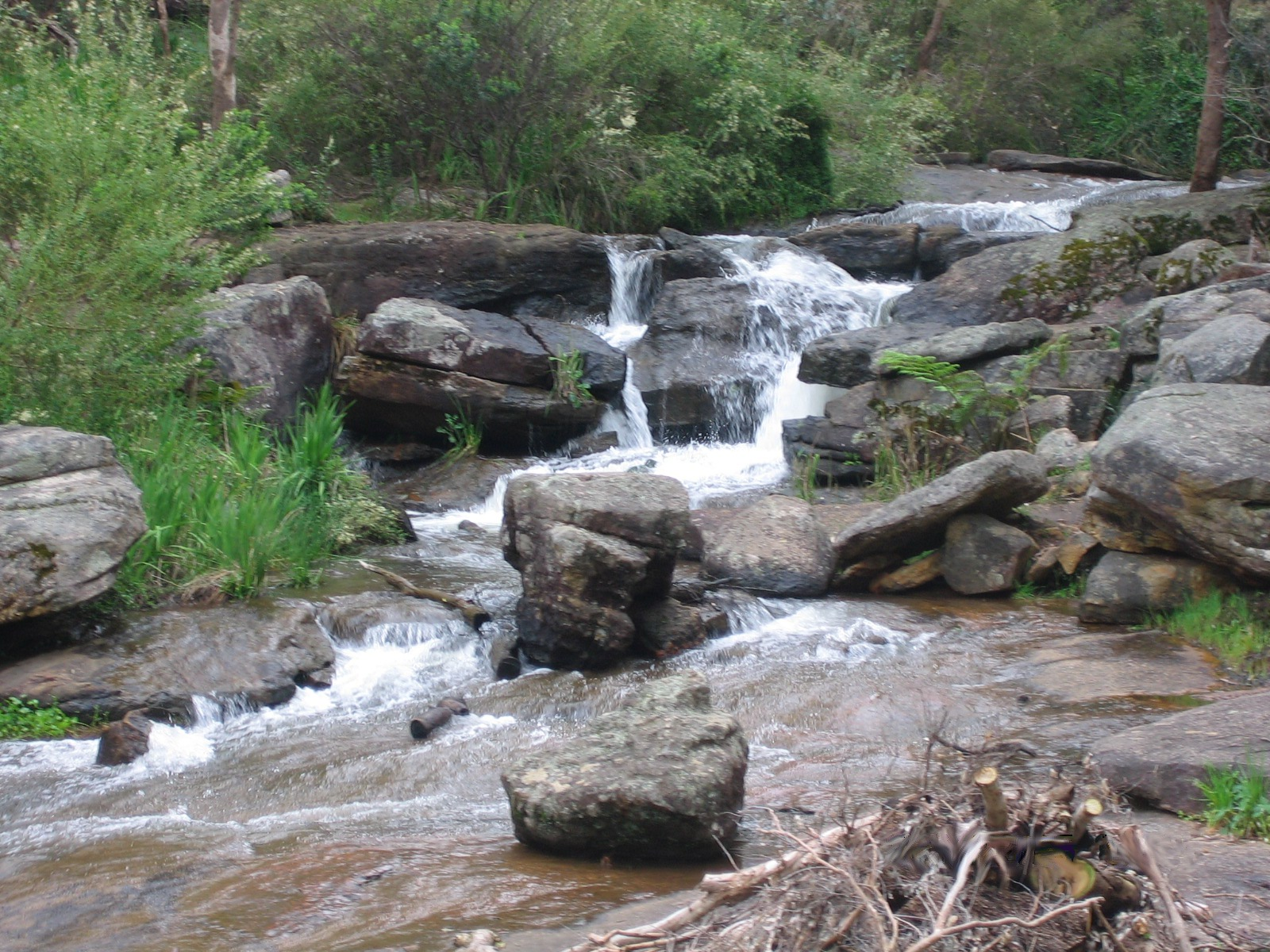

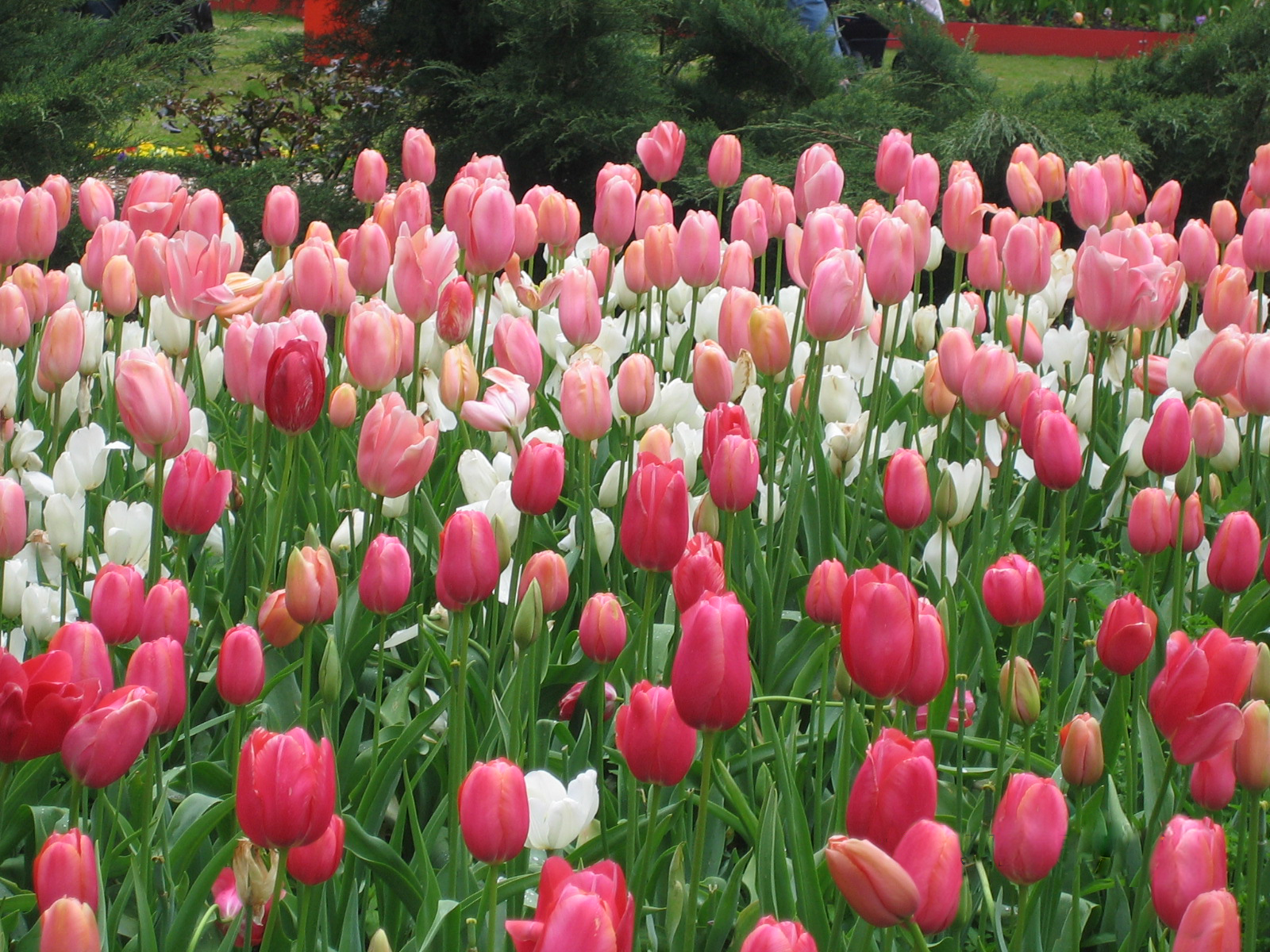

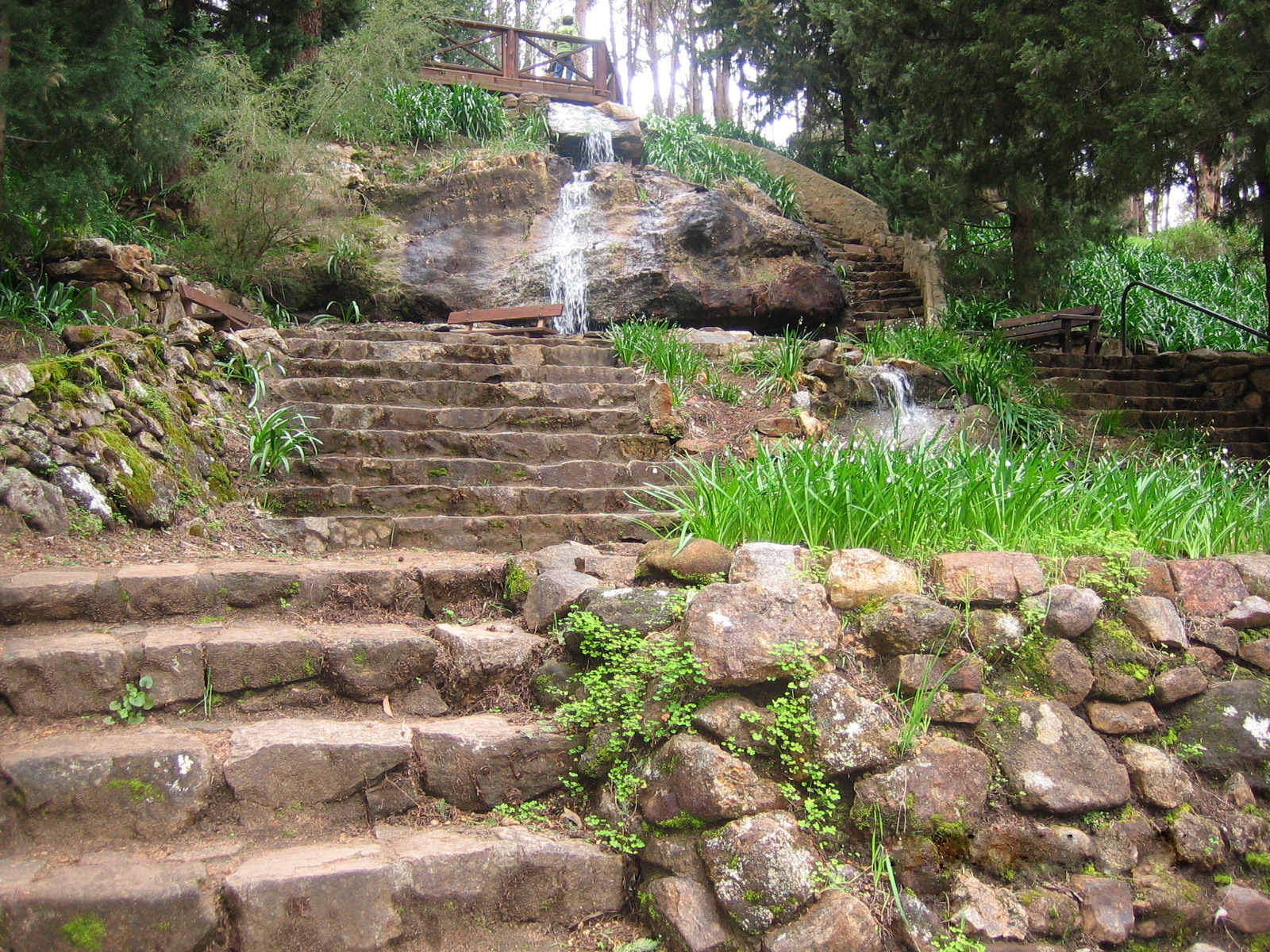
