= West Dale, Western Australia =

Westdale
- Town
- Coordinates: 32°19′S 116°37′E
- Country: Australia
- State: Western Australia
- LGA(s): Shire of Beverley
- Location: 93 km (58 mi) ESE of Perth; 44 km (27 mi) south west of Beverley
- Established: 1971

Government
  - State electorate(s): Central Wheatbelt
  - Federal division(s): Pearce

Area
  - Total: 174.2 km^{2} (67.3 sq mi)
- Elevation: 281 m (922 ft)

Population
  - Total(s): 93 (SAL 2021)
- Postcode: 6304

Westdale or West Dale is a locality near the Beverley-Westdale road in the Wheatbelt region of Western Australia, 93 kilometres (58 mi) from Perth. The locality was referred to as West Dale, Beverley in publications in the twentieth century.

The area was settle for farming in the early 1900s, and by 1906 the local progress association requested that land be set aside for a townsite. A railway through the area had been considered but did not eventuate so the land remained uninhabited. A school was built in the area in 1967 and the townsite was eventually gazetted in 1971.

The locality takes its name from the Dale River, which had been named after Ensign Robert Dale, who explored the area in 1831.
