= Martin, Western Australia =

Martin
- Suburb
- Interactive map of Martin
- Coordinates: 32.071°S 116.037°E
- Country: Australia
- State: Western Australia
- City: Perth
- LGA: City of Gosnells

Government
  - State electorate: Kalamunda
  - Federal division: Bullwinkel

Population
  - Total: 1,854 (SAL 2021)
- Postcode: 6110
Suburbs around Martin
| Maddington | Orange Grove | Canning Mills |
| Gosnells | Martin | Canning Mills |
| Kelmscott | Kelmscott | Roleystone |

Martin is a suburb of Perth, Western Australia, located within the City of Gosnells. It was named in 1974 after a pioneer family of the Gosnells district, and in particular Edward Victor Martin who had served for 37 years on the council.

Martin was formerly the location of the popular tourist attraction Cohuna Koala Park owned and run by the Sorbello family at 322 Mills Road East. International visitors such as Sir David Attenborough, Dolly Parton, Michael Jackson and Colonel Harland Sanders visited Cohuna during its time located in Martin. The site is now the location of the Kaarakin Black Cockatoo Conservation Centre.

== Transport ==
=== Bus ===
- 228 Gosnells Station to Thornlie Station – serves Gosnells Road
