= WAGR G class G233 Leschenault Lady =

Preserved Australian steam locomotive

G233 Leschenault Lady
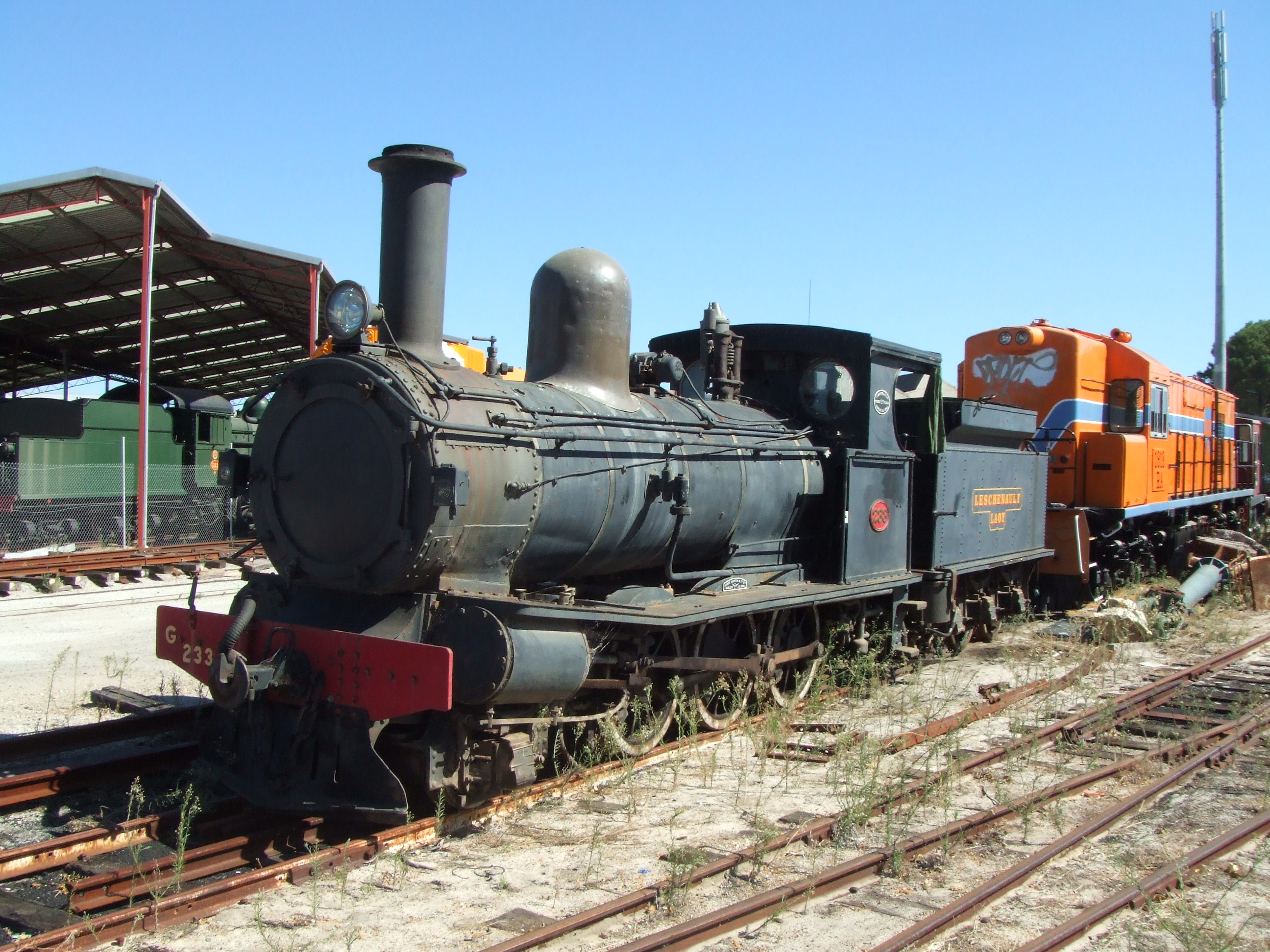
- Leschenault Lady at the Railway Museum, Bassendean, in 2006
Type and origin
- Power type: Steam
- Designer: Beyer, Peacock & Co
- Builder: James Martin & Co
Specifications
- Configuration
  - Whyte: 2-6-0 "Mogul"
  - UIC: 1'C
- Gauge: 3 ft 6 in (1,067 mm)
- Driver dia.: 3 ft 3 in (991 mm)
- Length: 39 ft 0 in (11.89 m)
- Width: 6 ft 11.8 in (2.13 m)
- Height: 11 ft 5.8 in (3.50 m)
- Total weight: 42 long tons 2 cwt (94,300 lb or 42.8 t)
- Fuel type: Coal
- Water cap.: 1,600 imp gal (7,300 L; 1,900 US gal)
- Boiler pressure: 160 lbf/in^{2} (1.10 MPa)
- Cylinder size: 14.5 in × 20 in (368 mm × 508 mm)
Performance figures
- Tractive effort: 13,801 lbf (61.39 kN)
Career
- Operators: Western Australian Government Railways; Leschenault Railway Preservation Society; Rail Heritage WA
- Numbers: G233
- Official name: Leschenault Lady
- First run: 13 November 1898
- Current owner: Rail Heritage WA
- Disposition: Operational

WAGR G class G233 Leschenault Lady is a preserved 2-6-0 steam locomotive, built in 1898 by James Martin & Co of Gawler, South Australia, for the Western Australian Government Railways (WAGR). It is the third oldest Australian-built steam locomotive still in operational order after ex-Victorian Railways Y112 and ex-South Australian Railways Yx141.

== Background ==
Between 1889 and 1899, a total of 48 G class engines were acquired by the WAGR, both new and second-hand. They were designed by Beyer, Peacock & Co of Manchester, England, but most of them were built by James Martin & Co at Gawler, a short distance north of Adelaide, South Australia.

The G class engines were the first locomotive class to be introduced to the WAGR network in quantity, and were part of what became almost an Australian 3 ft 6 in (1,067 mm) standard. Initially, the WAGR used them as main line general purpose locomotives, on passenger, mixed and goods trains.

== Service history ==
G233 was one of the G class locomotives built by James Martin & Co. It was also one of the 24 members of the class constructed in 2-6-0 configuration. The single axle wheelset at the front of the 2-6-0 G class engines had a tendency to derail when at speed. Later G class locomotives were therefore built as 4-6-0-type engines with a four wheel leading bogie, which solved that issue.

For the first few years after G233 entered service on 13 November 1898, it was used as a main line locomotive on the principal WAGR network radiating from Perth. However, the G class engines were quickly displaced from main line service by more powerful locomotives.

In 1909, G233 was one of five locomotives sent to operate the isolated Hopetoun to Ravensthorpe railway line on the south coast of the State. That line, which was constructed to serve goldfields near Ravensthorpe, opened during 1909, and G233 began running on it on 8 September of that year. As traffic on the line was not substantial, the locomotive roster operating it was soon reduced to just two locomotives, G233 being one of them.

After the Hopetoun–Ravensthorpe railway closed in 1935, G233 stayed there as its only remaining locomotive until November 1943, when the WAGR began dismantling the line. The locomotive was then sent in crates to Newdegate, the terminus of a wheatbelt railway line from Wagin via Lake Grace.

Following the end of World War II, the crates containing G233 were taken to Midland Railway Workshops, where the locomotive was reassembled. By the 1960s, it had made its way to Bunbury, where it was used as a jetty shunter and on other duties, such as taking coal wagons to and from the powerhouse. G233 also spent some time at Kalgoorlie and Fremantle. Although G233 had proved to be extraordinarily durable, it also often struggled with the loads it hauled on goods services in the Bunbury area.

== Preservation ==
In 1967–68, with the full dieselisation of the Bunbury area in progress, the WAGR began collecting old passenger carriages from around the South West to be scrapped. George Baxter, manager of the Bunbury tourist bureau, lobbied hard for the preservation of a locally based steam-hauled train. With support from Bunbury politicians, he and others began a project to restore G233 and three dilapidated carriages, which were dubbed "The Vintage Train". In 1973, matching grants from the Western Australian government and the Australian Tourism Commission funded a general overhaul of G233.

Meanwhile, a competition held in 1969 to determine a name for G233 attracted 487 entries. The winning suggestion was made by Bunbury Senior High School student Mark Hutchinson from Burekup, then aged 15. At a ceremony held on 9 October 1969 and attended by around 100 people, the then Minister for Railways, Ray O'Connor, formally conferred the name Leschenault Lady on G233, as a tribute to the French botanist Jean-Baptiste Leschenault de La Tour, whose name has long been associated with the Bunbury area. Leschenault de La Tour was the botanist on Nicolas Baudin's expedition to Australia between 1800 and 1803, and Leschenault Inlet was named in his honour.

In the 1970s and 1980s, Leschenault Lady hauled many Vintage Train trips around the South West, to destinations including Collie, Donnybrook and Busselton. The trips were so successful that the Leschenault Railway Preservation Society, which had been formed to operate the Vintage Train, acquired a second G class locomotive, and named it Koombana Queen. Leschenault Lady also took part in a number of commemorative events, including the welcome of the first Indian Pacific train to Perth in 1970 and the Centenary of the WAGR celebration in Geraldton in 1979. In 1981, Leschenault Lady operated trains in Perth to celebrate the centenary of the Fremantle to Guildford line. In the mid-1980s, the locomotive, temporarily repainted green instead of its usual black, even appeared in the miniseries of Albert Facey's autobiography, A Fortunate Life.

In 1985, the Bunbury rail yards and station were closed as part of a redevelopment of the city centre. The goods shed and a portion of the roundhouse were relocated, piece by piece, to railway land leased by the Preservation Society at the nearby town of Boyanup. At that site, a museum, the Boyanup Transport Museum, was opened, with the partially rebuilt roundhouse being used to house the Vintage Train. Leschenault Lady continued to haul the Vintage Train on outings. Destinations included the Donnybrook Apple Festival and the Vintage Rail days at Yarloop. In 1988, the locomotive spent a year in service at Dwellingup on the Hotham Valley Railway.

In 1992, the Preservation Society found itself unable to continue and decided to shut down. It transferred its land lease and assets to the Western Australian division of the Australian Railway Historical Society, which now trades as Rail Heritage WA (RHWA). In 1994, Leschenault Lady participated in celebrations in Geraldton marking the centenary of the Midland Railway of Western Australia. In October 1995, the WAGR, which had long since adopted the trading name Westrail, transferred ownership of Leschenault Lady and the rest of the Vintage Train to RHWA.

By then, the insurance and regulatory complexities of running a steam train on main lines were making operations of the Vintage Train increasingly difficult and expensive. Leschenault Lady was sent to Perth, where it operated a few tourist services. In 1999, RHWA volunteers overhauled the locomotive at the former Midland Railway Workshops. Following that overhaul, which included replacement of the boiler tubes, no work was available for Leschenault Lady in the South West, and so it was loaned to the Golden Mile Loopline Railway in Boulder from 2001 to 2005. After that arrangement concluded, the locomotive was displayed for a short time at RHWA's Railway Museum in Bassendean; in April 2007, it was returned to the museum at Boyanup, which had been closed in 2005.

In 2012, the Boyanup museum was reopened, under the new name "South West Rail and Heritage Centre". The question most frequently asked by local visitors to the reopened museum was, 'What's happening to Leschenault Lady, are you going to restore it?' The following year, 2013, RHWA volunteers began dismantling the locomotive so that the boiler could be sent away for repairs, and the rusted ashpan could be replaced. In early 2014, the boiler, which weighs 8.5 tonnes (9.4 tons), was crane lifted from Leschenault Lady's frames and sent off to Cutts Engineering in Manjimup for ultrasound testing, repairs and some updating. The boiler stays were replaced, a new ashpan was fabricated, and a new smokebox was fitted. Meanwhile, RHWA volunteers worked on the underframe, and local business Piacentini & Sons undertook an off-site restoration of the locomotive's tender.

In December 2020, the boiler passed its cold-water pressure test. The following month, Piacentini sent the tender back to the museum. On 22 August 2021, the locomotive returned to steam, as part of celebrations marking the sesquicentenary of railways in Western Australia. Now that the locomotive is steaming again, RHWA will run it up and down the small length of track at the museum. RHWA is also hoping to secure a short section of the former WAGR line to Capel and Busselton, to take passengers on a longer ride and relive memories of the Vintage Train. As the locomotive weighs only about 40 tons with coal, it is also feasible to move it by truck to special events.

== See also ==
- Ballaarat steam engine
- History of rail transport in Western Australia
- List of Western Australian locomotive classes
