= The Kalgoorlie =

Former railway service in Western Australia

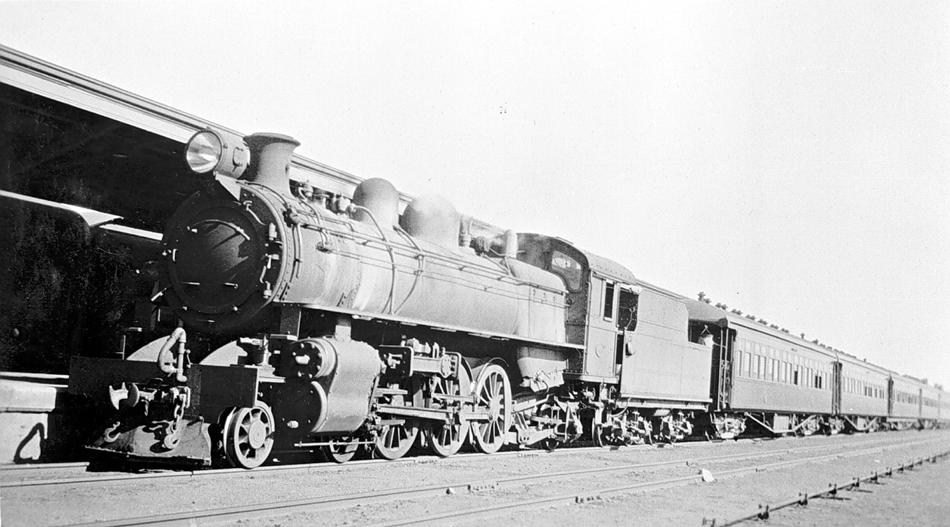
- P class locomotive with the Kalgoorlie Express at Kalgoorlie station in 1935

Overview
- Service type: Overnight passenger train
- Status: Ceased
- First service: 3 December 1962
- Last service: 28 November 1971
- Successor: The Prospector
- Former operator: Western Australian Government Railways

Route
- Termini: Perth; Kalgoorlie
- Distance travelled: 611 kilometres
- Average journey time: 14 hours
- Service frequency: 6 x weekly
- Train number: 85/86
- Lines used: Eastern; Eastern Goldfields

The Kalgoorlie was a railway passenger service operated by the Western Australian Government Railways between November 1962 and November 1971.

== Earlier services ==
Following the opening of the Eastern Goldfields Railway to Kalgoorlie in December 1887, passenger services from Perth commenced.

Although not officially named, the service was often referred to as the Great Eastern Express, Kalgoorlie Express or the Kalgoorlie Passenger.

Following the opening of the Trans-Australian Railway in October 1917, the service's importance increased with the commencement of the Trans-Australian Express from Port Augusta in South Australia.

By May 1921, a separate overnight express (later named The Westland) for interstate passengers and mail was introduced and it became the connecting train with the Trans-Australian Express.

== The Kalgoorlie ==
The existing service remained to service intrastate passengers and was named The Kalgoorlie on 3 December 1962. Following the conversion of the Eastern and Eastern Goldfields lines to standard gauge, The Kalgoorlie was scheduled to be replaced by The Prospector. However delays in delivery of new rolling stock saw the existing narrow gauge service continue.

As it was the only narrow gauge train traversing the Northam to Merredin section of the Eastern line, it was diverted via the Goomalling to West Merredin railway line in October 1970 to allow the old narrow gauge line to close. The Kalgoorlie last ran on 28 November 1971.

== Ship namesake ==
In the 1890s and early 1900s a coastal steamer in Australia was known as The Kalgoorlie.

== See also ==
- The Westland
