= List of acts of the Parliament of Western Australia from 1896 =

This is a list of acts of the Parliament of Western Australia for the year 1896.

== 1896 ==
=== Public acts ===
Short title, or popular name	Citation	Royal assent
Long title
	60 Vict. No. 1	22 July 1896
An Act to apply out of the Consolidated Revenue Fund the sum of Two Hundred and Fifty Thousand Pounds (Note: £250,000 in 1896 is equivalent to A$44,900,000 in 2022.) to the Service of the Year ending 30th June, 1897.
Companies Act 1893 Amendment Act 1896	60 Vict. No. 2	23 September 1896
An Act to amend the Companies Act, 1893. (Note: Companies Act 1893 (56 Vict. No. 8))
Powers of Attorney Act 1896	60 Vict. No. 3	23 September 1896
An Act to confirm certain Expenditure for the year ending 30th June, One thousand eight hundred and ninety-five.
	60 Vict. No. 4	
Agricultural Bank Act 1894 Amendment Act 1896	60 Vict. No. 5	
Adoption of Children Act 1896	60 Vict. No. 6	
Federal Council Reference Act 1896	60 Vict. No. 7	
Married Women's Property Act 1896	60 Vict. No. 8	
Streets and Roads Closure (Eastern Railway) Act 1896	60 Vict. No. 9	
Summary Jurisdiction (Married Women) Act 1896	60 Vict. No. 10	
Municipal Institutions Act 1895 Amendment Act 1896	60 Vict. No. 11	
Coolgardie Goldfields Water Supply Loan Act 1896	60 Vict. No. 12	23 September 1896
An Act to authorise the raising of a sum of Two Million Five Hundred Thousand Pounds (Note: £2,500,000 in 1896 is equivalent to A$449,000,000 in 2022.) by Loan, for the purpose of providing a Permanent Water Supply for the Coolgardie Goldfields.
Customs Duties Repeal Act 1896	60 Vict. No. 13	
Tobacco (Unmanufactured) Duty Act 1896	60 Vict. No. 14	
Post Office Savings Bank Act 1896	60 Vict. No. 15	
	60 Vict. No. 16	30 September 1896
An Act to authorise the Closing of certain Roads and Streets.
	60 Vict. No. 17	30 September 1896
An Act to authorise the substitution of certain Roads and Streets for certain existing Roads and Streets, and for closing certain portions of such existing Roads and Streets.
Constitution Act Amendment Act 1896	60 Vict. No. 18	
Metropolitan Water Works Act 1896	60 Vict. No. 19	
	60 Vict. No. 20	8 October 1896
An Act to apply out of the Consolidated Revenue Fund and from Moneys to Credit of Loan Accounts the sum of Three Hundred and Fifty Thousand Pounds (Note: £350,000 in 1896 is equivalent to A$62,800,000 in 2022.) to the Service of the Year ending 30th June, 1897.
	60 Vict. No. 21	27 October 1896
An Act to apply a sum out of the Consolidated Revenue Fund and from Moneys to Credit of the General Loan Fund to the Services of the Year ending the last day of June, One thousand eight hundred and ninety-seven, and to appropriate the Supplies granted in this Session of Parliament.
Transfer of Land Act 1893 Amendment Act 1896	60 Vict. No. 22	
Perth Park Streets or Roads Closure Act 1896	60 Vict. No. 23	
Judges' Pensions Act 1896	60 Vict. No. 24	
Colonial Passengers Act 1896	60 Vict. No. 25	
Agricultural Lands Purchase Act 1896	60 Vict. No. 26	
Evidence Amendment Act 1896	60 Vict. No. 27	
Loan Act 1896	60 Vict. No. 28	
Loans Consolidation Act 1896	60 Vict. No. 29	
	60 Vict. No. 30	27 October 1896
An Act to facilitate the Administration of Justice, and the taking of Statutory Declarations.
Criminal Evidence Act 1896	60 Vict. No. 31	27 October 1896
An Act to amend the Laws of Evidence.
Australasian Federation Enabling Act 1896	60 Vict. No. 32	27 October 1896
An Act to enable Western Australia to take part in the Framing, Acceptance, and Enactment of a Federal Constitution for Australasia.
Cue–Nannine Railway Act 1896	60 Vict. No. 33	27 October 1896
An Act to authorise the Construction of a Railway from Cue to Nannine.
Railways Amendment Act 1896	60 Vict. No. 34	
Bastardy Laws Act 1875 Amendment Act 1896	60 Vict. No. 35	
Goldfields Act Amendment Act 1896	60 Vict. No. 36	
Kalgoorlie–Kanowna Railway Act 1896	60 Vict. No. 37	27 October 1896
An Act to authorise the Construction of a Railway from Kalgoorlie to Kanowna.
Jury Act Amendment Act 1896	60 Vict. No. 38	
York–Greenhills Railway Act 1896	60 Vict. No. 39	27 October 1896
An Act to authorise the Construction of a Railway from York to Greenhills.
Public Health Act Amendment Act 1896	60 Vict. No. 40	
Perth Racecourse Railway Act 1896	60 Vict. No. 41	27 October 1896
An Act to authorise the Construction of a Railway from Bayswater to Perth Racecourse.
Lands Resumption Act 1896	60 Vict. No. 42	27 October 1896
An Act to amend the Lands Resumption Act, 1894. (Note: Lands Resumption Act 1894 (58 Vict. No. 33))
Great Southern Railway Purchase Act 1896	60 Vict. No. 43	27 October 1896
An Act for the Purchase by the Government of Western Australia of the whole of the Interests of the West Australian Land Company, Limited, in Western Australia, including the Railway from Beverley to Albany, commonly called the Great Southern Railway.
Kalgoorlie–Menzies Railway Act 1896	60 Vict. No. 44	27 October 1896
An Act to authorise the Construction of a Railway from Kalgoorlie to Menzies.

=== Private acts ===
Short title, or popular name	Citation	Royal assent
Long title
Church of England School Lands Act 1896 or the Anglican Church of Australia School Lands Act 1896	60 Vict. Private Act	27 October 1896
An Act to empower the Diocesan Trustees of the Church of England in Western Australia to sell, mortgage, or lease Perth Allotments H 7 and H 1, and to apply the proceeds or rents and profits thereof subject to and in accordance with certain trusts.
Western Australian Bank Act 1896	60 Vict. Private Act	27 October 1896
An Act to repeal and re-enact with amendments the provisions of "An Act to incorporate the Shareholders of the Western Australian Bank and for other purposes." (Note: Western Australian Bank Act 1879 (42 Vict. No. 33))

== Sources ==
- "legislation.wa.gov.au".
