= List of acts of the Parliament of Western Australia from 1904 =

This is a list of acts of the Parliament of Western Australia for the year 1904.

== 1904 ==
=== Public acts ===
Short title, or popular name	Citation	Royal assent
Long title
Early Closing Act Amendment Act 1904	No. 1 of 1904	16 January 1904
An Act to amend the Early Closing Act, 1902. (Note: Early Closing Act 1902 (1 & 2 Edw. VII. No. 24))
Boulder Tramways Act 1904	No. 2 of 1904	16 January 1904
An Act to confirm a Provisional Order authorising the construction of Tramways in the Municipality of Boulder.
	Provisional Order.	
Kalgoorlie Tramways Act Amendment Act 1904	No. 5 of 1904	16 January 1904
An Act to confirm a Further Provisional Order to amend, extend, or vary a Provisional Order and a Further Provisional Order authorising the construction of Tramways in the Municipality of Kalgoorlie.
	Further Provisional Order.	
Collie–Narrogin Railway Act 1904	No. 16 of 1904	16 January 1904
An Act to authorise the Construction of a Railway from Collie to Narrogin.
Jandakot Railway Act 1904	No. 17 of 1904	16 January 1904
An Act to authorise the Construction of a Railway from Woodman's Point to Jandakot.
Government Railways Act 1904	No. 23 of 1904	16 January 1904
An Act to consolidate and amend the Law relating to the Maintenance and Management of Government Railways.
Tramways Amendment Act 1904	No. 30 of 1904	1 November 1904
An Act to amend the Tramways Act, 1885. (Note: Tramways Act 1885 (49 Vict. No. 23))
City of Perth Tramways Amendment Act 1904	No. 43 of 1904	24 December 1904
An Act to confirm a Further Provisional Order to amend, extend, and vary certain Provisional Orders authorising the Construction of Tramways in the City of Perth.
	Perth Electric Tramways, Limited. Further Provisional Order.	
North Perth Tramways Act 1904	No. 45 of 1904	24 December 1904
An Act to confirm a Provisional Order authorising; the Construction of Tramways in the Municipality of North Perth.
	In the matter of "The Tramways Act, 1885," and in the matter of an application by "The Perth Electric Tramways, Limited," for a Provisional Order authorising the construction of Tramways in the District of the Municipality of North Perth.	
Victoria Park Tramways Act 1904	No. 50 of 1904	24 December 1904
An Act to confirm a Provisional Order authorising the Construction of Tramways in the Municipality of Victoria Park.
	Provisional Order.	
	No. X of 1904	
Brands Act 1904	No. 61 of 1904	24 December 1904
An Act to amend the Law relating to the Registration of Brands on Stock.

=== Private acts ===
Short title, or popular name	Citation	Royal assent
Long title
Katanning Electric Lighting and Power (Private) Act 1904	Private Act of 1904	16 January 1904
An Act to authorise Frederick Henry Piesse, and his assigns, to manufacture, generate, distribute, sell, and supply Electric Light, Power, and Heat in the Townsite of Katanning, and to construct all necessary Works in connection therewith.
Land Act Amendment Act 1904 (Private Act)	Private Act of 1904	16 January 1904
An Act to amend an Act intituled the Land Act, 1898, Amendment Act (Private), 1899. (Note: Land Act 1898 Amendment Act (Private) 1899 (63 Vict.))
Kalgoorlie Racecourse Tramways Act 1904 (repealed)	Private Act of 1904	24 December 1904
An Act to authorise The Kalgoorlie Electric Tramways, Limited, to construct, maintain, and manage a line of Tramways on the Racecourse at Kalgoorlie. (Repealed by Statutes (Repeals and Minor Amendments) Act (No. 2) 1998 (No. 10))
Kalgoorlie and Boulder Racing Clubs Act 1904 (repealed)	Private Act of 1904	24 December 1904
An Act to enable the Members of "The Kalgoorlie Racing Club" and of "The Boulder Racing Club" to sue and be sued in the name of the Chairman for the time being of each of such Clubs and for other purposes. (Repealed by Racing, Wagering and Betting Legislation Amendment and Repeal Act 2007 (No. 8))

== Sources ==
- "legislation.wa.gov.au".
