= List of acts of the Parliament of Western Australia from 1948 =

This is a list of acts of the Parliament of Western Australia for the year 1948.

== 1948 ==
=== Public acts ===
Short title, or popular name	Citation	Royal assent
Long title
	No. 1 of 1948	13 August 1948
An Act to apply out of the Consolidated Revenue Fund the sum of Three Million Pounds and from Moneys to Credit of the General Loan Fund Five Hundred Thousand Pounds, to the Service of the Year ending 30th June, 1949, and to apply out of the Public Account the sum of Three Hundred Thousand Pounds for the purpose of temporary Advances to be made by the Treasurer.
Increase of Rent (War Restrictions) Act Amendment Act 1948	No. 2 of 1948	13 August 1948
An Act to amend and continue the operation of the Increase of Rent (War Restrictions) Act, 1939-1947. (Note: Increase of Rent (War Restrictions) Act 1939 (No. 45))
Railway (Brown Hill Loop Kalgoorlie–Gnumballa Lake) Discontinuance Act 1948	No. 11 of 1948	11 November 1948
An Act to authorise the discontinuance of the operation of the Loop Line of Railway from the Hannan's Street Station, Kalgoorlie–Gnurnballa Lake Railway, to the Kamballie Station, on the same Railway, and for other purposes.
Foundation Day Observance (1949 Royal Visit) Act 1948	No. 30 of 1948	9 December 1948
An Act relating to the observance of a holiday on Foundation Day during the year of the proposed Royal Visit, namely one thousand nine hundred and forty-nine.
Railway (Mt. Magnet–Black Range) Discontinuance Act 1948	No. 67 of 1948	21 January 1949
An Act to authorise the Discontinuance of the Operation of the Railway from Mt. Magnet to Black Range, and for other purposes.
	No. X of 1948	
Appropriation Act 1948-49	No. 86 of 1948	26 January 1949
An Act to appropriate and apply out of the Consolidated Revenue Fund and from Moneys to Credit of the General Loan Fund and from the Public Account certain sums to make good the supplies granted for the service of the Year ending the thirtieth day of June, One thousand nine hundred and forty-nine, and to supplement grants made by the present Parliament during its last Session in adjustment of the Vote "Advance to Treasurer, 1947-48" for charges during the Year ended the 30th day of June, 1948; and to approve of certain expenditure under section forty-one of the Forests Act, 1918-1931. (Note: Forests Act 1918 (No. 8 of 1919))

=== Public acts ===
Short title, or popular name	Citation	Royal assent
Long title
West Australian Club Act 1948		9 December 1948
An Act to resolve certain difficulties concerning the legal position of The West Australian Club, a Company duly registered under the Companies Act, 1893, (Note: Companies Act 1893 (56 Vict. No. 8)) and to vest the assets of the Company in an Association to be formed and registered under the Associations Incorporation Act, 1895-1947, (Note: Associations Incorporation Act 1895 (59 Vict. No. 20)) and for other purposes arising out of such difficulties and incidental to such vesting.

== Sources ==
- "legislation.wa.gov.au".
