= WAGR V class =

Class of Australian 2-8-2 locomotives

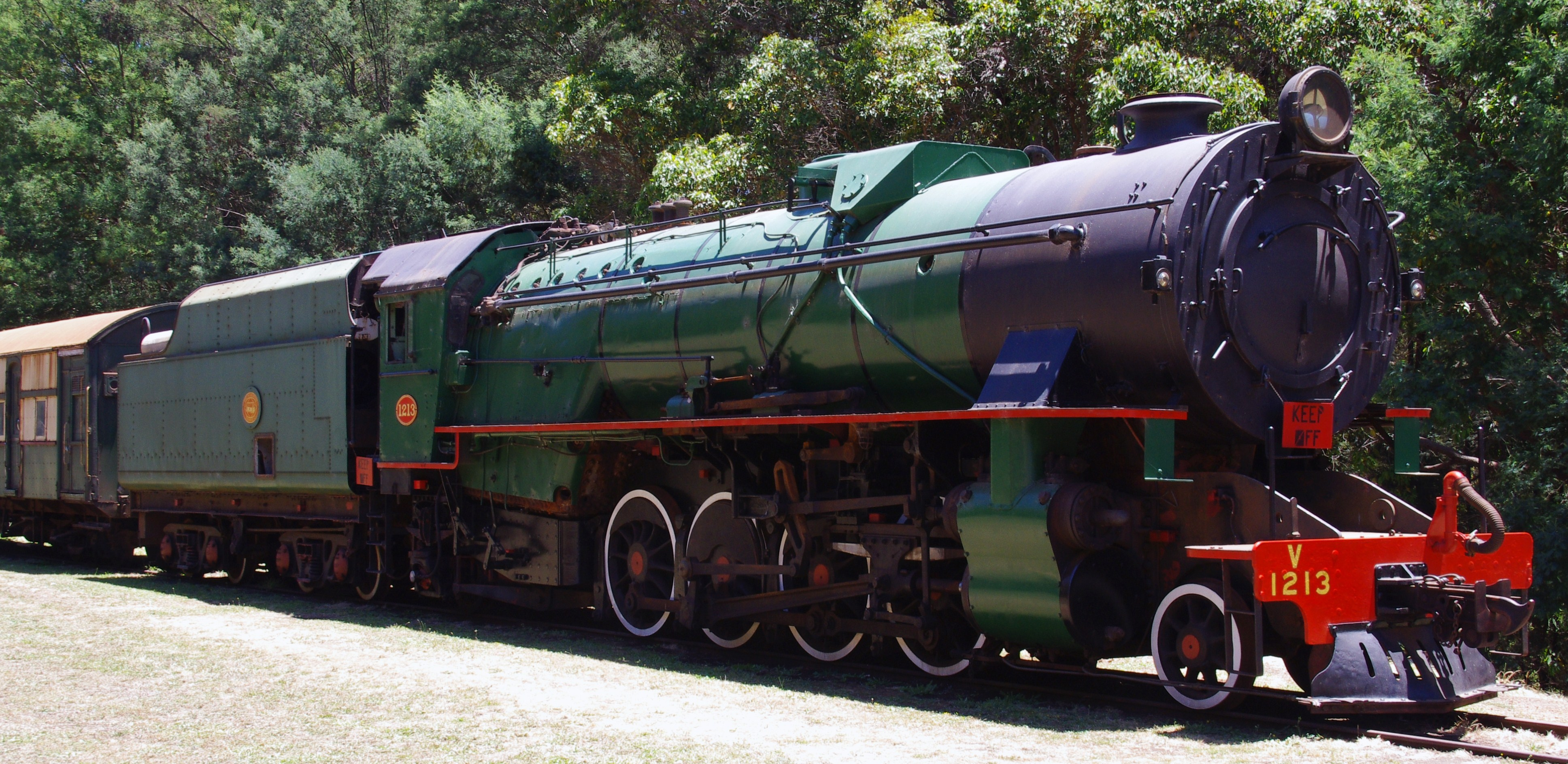
- V1213 at Pemberton station in December 2011
Type and origin
- Power type: Steam
- Builder: Robert Stephenson and Hawthorns as subcontractor to Beyer, Peacock & Co
- Serial number: Beyer, Peacock & Co 7726–7749
- Build date: 1955
- Total produced: 24
Specifications
- Configuration
  - Whyte: 2-8-2
  - UIC: 1′D1′ h2
- Gauge: 3 ft 6 in (1,067 mm)
- Leading dia.: 21.5 in (55 cm)
- Driver dia.: 51 in (130 cm)
- Trailing dia.: 21.5 in (55 cm)
- Wheelbase: 32 ft 9 in (9.98 m)
- Length: 69 ft 8 in (21.23 m)
- Width: 9 ft 6 in (2.90 m)
- Height: 12 ft 8 in (3.86 m)
- Axle load: 14 long tons 5 cwt (31,900 lb or 14.5 t)
- Adhesive weight: 14 long tons 5 cwt (31,900 lb or 14.5 t)
- Loco weight: 80 long tons 14 cwt 2 q
- Total weight: 134 long tons 18 cwt 2 q
- Fuel type: Coal
- Fuel capacity: 7 long tons 0 cwt (15,700 lb or 7.1 t)
- Water cap.: 5,390 imp gal (24,500 L; 6,470 US gal)
- Firebox
  - Grate area: 40 sq ft (3.7 m^{2})
- Boiler pressure: 215 lbf/in^{2} (1.48 MPa)
- Heating surface
  - Firebox: 247 sq ft (22.9 m^{2})
  - Tubes: 1,570 sq ft (146 m^{2})
  - Total surface: 1,817 sq ft (168.8 m^{2})
- Superheater
  - Heating area: 492 sq ft (45.7 m^{2})
- Cylinders: Two
- Cylinder size: 19 in × 26 in (483 mm × 660 mm)
- Valve gear: Walschaerts
Performance figures
- Tractive effort: 33,633 lbf (149.61 kN)
- Factor of adh.: 3.8
Career
- Operators: Western Australian Government Railways
- Numbers: V1201–V1224
- Delivered: 1955–1956
- First run: 12 April 1955
- Withdrawn: 14 August 1972
- Preserved: V1209, V1213, V1215, V1220
- Disposition: 4 preserved, 20 scrapped

The WAGR V class was the last class of steam locomotive to enter service with the Western Australian Government Railways (WAGR). The class was part of the post war regeneration plan for the WAGR, intended for the heavy coal traffic between the Collie coal fields and Perth.

== Engineering background ==
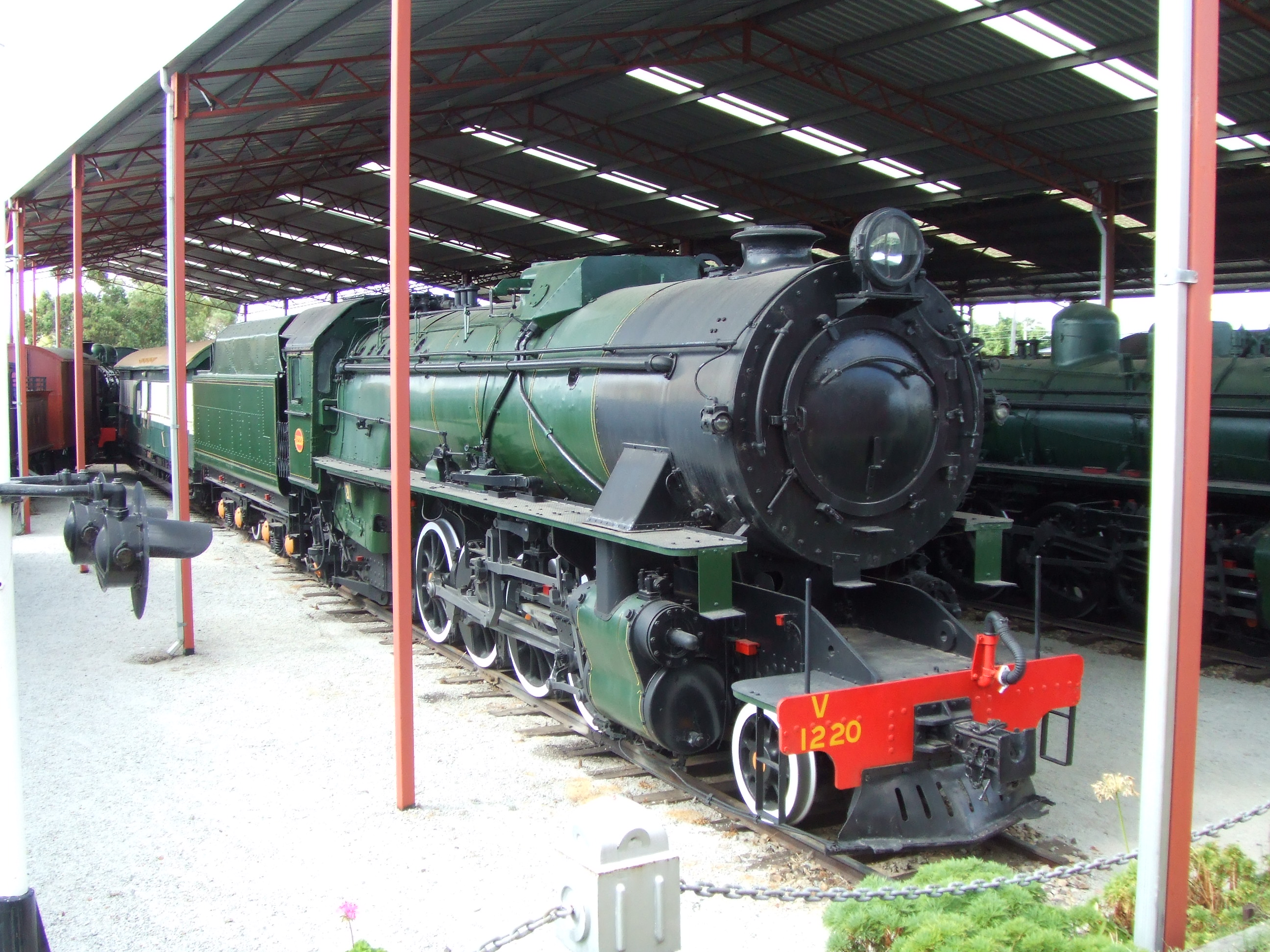
V1220 at the Western Australian Rail Transport Museum in April 2006

Twenty-four locomotives were ordered in 1951 from Beyer, Peacock and Company, Manchester. Capacity issues saw construction of the locomotives subcontracted to Robert Stephenson & Hawthorn's Darlington works although still issued with Beyer Peacock builders numbers. The locomotives entered service between April 1955 and November 1956.

The locomotive was of a modern design with a high superheat, a large combustion chamber and a thermic syphon in the firebox. Roller bearings were used on all the locomotive and tender wheels. When introduced the V class was the largest rigid wheelbase locomotive on the WAGR system, exceeded only by the Australian Standard Garratt. The class was designed to have as many parts as possible interchangeable with the W class.

== Operational history ==
The rated load capacity was 1,320 tons between Brunswick Junction and Armadale, compared to 1,135 tons for the S class and 850 tons for the Fs class. By all accounts the V class were a reliable and free-steaming locomotive. The V class locomotives entered service in 1955 and initially worked heavy coal trains from the Collie area. Later they were used on equally heavy freight trains, particularly over the Great Southern line from York to Albany. Most were condemned in June 1971, with the remainder following in August 1972. On 25 June 1972. V1220 hauled the final WAGR steam hauled service, the Farewell to Steam special from Brunswick Junction to Collie.

== Preservation ==
Four of the class have survived. Three are owned by preservation societies, whilst the fourth, V1213, is owned by the private rail operator Pemberton Tramway Company who provided Driver Experience courses, in addition to hauling some timber on its railway. The haulage of timber ceased in 2005.

Various records suggest that the V Class were considered for preservation by the South Australian Steamtown Peterborough Railway Preservation Society.

== Class list ==
The numbers and periods in service of each member of the V class were as follows:

Builder's number	Works number	Road number	In service	Withdrawn	Notes
7770	7726	1201	12 April 1955	17 June 1971	
7771	7727	1202	10 May 1955	17 June 1971	
7772	7728	1203	9 June 1955	17 June 1971	Fitted with Nathan DV3 mechanical lubricator, March 1968
7773	7729	1204	24 June 1955	17 June 1971	Fitted with Nathan DV3 mechanical lubricator, May 1968
7774	7730	1205	8 July 1955	17 June 1971	
7775	7732	1206	15 July 1955	17 June 1971	Damaged in collision at Mundijong, 20 April 1969; repaired by 9 July 1969
7776	7733	1207	27 July 1955	17 June 1971	
7777	7734	1208	10 October 1955	14 August 1972	
7778	7735	1209	4 October 1955	17 June 1971	Preserved at Bellarine Railway, Victoria. Recommissioned 1991, named Spirit of Alcoa and used for occasional passenger services, currently stored
7779	7731	1210	19 October 1955	17 June 1971	
7780	7736	1211	2 November 1955	17 June 1971	
7781	7737	1212	1 December 1955	17 June 1971	
7782	7738	1213	20 December 1955	17 June 1971	To Hotham Valley Railway (HVR) 8 April 1981, sold to Willis Engineering. Recommissioned on a narrow gauge freight, 27 May 1992 and used for occasional passenger services for both Pemberton Tramway Company and HVR.
7783	7739	1214	23 December 1955	17 June 1971	
7784	7740	1215	13 February 1956	17 June 1971	Preserved at Collie
7785	7741	1216	20 February 1956	17 June 1971	
7786	7742	1217	14 June 1956	17 June 1971	Standard Detroit lubricator fitted, early 1967 to 5 March 1968
7787	7743	1218	28 March 1956	14 August 1972	
7788	7744	1219	13 April 1956	14 August 1972	
7789	7745	1220	25 June 1956	14 August 1972	Preserved at Western Australian Rail Transport Museum
7790	7746	1221	13 July 1956	17 June 1971	
7791	7747	1222	2 August 1956	17 June 1971	
7792	7748	1223	5 October 1956	17 June 1971	Standard Detroit lubricator fitted, 1967–1968
7793	7749	1224	16 November 1956	17 June 1971	

== See also ==
- Rail transport in Western Australia
- List of Western Australian locomotive classes
