= WAGR G class =

Class of steam locomotives operated by WAGR

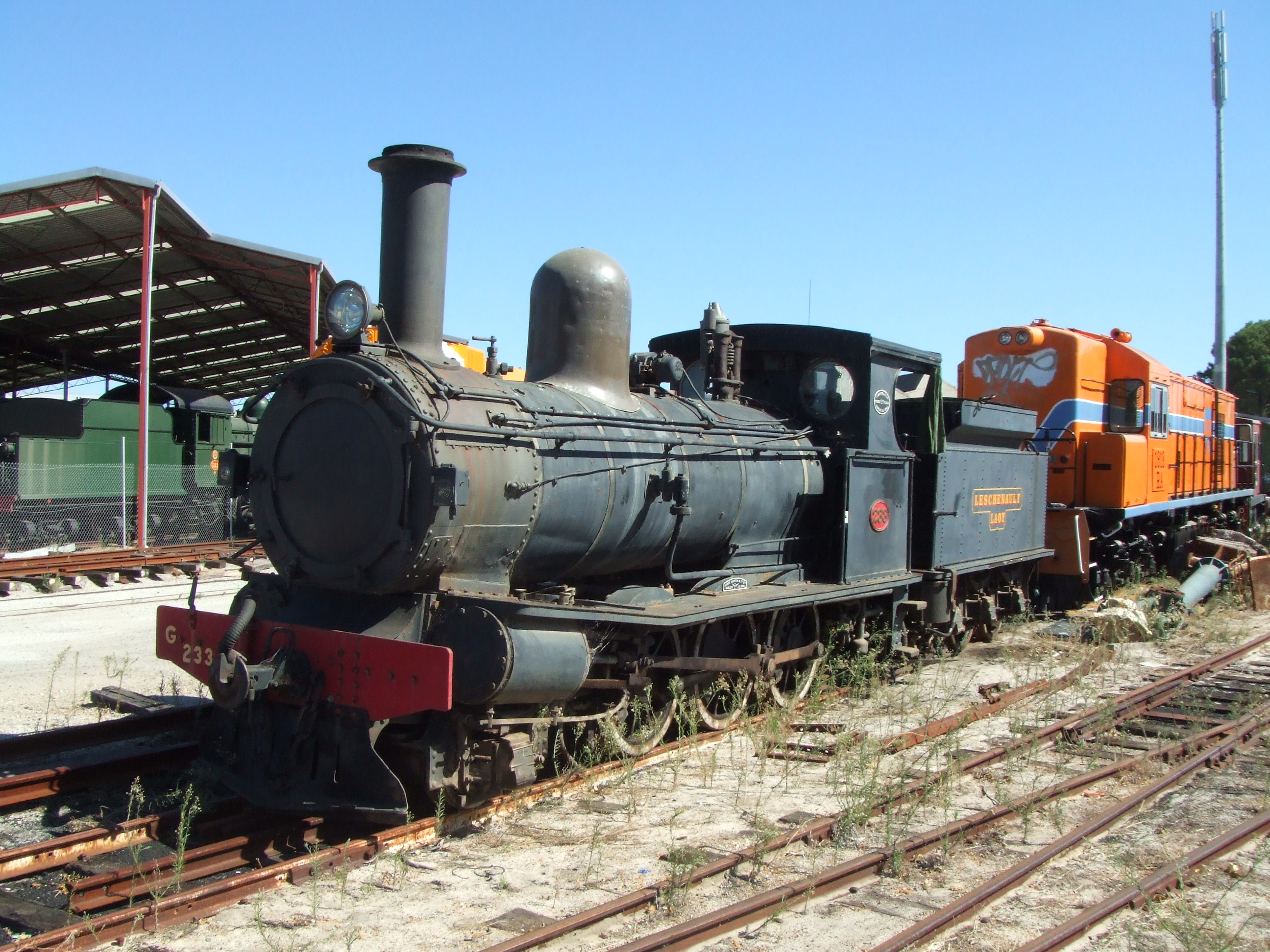
- G233 Leschenault Lady at the Railway Museum, Bassendean
Type and origin
- Power type: Steam
- Designer: Beyer, Peacock & Co; Dübs & Co.
- Builder: Beyer, Peacock & Co; James Martin & Co; Neilson & Co; Dübs & Co.
- Total produced: 72
Specifications
- Configuration
  - Whyte: 2-6-0 (48) and 4-6-0 (24)
- Gauge: 3 ft 6 in (1,067 mm) (note the below figures varied within the class)
- Driver dia.: 3 ft 3 in (991 mm)
- Length: 2-6-0: 39 ft 0 in (11.89 m); 4-6-0: 40 ft 6 in (12.34 m)
- Width: 6 ft 11.8 in (2.13 m)
- Height: 11 ft 5.8 in (3.50 m)
- Total weight: 2-6-0: 42 long tons 2 cwt (94,300 lb or 42.8 t); 4-6-0: 43 long tons 0 cwt (96,300 lb or 43.7 t)
- Fuel type: Coal
- Water cap.: 1,600 imp gal (7,300 L; 1,900 US gal)
- Boiler pressure: 2-6-0: 160 lbf/in^{2} (1.10 MPa); 4-6-0: 135 lbf/in^{2} (0.93 MPa)
- Cylinder size: 14.5 in × 20 in (368 mm × 508 mm)
Performance figures
- Tractive effort: 2-6-0: 13,801 lbf (61.39 kN); 4-6-0: 11,321 lbf (50.36 kN)
Career
- Operators: Western Australian Government Railways
- First run: 1889
- Retired: 1972
- Preserved: G53, G117, G118, G123, G233
- Disposition: 5 preserved, 67 scrapped

The WAGR G class is a class of steam locomotives operated by the Western Australian Government Railways (WAGR) from 1889. The class's wheel arrangement varied; 48 were 2-6-0s and 24 were 4-6-0s.

== History ==
A total of 72 G class engines were acquired by the WAGR between 1889 and 1899, both new and second-hand. They were the first class of locomotives to be introduced to the WAGR network in quantity. They were part of what became almost an Australian 3 ft 6 in (1,067 mm) standard, as locomotives of similar design served in large numbers as the Silverton Tramway Y class, South Australian Railways Y class and Tasmanian Government Railways C class, and also on the Chillagoe Railway & Mining Co in Queensland, the Emu Bay Railway in Tasmania and the North Australia Railway in the Northern Territory.

They were originally designed by Beyer, Peacock & Co who built nine, with James Martin & Co building 29, Neilson & Co 12 and Dübs and Co 22.

During World War II, 13 were sold to the Commonwealth Railways for use on the North Australia Railway which became their NGA and NFC classes. Three were also sold to the Chillagoe Railway & Mining Co in 1907, while others were sold for further use by timber mill operators in Western Australia, such as Millars, Bunnings Bros, Kauri Timber Co., Goldfields Firewood Supply and the State Saw Mills. The class remained in service in significant numbers until the 1960s. Millars No. 71 "Menzies" (ex-WAGR G 111) was the last G Class withdrawn in 1972, having the mantle of the last steam locomotive in revenue service in Western Australia.

== Survivors ==
Several have been preserved:

- G53: plinthed at Pemberton and displaying its State Saw Mills identity, SSM No.7
- G117: on display at Merredin station
- G118: on display at Kalamunda station
- G123: Koombana Queen preserved by the Hotham Valley Railway
- G233: Leschenault Lady restored to operational condition by Rail Heritage WA in Boyanup

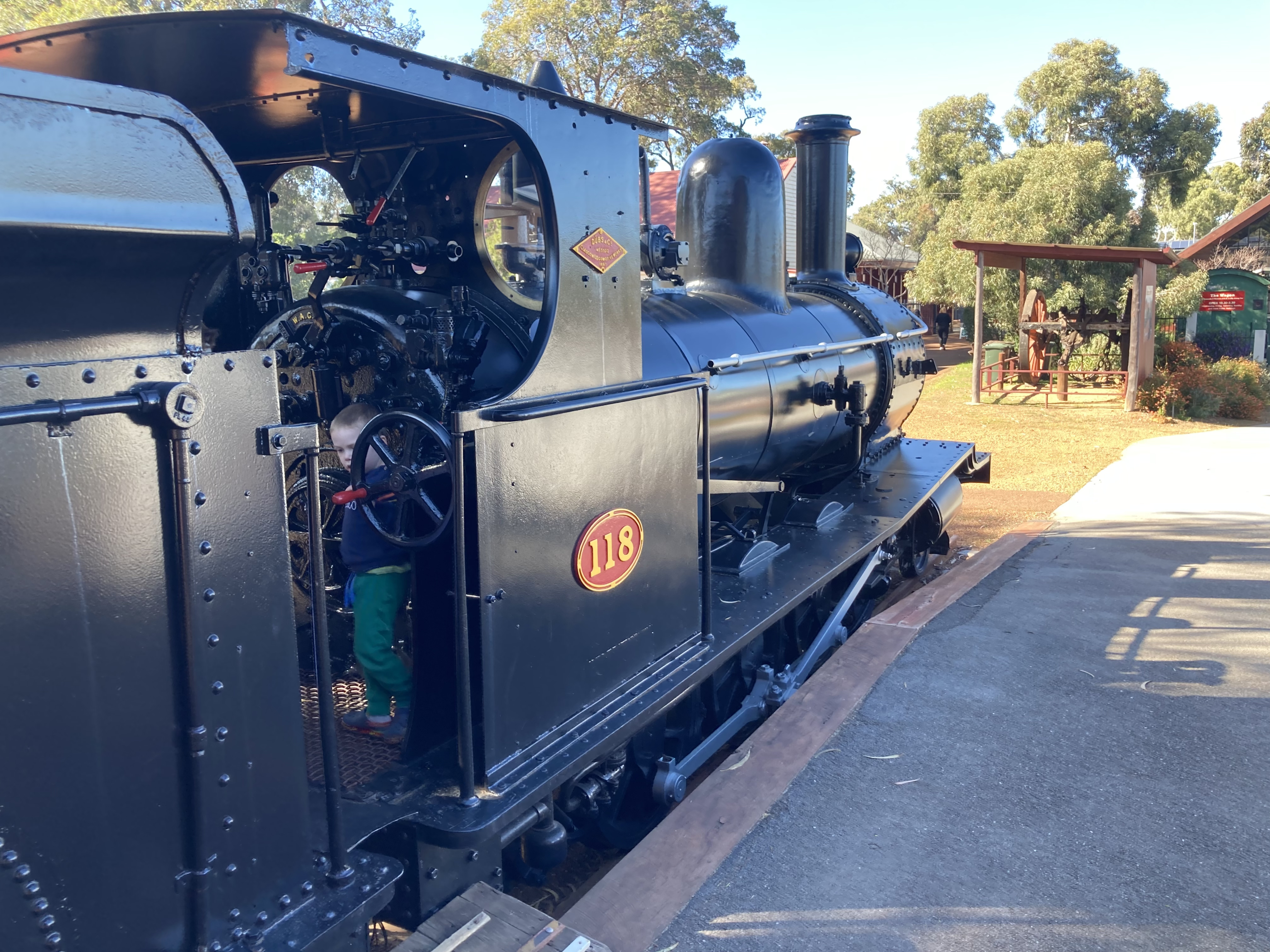
G 118 in Kalamunda

== See also ==
- History of rail transport in Western Australia
- List of Western Australian locomotive classes
