= WAGR P and Pr classes =

Class of Australian 4-6-2 locomotives

WAGR P class
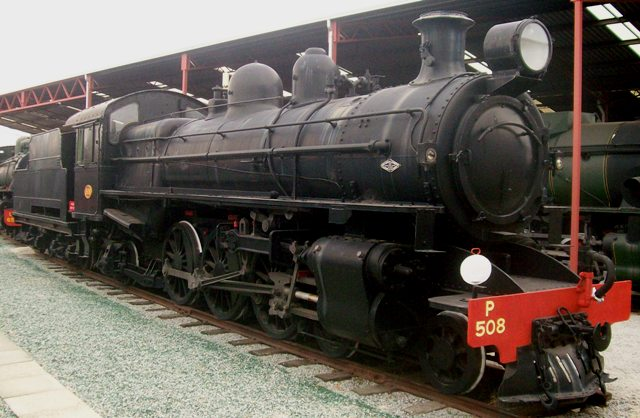
- P508 at the Western Australian Rail Transport Museum
Type and origin
- Power type: Steam
- Designer: E.S. Race
- Builder: North British Locomotive Company & Midland Railway Workshops
- Build date: 1924-1929
- Total produced: 25
- Rebuilder: Midland Railway Workshops
- Rebuild date: 1941-1944
- Number rebuilt: 8 as Pr class
Specifications
- Configuration
  - Whyte: 4-6-2
- Gauge: 3 ft 6 in (1,067 mm)
- Driver dia.: 4 ft 0 in (1,219 mm)
- Length: 62 ft 2 in (18.95 m)
- Total weight: 102 long tons 5 cwt (229,000 lb or 103.9 t)
- Fuel type: Coal
- Fuel capacity: 7 long tons 0 cwt (15,700 lb or 7.1 t)/ 8 long tons 0 cwt (17,900 lb or 8.1 t)
- Water cap.: 2,440 imp gal (11,100 L; 2,930 US gal)/ 2,800 imp gal (13,000 L; 3,400 US gal)
- Firebox
  - Grate area: 35 sq ft (3.3 m^{2})
- Boiler pressure: 160 lbf/in^{2} (1,100 kPa)
Performance figures
- Tractive effort: 23,638 lbf (105.15 kN)
- Factor of adh.: 3.6
Career
- Operators: Western Australian Government Railways
- Numbers: P441-P465 (as delivered), renumbered P501-P517 in 1947
- Last run: 1969
- Preserved: P508
- Disposition: 1 preserved, 24 scrapped

The WAGR P and Pr classes were two classes of 4-6-2 steam locomotives designed for express passenger service on the Western Australian Government Railways mainline network. The initial designs were prepared by E.S. Race and together the two classes had a total build number of thirty-five locomotives, the P and Pr classes entering service in 1924 and 1938 respectively. Both classes were used on express passenger services, greatly improving the economy and speed of long-distance passenger travel in Western Australia, the results of which were most visible on the Western Australian stage of the Trans-Australian Railway and Westland Express.

The need for more powerful locomotives in the 1920s resulted in the introduction of twenty-five P class locomotives which provided a significant improvement in power, speed and economy over previous WAGR locomotives, quickly proving to be a highly successful design. The Great Depression of the 1930s, coupled with the effects of the Great War, thwarted the WAGR's later expansion and acquisition plans resulting in many obsolete locomotives remaining in operation into this period. As a result ten new P class locomotives featuring detail improvements to boilers, valves and bogies were introduced in 1938, a year before the outbreak of World War II. The new locomotives became the first WAGR engines to be given names, each bearing that of a prominent Western Australian river. These 'River class' locomotives were very successful and proved so invaluable to the operation of the wartime WAGR that eight P class locomotives were modified to their standard. All eighteen locomotives were officially classified as the Pr class in 1946.

The initial ten P class locomotives were built by the North British Locomotive Company in Glasgow while the remainder, including the ten Pr class locomotives, were built locally by the Midland Railway Workshops.

== Background ==
By the early 1920s, the WAGR had obtained only a handful of new locomotive designs since the beginning of the twentieth century and there was a particular lack of large passenger locomotives. The Annual Report of 1920 pointed out the large numbers of obsolete locomotives in service and steadily growing rail traffic, stressing the need for more powerful engines. The most substantial design then in service was the E class 4-6-2s of 1902, of which 65 locomotives had been built for operation in Western Australia and served on a variety of services. Likewise the 20 D class 4-6-4T tank locomotives had helped alleviate pressure on suburban services while the 57 F class 4-8-0s did the same for goods. However, all had been introduced (and subsequently superheated) prior to the First World War, meaning that by the 1920s, they were becoming inadequate. At this time, the most significant operation requiring new locomotives were the long distance passenger services, particularly on the Perth to Kalgoorlie and Perth to Albany expresses, both of which covered distances in excess of 350 kilometres.

In 1923, approval was given for the construction of ten new superheated Pacific type locomotives for operation on heavier mainline rails, suitable for the hauling of the expresses. The locomotives were based on plans drawn up in 1920 under Chief Mechanical Engineer of the WAGR Ernest A. Evans which called for a new design with large diameter driving wheels, a large firebox and a two-wheel trailing wheel for stable operation at speed. The final outline drawings were prepared by E.S. Race in the Midland Railway Workshops and completed in December 1923. Influence for the new P class designs were drawn from both the New Zealand Railways A^{B} and the Tasmanian Government Railways R class.

== Details of design ==
While initial plans called for a round-top firebox (such as featured on the New Zealand A^{B} class), the P class was eventually designed and delivered with Belpaire fireboxes, which improve steam production over the more traditional round-top types, but are harder to fit. The P class locomotives featured a wide firebox located behind the coupled wheels and supported by a trailing-wheel. The large firebox aided with the use of poor-grade local coal from the Collie coalfields. This low quality coal had frequently resulted in poor steaming in earlier locomotives, but the P class design largely avoided this problem, resulting in a locomotive 30% more economical than the earlier F class engines of similar tractive effort. The P and Pr class also featured innovations to alter the weight-distribution between the driving and trailing wheels, improving adhesive traction.

Two types of tender were used by the P and Pr class locomotives. The original tender (as designed) had a water capacity of 2,800 imperial gallons and a coal capacity of 8 tons. These were built with the initial builds of the 10 P and 10 Pr class locomotives. The remaining 15 P class locomotives (all locally constructed) were fitted with modified R Class tenders which were shorter, and had been upgraded to have a water capacity of 2,440 gallons and 7 tons of coal. These short tenders were distinctive and referred to as the 'bob-tailed' tenders.

== Construction history ==
It was the North British Locomotive Company of Glasgow, Scotland which secured the order for the P class locomotives in 1924, ahead of several other companies including Thompson & Co of Victoria. North British was to supply ten locomotives with delivery inside of 33-weeks, which would be in time for the 1924/1925 wheat harvest when the introduction of the P class locomotives would free up other locomotives for use on wheat trains. Accordingly, six locomotives entered traffic in December 1924, followed by an additional four in February 1925.

The next batch of ten P class locomotives were constructed locally in Western Australia in 1927, at the Midland Railway Workshops. They were identical to the North British locomotives excepting the short tenders rebuilt from those of the obsolete R class engines. This order was extended by an additional five locomotives which were delivered in 1929, bringing the total to twenty-five locomotives. Several exchanges of tenders occurred throughout the service life of the P and Pr class locomotives, such as exchanging the long tender of an unconverted P class locomotive for the short tender of a later Pr class engine.

The P class locomotives were given the numbers P441-P465 in order of delivery, with P451-P465 being delivered with short tenders.

=== Pr class modifications ===
WAGR Pr class
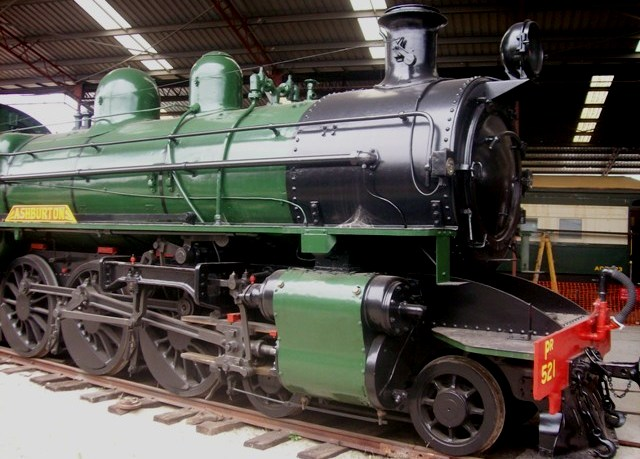
- PR521 at the Western Australian Rail Transport Museum, note the running-board nameplate and hemispherical headlight in contrast to the cylindrical example on P508 above
Type and origin
- Power type: Steam
- Designer: E.S. Race
- Builder: Midland Railway Workshops
- Build date: 1938-1944
- Total produced: 18 including 8 converted from P class
Specifications
- Configuration
  - Whyte: 4-6-2
- Gauge: 3 ft 6 in (1,067 mm)
- Driver dia.: 4 ft 6 in (1,372 mm)
- Length: 62 ft 4 in (19.00 m)
- Total weight: 102 long tons 10 cwt (229,600 lb or 104.1 t)
- Fuel type: Coal
- Fuel capacity: 8 long tons 0 cwt (17,900 lb or 8.1 t) /8 long tons 0 cwt (17,900 lb or 8.1 t)
- Water cap.: 2,800 imp gal (13,000 L; 3,400 US gal)
- Firebox
  - Grate area: 35 sq ft (3.3 m^{2})
- Boiler pressure: 175 lbf/in^{2} (1,210 kPa)
- Cylinder size: 19 in × 26 in (483 mm × 660 mm)
Performance figures
- Tractive effort: 25,855 lbf (115.01 kN)
- Factor of adh.: 3.6
Career
- Operators: Western Australian Government Railways
- Numbers: Pr138-Pr147 (new builds); Pr453-Pr457, Pr459, Pr461, Pr464 (rebuilds) renumbered P521-P538 in 1946
- Nicknames: River class
- Last run: 1970
- Preserved: Pr521
- Disposition: 1 preserved, 17 scrapped

By the late 1930s, with even more engines requiring urgent maintenance and repairs, orders were placed for an additional ten P class locomotives which would be improved through modifications to the boilers, bogies, headlights and valve gear. These new locomotives were constructed at the Midland Railway Workshops. The boilers featured an increase in pressure from 160 to 175psi, which provided more power, and the bogies were constructed in cast steel. These improved locomotives were delivered to the same operating specifications as the original P class, with the same weight distribution and boiler pressure limited to 160 psi, though improvements to the track and bridges on the Eastern Goldfields Railway in 1940 meant that they could be altered to use their designed power through the increasing of the axle load from 12.8 to 14.2 tons and the resetting of the boiler-top safety valves to 175 psi. The result was a 9% increase in tractive effort with the same economical running of the P class.

The Pr class were numbered Pr138 to Pr147 and were further distinguished from other classes by the placement of running-board nameplates; each locomotive bearing the name of a prominent Western Australian river, such as Ashburton, Avon and Chapman. For this reason the class was initially known as the River class. They were the first WAGR locomotives to be given names.

The Pr class proved such a success that it was decided to convert eight of the locally-constructed P class locomotives to Pr standard. Numbers 453-457, 459, 461 and 464 were rebuilt in this way and the naming practice was continued. These conversions retained their short tenders, and were completed between June 1941 and June 1944, when the demands of wartime traffic required more powerful locomotives.

Following the war ten of the class were converted to oil burners in 1947 and again in 1949 due to industrial trouble on the Collie coalfields, where the WAGR obtained its coal fuel. These conversions were temporary, lasting only as long as the lack of fuel prevailed. In later years the boilers were modified to be interchangeable with the Pm and Pmr class locomotives, which were introduced in 1949.

== Service history ==
The P class locomotives proved to be an excellent design, being free steaming and easy to operate. They quickly reduced the need for bank engines which were normally need to provide extra power up the steep gradients across the Darling Scarp. In addition to saving time and resources, this freed up additional badly needed locomotives. Better economy also allowed for higher running distances without stops for resupply and higher speeds made for more efficient running of the expresses on which the P class served, primarily on the Great Southern and Eastern Goldfields railways to Albany and Kalgoorlie respectively. Experiments into engine pooling with the P class on the Great Southern Railway in 1932 led to the adoption of this practice across the system, freeing up further locomotives for other duties.

The introduction of the Pr class revolutionised passenger travel, and as part of a national commitment to shaving a day off the transcontinental express the WAGR introduced The Westland in 1938. The use of Pr class locomotives helped to reduce travel times across the West Australian stage of the journey by more than two hours, accompanied by an increase in the permissible load of 300 tons by additional 20.

During the 1940s, both P and Pr class locomotives were used extensively on troop trains, while civilian patronage also increased during this time. The increased war traffic was so great that it necessitated the conversion of eight P class locomotives to Pr standard at a time when lack of available resources and labour had stalled the production of new locomotives, such as the S class until 1943. Both during and following the war the Pr class remained the premier express locomotive, while the P class continued on secondary passenger services, concentrated in the states' South West around Albany, particularly on the Great Southern Railway.

The introduction in 1949 of thirty-five Pm and Pmr class was originally intended to oust the Pr locomotives from express services the later designs proved unstable at speed and were transferred instead to fast goods workings, leaving the Pr class as the only express locomotive on the WAGR. The introduction of X class diesels in 1954, however, ended their long tenure in this position and both P and Pr class locomotives were gradually relegated to goods and shunting duties. Their adequate tractive effort and economy, however, ensured their survival until the very end of steam.

The P class were withdrawn between January 1968 and October 1969. With the exception of Pr528 Murray, which was destroyed by a fire while on-shed at Kalgoorlie in 1950 following an oil leak while operating as an oil-burner, the Pr class were withdrawn from September 1967 with class leader Pr521 Ashburton the last to be withdrawn on 10 September 1970.

== Livery and numbering ==
When introduced the P class locomotives were painted in overall black with red buffer beams, in keeping with WAGR livery policies of the time. The Pr class wore both the overall black livery and a paint scheme with black smoke boxes, tenders and cabs with grey boilers lined in black. The W class of 1951 introduced the larch green with black smoke boxes and red buffer beams livery to Western Australia and this was applied to the majority of tender locomotives, including the P and Pr classes.

The twenty-five P class locomotives originally bore the numbers P441 to P465, but the surviving class members were renumbered P501 to P517 in 1947. The initial batch of 10 Pr class engines were numbered Pr138 to Pr147, while the eight later conversion retained their P class numbers. The Pr class designation was only adopted officially on locomotive registers in 1946, and accordingly saw the class renumbered Pr521 to Pr538.

== Preservation ==
P508 and Pr521 were donated to the Australian Railway Historical Society museum in October 1971 and are on display at the Western Australian Rail Transport Museum.

== Class lists ==
=== P class lists ===
The numbers and periods in service of each member of the P class were as follows:

First batch, built by North British Locomotive Company in 1924:
Builder's number	First number	Second number	In service	Renumbered	Withdrawn	Notes
23143	441	501	13 December 1924	13 June 1947	19 April 1968	
23144	442	502	13 December 1924	13 December 1946	18 January 1968	Stowed 26 June 1964
23145	443	503	27 December 1924	2 May 1947	6 October 1969	
23146	444	504	27 December 1924	4 July 1947	22 July 1969	Stowed 22 November 1962
23147	445	505	27 December 1924	27 August 1947	29 February 1968	
23148	446	506	27 December 1924	27 August 1947	19 April 1968	Stowed 13 March 1963
23149	447	507	14 February 1925	12 June 1947	10 February 1969	Stowed 14 July 1967
23150	448	508	21 February 1925	5 June 1947	10 February 1969	Preserved at Western Australian Rail Transport Museum
23151	449	509	21 February 1925	20 December 1946	6 October 1969	Stowed 31 July 1964
23152	450	510	14 February 1925	17 July 1947	10 February 1969	Stowed 5 July 1965

Second batch, built by Midland Railway Workshops:
First number	Second number	In service	Renumbered	Withdrawn	Notes
451	511	28 February 1927	28 March 1947	6 October 1969	Stowed 29 May 1964
452	512	18 March 1927	12 June 1947	19 April 1968	
453		8 April 1927		5 March 1941	Converted to Pr
454		7 May 1927		29 April 1942	Converted to Pr
455		28 May 1927		29 August 1941	Converted to Pr
456		25 June 1927		28 August 1942	Hauled Royal Train 1 October 1934; converted to Pr
457		23 July 1927		28 May 1941	Converted to Pr
458	513	20 August 1927	27 August 1947	6 October 1969	Stowed 5 March 1964
459		10 September 1927		1 October 1941	Converted to Pr
460	514	1 October 1927	27 October 1947	22 July 1969	
461		19 January 1929		20 April 1944	Converted to Pr
462	515	16 February 1929	11 July 1947	22 July 1969	
463	516	16 March 1929	17 July 1947	22 July 1969	Stowed 7 February 1966
464		20 April 1929		23 March 1944	Converted to Pr
465	517	25 May 1929	5 August 1947	6 October 1969	

=== Pr class list ===
The numbers, names and periods in service of each member of the Pr class were as follows:

First number	Second number	Name	In service	Renumbered	Withdrawn	Notes
138	521	Ashburton	28 January 1938	17 May 1946	10 September 1970	Oil fired 19 December 1947 to 4 October 1948; preserved by Western Australian Rail Transport Museum
139	522	Avon	14 April 1938	20 September 1946	29 February 1968	Oil fired 5 March 1948 to 12 August 1948
140	523	Blackwood	23 June 1938	23 November 1945	22 July 1969	Stowed 25 July 1967
141	524	Fitzroy	29 August 1938	18 October 1946	11 September 1967	Oil fired 17 December 1947 to November 1948 and July 1949 to September 1949; stowed 3 August 1967
142	525	Frankland	20 October 1938	October 1946	11 September 1967	Oil fired 12 December 1947 to November 1948; stowed 22 August 1967
143	526	Greenough	9 December 1938	9 August 1946	22 July 1969	Stowed 15 July 1969
144	527	Harvey	15 February 1939	28 November 1945	22 July 1969	Oil fired 26 December 1947 to 14 April 1949 and July 1949 to 3 November 1949
145	528	Murray	11 April 1939	25 October 1946	21 February 1950	Oil fired 26 December 1947 to 13 April 1949 and from 4 July 1949; destroyed by fire Kalgoorlie 31 July 1949
146	529	Gascoyne	18 May 1939	12 April 1946	29 February 1968	Oil fired 12 December 1947 to 4 May 1948 and 19 November 1948 to 4 October 1949
147	530	Murchison	16 June 1939	15 March 1946	22 July 1969	Oil fired 17 December 1947 to 3 September 1948; stowed 3 August 1967
453	531	Brunswick	6 June 1941	1 March 1946	6 October 1969	
454	532	Fortescue	1 August 1942	29 March 1946	11 September 1967	Stowed 31 July 1967
455	533	Chapman (later Coongan)	9 September 1941	1 November 1946	29 February 1968	Swapped nameplates with 535
456	534	Irwin	24 October 1942	8 March 1946	19 April 1968	Oil fired July 1949 to October 1949; stowed 2 June 1964
457	535	Coongan (later Chapman)	30 July 1941	2 October 1946	11 September 1967	Swapped nameplates with 533
459	536	Denmark	24 November 1941	11 October 1946	29 February 1968	Oil fired 21 December 1948 to 23 August 1949
461	537	Hotham	23 June 1944	21 June 1946	18 January 1968	Stowed 3 March 1964
464	538	Kalgan	2 June 1944	22 February 1946	10 February 1969	Stowed 27 June 1968

== See also ==
- Rail transport in Western Australia
- List of Western Australian locomotive classes
