= Burt Street, Boulder =

Road in Boulder, Western Australia

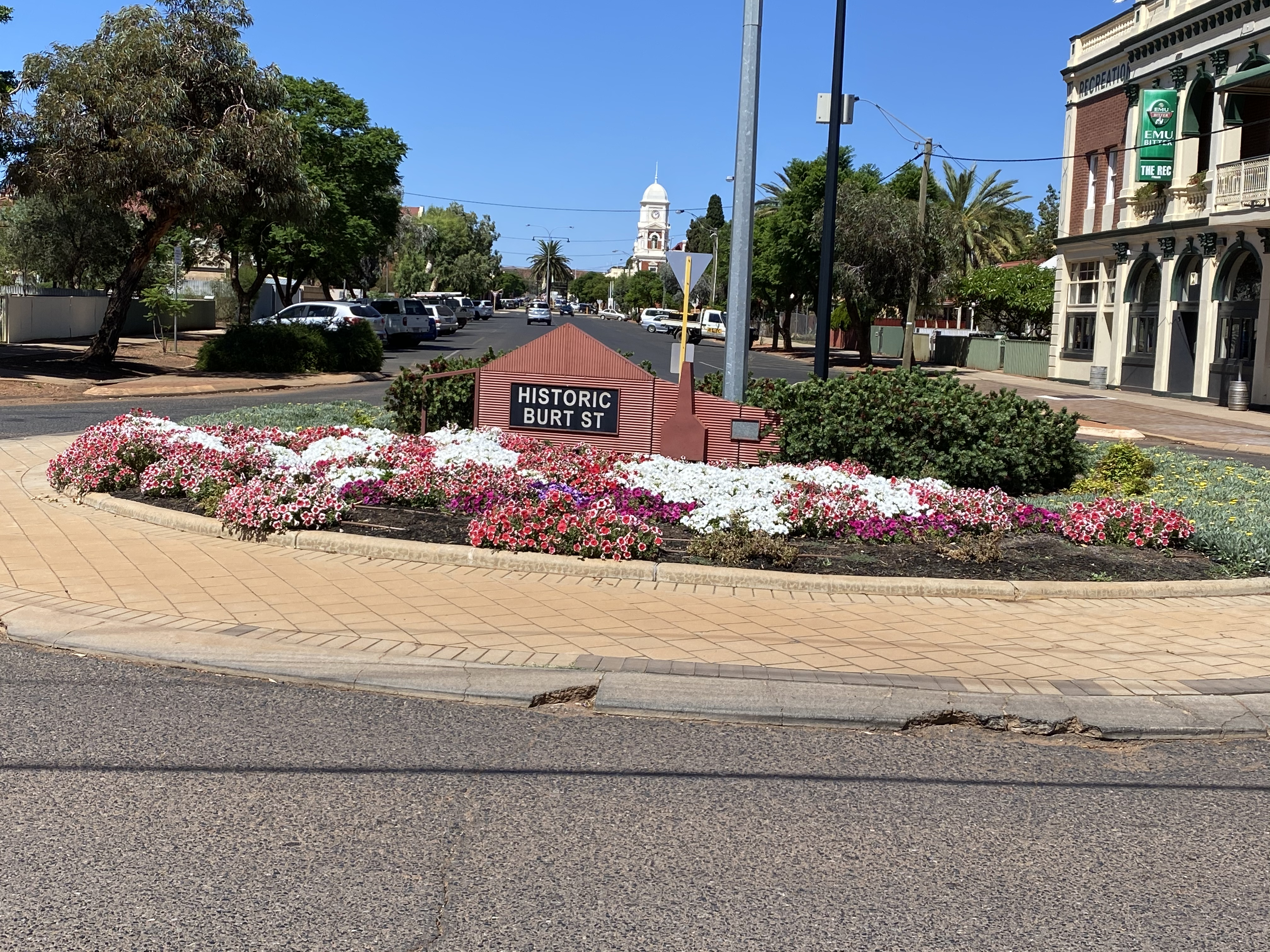

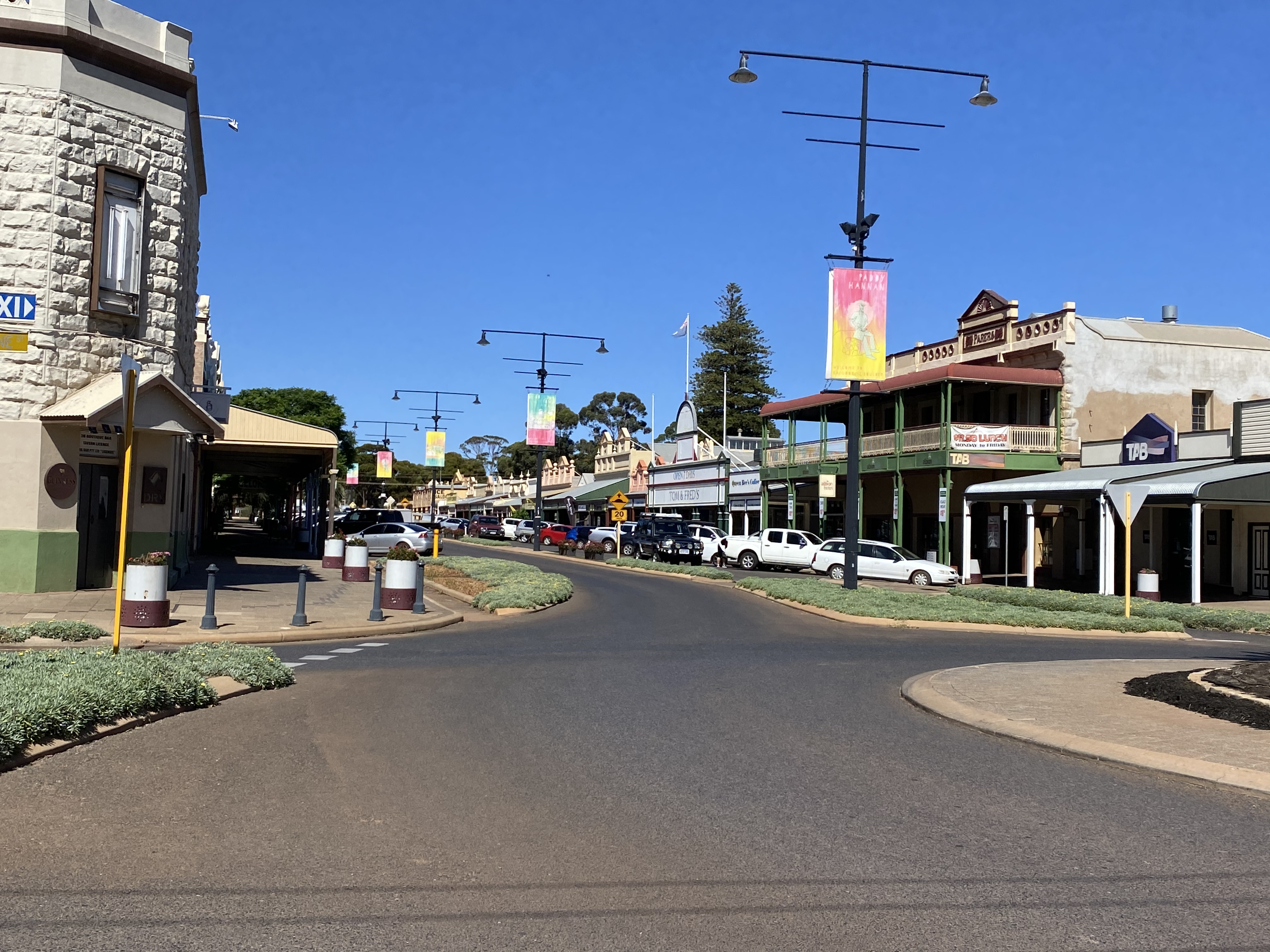
Looking south Burt St, 22 February 2021

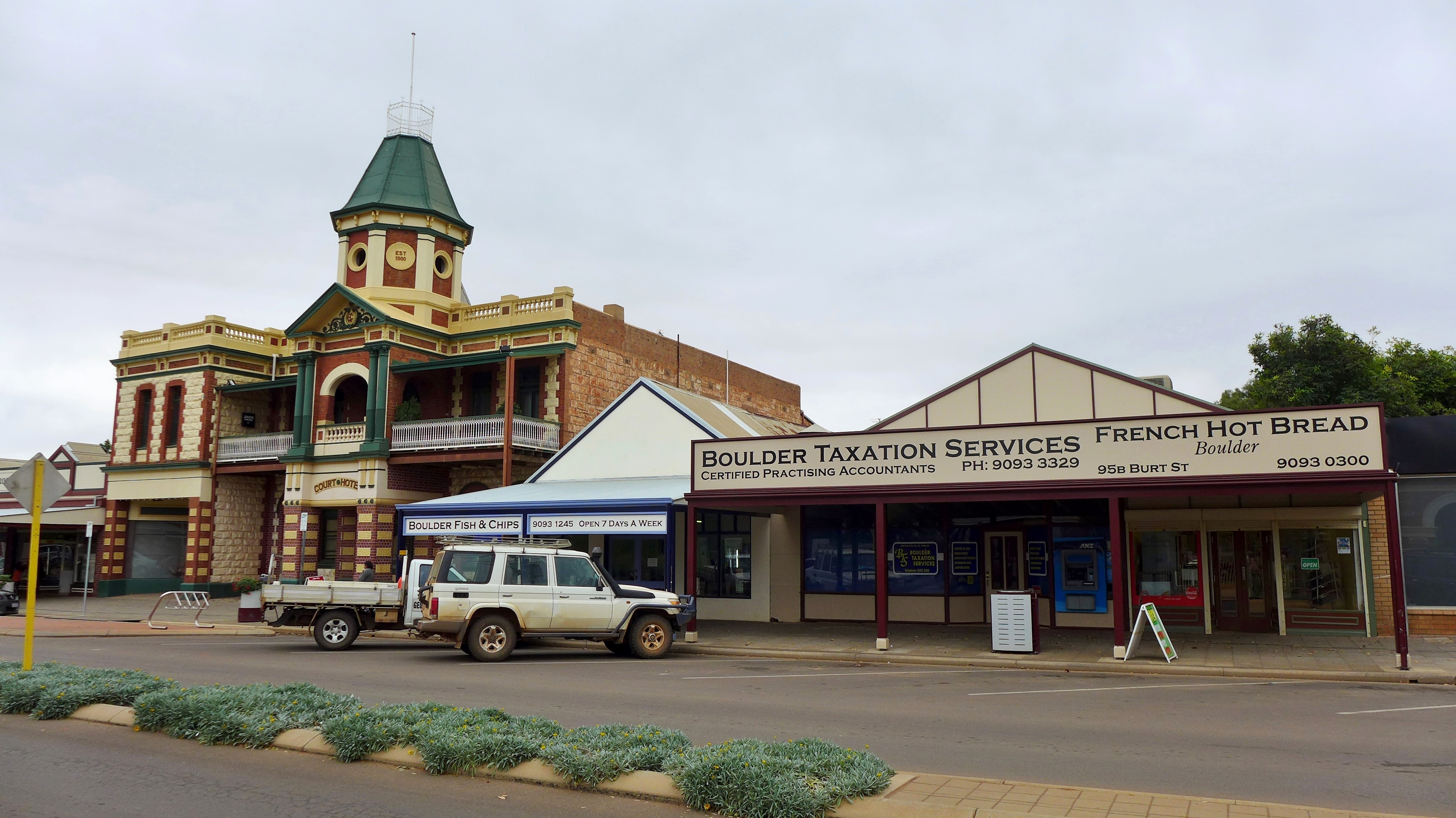
View of Burt Street, Boulder. The Court Hotel in on the left

Burt Street is the main street in Boulder, Western Australia. It runs between Gatacre Drive in the west, and the junction and roundabout at Hamilton Street, across from what had been Boulder railway station and is now the Loopline railway station. A separate section on the other side of the railway line continues to Goldfields Highway.

The three blocks, between Hamilton Street, Brookman Street and Lionel Street have the history of Boulder commercial and administrative activity and heritage in the buildings.
