= WAGR F class =

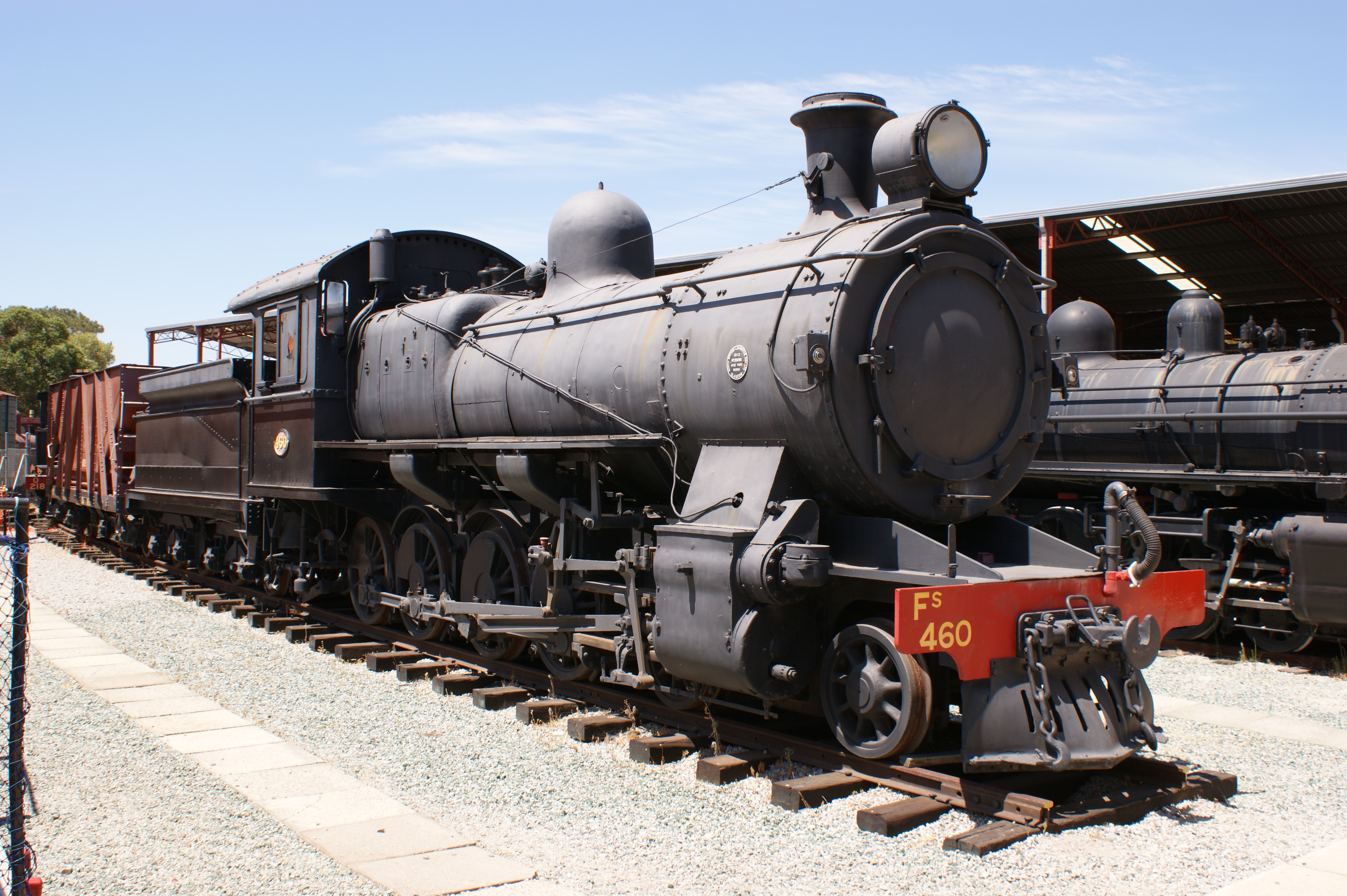
- Fs460 at the Western Australian Rail Transport Museum
Type and origin
- Power type: Steam
- Designer: T.F. Rotheram
- Builder: Dübs & Co; North British Locomotive Company
- Serial number: 4023-4037, 19655-19666, 20083-20112
- Total produced: 57
Specifications
- Configuration
  - Whyte: 4-8-0
- Gauge: 3 ft 6 in (1,067 mm)
- Length: 54 ft 4 in (16.56 m)
- Fuel type: Coal
- Boiler pressure: As built: 180 lbf/in^{2} (1.24 MPa); Superheated: 175 lbf/in^{2} (1.21 MPa)
- Cylinder size: As built: 17 in × 23 in (432 mm × 584 mm); Superheated: 18 in × 23 in (457 mm × 584 mm)
Performance figures
- Power output: As built: 21,115 lbf (93.92 kN); Superheated: 26,082 lbf (116.02 kN)
Career
- Operators: Western Australian Government Railways
- Numbers: F276-F290, F356-F367, F394-F423
- First run: 1902
- Retired: 1970
- Preserved: F452, Fs460
- Disposition: 2 preserved, 55 scrapped

The WAGR F class was a class of 4-8-0 heavy goods steam locomotives operated by the Western Australian Government Railways (WAGR) between 1902 and 1970.

== History ==
A total of 57 F class were built in three batches, fifteen in 1902, twelve in 1912 and thirty in 1913. The first batch was built by Dübs & Co, and the other two by its successor, the North British Locomotive Company. The class was designed by T.F. Rotheram, Chief Mechanical Engineer of the WAGR from 1900 to 1903. It was an enlarged version of the New Zealand Railways' B class, which had been designed under Rotherham's direction in 1896. The class was introduced to replace the K class on the Eastern Goldfields Railway. After World War II they were replaced as main line locomotives by the S and V classes.

The last two engines of the second batch, 366 and 367, were delivered with Schmidt superheaters, and were the first superheated locomotives to enter service in Western Australia. They were designated as class Fs. Between 1924 and 1948, all bar 398, 401, 403 and 415 were retrofitted with superheaters, and reclassified as Fs class engines. Some were renumbered in 1949/1950. Towards the end of their lives, some had their superheaters removed as an economy measure.

Two have been preserved, F452 at Collie and Fs460 at the Western Australian Rail Transport Museum.

== Class lists ==
The numbers and periods in service of each member of the F class were as follows:

First batch, built by Dübs & Co in 1902:
Builder's number	First number	Second number	In service	Superheated	Withdrawn	Notes
4023	276		16 August 1902	20 December 1924	23 March 1961	Oil fired 1 December 1947 to 30 September 1949
4024	277	424	30 October 1902	22 November 1924	15 October 1962	Renumbered 1 November 1949
4025	278	425	25 August 1902	4 April 1925	1 September 1961	Renumbered 17 November 1949
4026	279		22 August 1902	19 July 1924	4 September 1947	Oil fired 22 December 1936 to June 1938
4027	280	426	3 September 1902	26 September 1941	30 November 1961	Renumbered 15 November 1949
4028	281	427	6 September 1902	13 December 1924	23 November 1962	Renumbered 15 February 1950
4029	282		10 September 1902	6 September 1924	14 January 1954	Oil fired 12 December 1947 to 25 June 1948 and 24 March 1949 to 4 October 1949
4030	283		13 September 1902	6 June 1925	16 May 1961	Oil fired 17 December 1947 to 20 August 1948
4031	284		25 October 1902	22 August 1933	4 September 1947	
4032	285		23 October 1902	29 April 1936	6 September 1962	Oil fired 6 June 1947 to 30 September 1949
4033	286		8 October 1902	20 September 1924	17 August 1951	Oil fired 18 July 1945 to 12 July 1946, 21 December 1946 to 14 February 1947 and 29 April 1949 to 3 November 1949
4034	287		14 October 1902	28 February 1925	15 October 1962	
4035	288		15 November 1902	23 November 1929	30 November 1959	Ran with boiler fitted with round top firebox 30 September 1911 to 4 July 1929
4036	289		1 November 1902	9 May 1941	8 March 1961	Oil fired 9 November 1945 to 5 July 1946, 21 December 1946 to 21 February 1947 and 19 December 1947 to 17 November 1948
4037	290		18 October 1902	29 November 1924	1 March 1962	Oil fired 30 October 1945 to 21 June 1946 and 22 December 1947 to 12 October 1949

Second batch, built by North British Locomotive Company in 1912:
Builder's number	First number	Second number	In service	Superheated	Withdrawn	Notes
19655	356		2 March 1912	19 September 1935	22 July 1969	Stowed 20 June 1964
19656	357		5 March 1912	29 March 1935	22 July 1969	Oil fired 19 December 1947 to 30 September 1948 and ? to 21 December 1949; stowed 1964
19657	358		5 March 1912	2 September 1937	22 July 1969	Oil fired 17 December 1947 to 25 June 1948; stowed 26 June 1964
19658	359		7 March 1912	30 May 1941	22 July 1969	Stowed 26 October 1960 to 17 April 1961 and 29 May 1964
19659	360		6 March 1912	30 October 1940	22 July 1969	Superheater removed 10 May 1963; stowed 1964
19660	361	441	29 February 1912	5 December 1941	6 October 1969	Renumbered 8 November 1949; stowed 29 July 1964
19661	362		20 July 1912	21 November 1940	22 July 1969	Superheater removed 6 June 1963
19662	363		27 July 1912	13 December 1930	22 July 1969	Stowed 27 January 1965
19663	364	444	20 July 1912	27 July 1939	9 November 1964	Renumbered 17 November 1949; stowed 15 May 1963
19664	365		27 July 1912	6 September 1930	10 September 1970	Stowed 28 June 1961 to 27 April 1962 and 13 June 1970
19665	366		23 November 1912		24 August 1953	Built with Schmidt superheater; oil fired 4 December 1947 to 19 August 1948
19666	367	447	16 November 1912		22 July 1969	Built with Schmidt superheater; renumbered 18 November 1949; stowed 1964

Third batch, built by North British Locomotive Company in 1913:
Builder's number	First number	Second number	In service	Superheated	Withdrawn	Notes
20083	394	448	21 June 1913	22 December 1937	22 July 1969	Renumbered 21 December 1949;stowed 23 August 1965
20084	395	449	14 June 1913	10 March 1939	10 September 1970	Renumbered 19 December 1949; stowed 21 February 1970
20085	396	450	14 June 1913	24 September 1932	6 October 1969	Renumbered 2 December 1949; superheater removed 23 August 1961; stowed 16 December 1964
20086	397	451	21 June 1913	19 June 1943	10 September 1970	Renumbered 4 April 1950; oil fired 3 December 1948 to 30 September 1949; stowed 3 August 1965 to 21 January 1966 and 18 June 1970
20087	398	452	7 June 1913	1 October 1947	17 June 1971	Renumbered 5 December 1949; superheater removed 20 August 1962; preserved at Collie
20088	399		2 August 1913	24 April 1940	22 July 1969	Stowed 31 July 1963 to 18 March 1964 and 15 July 1969
20089	400	454	26 July 1913	17 May 1935	10 February 1969	Renumbered 20 April 1950; stowed 20 June 1964 to 15 September 1964
20090	401		19 July 1913	9 June 1939	4 September 1947	Boiler removed, reclassified F, and stowed 22 December 1945
20091	402	455	19 July 1913	18 May 1929	22 July 1969	Renumbered 25 May 1950; oil fired 27 September 1945 to 12 July 1946 and 14 December 1946 to 18 March 1947; superheater removed 28 August 1964
20092	403	456	26 July 1913	9 November 1948	20 July 1967	Renumbered 14 December 1949; superheater removed 20 August 1963
20093	404	457	19 July 1913	9 August 1930	6 October 1969	Renumbered 28 November 1949; superheater removed 10 December 1962; stowed 15 December 1966
20094	405	458	26 July 1913	29 October 1937	22 March 1956	Renumbered 6 December 1949
20095	406	459	19 July 1913	16 August 1940	22 July 1969	Renumbered 18 November 1949; stowed 1964
20096	407	460	19 July 1913	10 December 1937	14 August 1972	Renumbered 21 December 1949; stowed 28 August 1962 to 26 July 1963; preserved at the Western Australian Rail Transport Museum
20097	408	461	26 July 1913	7 December 1945	10 September 1970	Renumbered 17 November 1949; stowed 16 February 1970
20098	409	462	23 August 1913	31 August 1929	27 September 1967	Renumbered 2 October 1949; superheater removed 11 February 1963; stowed 31 July 1967
20099	410	463	30 August 1913	27 February 1936	30 August 1967	Renumbered 2 October 1949; stowed 31 July 1967
20100	411		23 August 1913	26 May 1933	20 July 1967	Superheater removed 7 November 1962; stowed 31 May 1967
20101	412		6 September 1913	3 April 1940	29 February 1968	Oil fired 19 March 1948 to 11 October 1949; superheater removed 21 March 1963
20102	413		6 September 1913	23 August 1935	10 February 1969	Superheater removed 24 June 1964
20103	414		30 August 1913	18 July 1941	22 July 1969	Stowed 27 January 1965
20104	415		30 August 1913	22 September 1950	22 July 1969	Stowed 1 April 1964
20105	416		16 August 1913	4 September 1936	22 July 1969	Stowed 3 September 1964
20106	417		30 August 1913	11 November 1938	1 May 1967	Stowed 10 April 1967
20107	418		23 August 1913	8 November 1930	20 July 1967	Superheater removed 14 July 1962
20108	419		13 September 1913	16 December 1942	22 July 1969	Superheater removed 5 October 1962; stowed 1964
20109	420		20 September 1913	16 December 1938	22 July 1969	Fitted with ACFI feedwater heater 23 August 1935 to 16 December 1938
20110	421		20 September 1913	15 April 1933	6 October 1969	Stowed 17 December 1964 to 18 August 1965 and 12 July 1969
20111	422		13 September 1913	7 May 1935	22 July 1969	Oil fired 18 December 1947 to 13 September 1949; stowed 29 July 1964
20112	423		21 March 1914	16 April 1932	17 June 1971	Stowed 12 July 1969

== Namesake ==
The F class designation was reused in the 1960s when the F class diesel locomotives were acquired with the Midland Railway of Western Australia.

== See also ==
- Rail transport in Western Australia
- List of Western Australian locomotive classes
