= Boulder railway station =

Former railway station in Western Australia

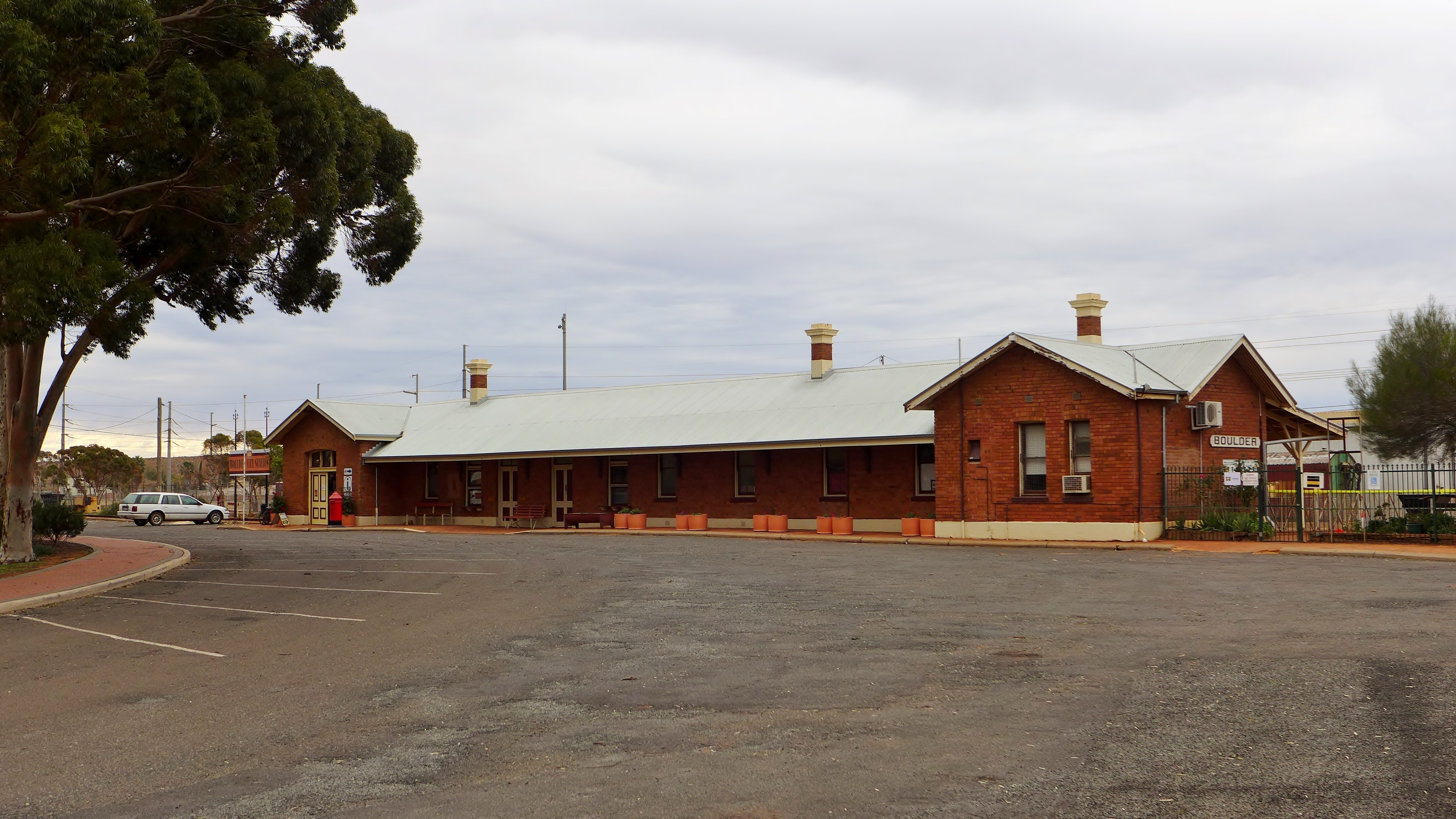
- Boulder railway station in 2016
- Interactive map of the Boulder railway station area

General information
- Type: Heritage listed building
- Location: Boulder, Western Australia
- Coordinates: 30.7827°S 121.4923°E

Western Australia Heritage Register
- Type: State Registered Place
- Designated: 13 July 2001
- Reference no.: 4639

Boulder railway station was part of the Boulder loopline, a railway that commenced at the Kalgoorlie railway station and travelled south for the purpose of transporting workers to the mines on the Golden Mile in Kalgoorlie-Boulder in Western Australia.

In its early days it was also known as the Boulder City Station.

Pressure in the early 1900s was for the loopline to be developed, and it was operational by 1903.

The loopline in its original form was closed in the 1950s, but the station building and portions of the original loopline remain.

For a period prior to the expansion of the Kalgoorlie Super Pit gold mine the loopline railway was able to have operations on part of the original railway.

Recent expansion of the Super Pit has erased most of its former route, but the Goldfields loopline railway is headquartered at the station and in 2015 the state government allocated funds to rebuild the line.

The railway station operates currently as a museum and revenue raiser for the Loopline organisation.

The railway station forecourt, across from the Hamilton and Burt Street roundabout, houses the Boulder war memorial.
