= Kalgoorlie railway station =

Railway station in Kalgoorlie, Western Australia

Kalgoorlie
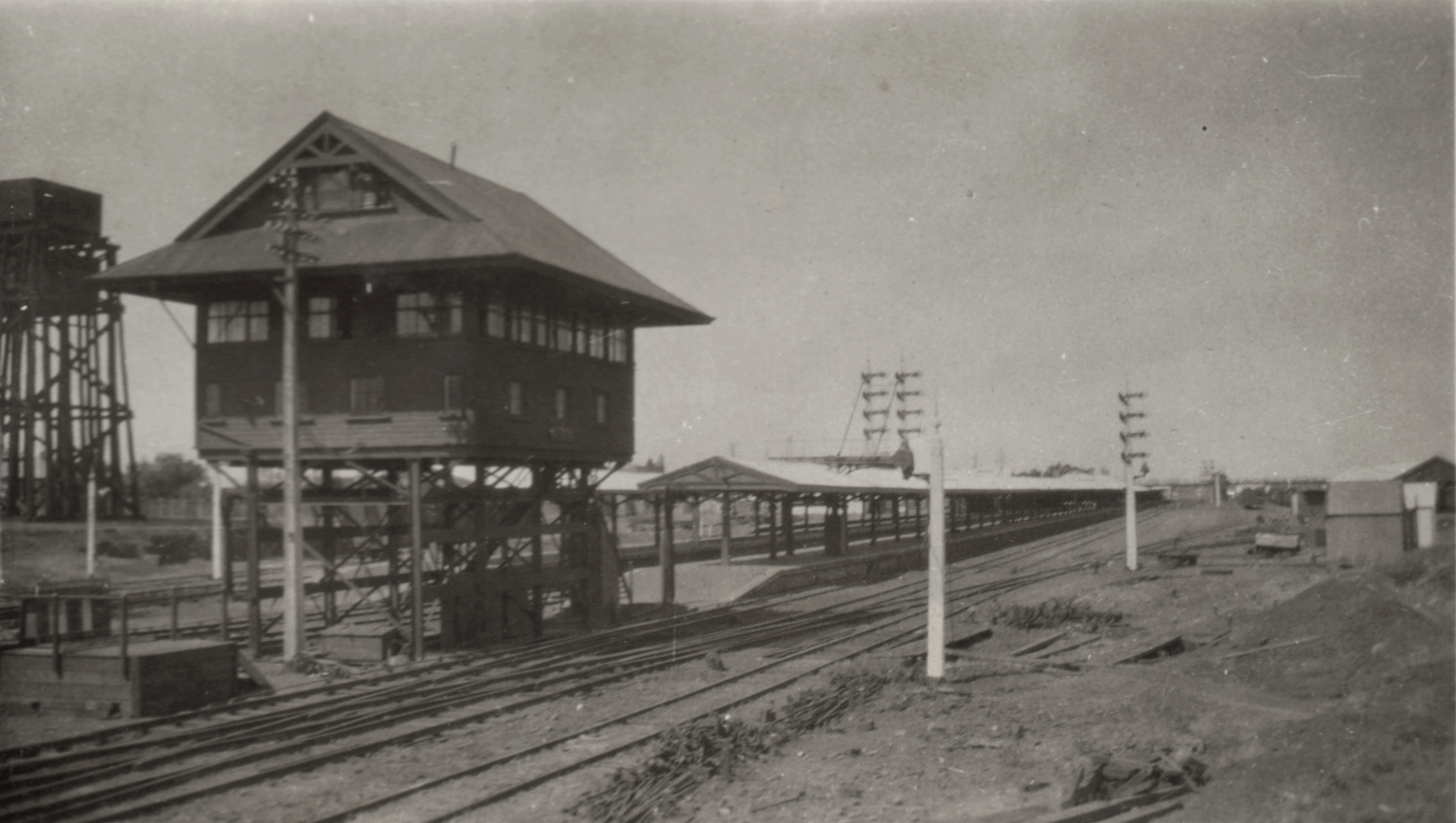
- View of the signal box and station platform looking west in November 1930

General information
- Location: Forrest Street, Kalgoorlie
- Coordinates: 30.7460°S 121.4669°E
- Elevation: 1,234 feet (376 m)
- Owner: Transwa
- Operator: Transwa
- Lines: Eastern Goldfields Railway; Trans-Australian Railway
- Distance: 653 kilometres from Perth
- Platforms: 3 (1 side, 2 bay)

Construction
- Structure type: Ground
- Accessible: Yes

History
- Opened: 8 September 1896

Services
Preceding station	Transwa	Following station
Bonnie Vale towards East Perth	Prospector	Terminus
Preceding station	Journey Beyond	Following station
Perth One-way operation	Indian Pacific	Cook towards Sydney

Western Australia Heritage Register
- Type: State Registered Place
- Designated: 14 December 2001
- Reference no.: 1279
Location

Kalgoorlie railway station is the easternmost attended station in Western Australia, located at the eastern terminus of the Eastern Goldfields Railway. It serves the city of Kalgoorlie. Beyond Kalgoorlie, the line continues east as the Trans-Australian Railway.

== Establishment ==
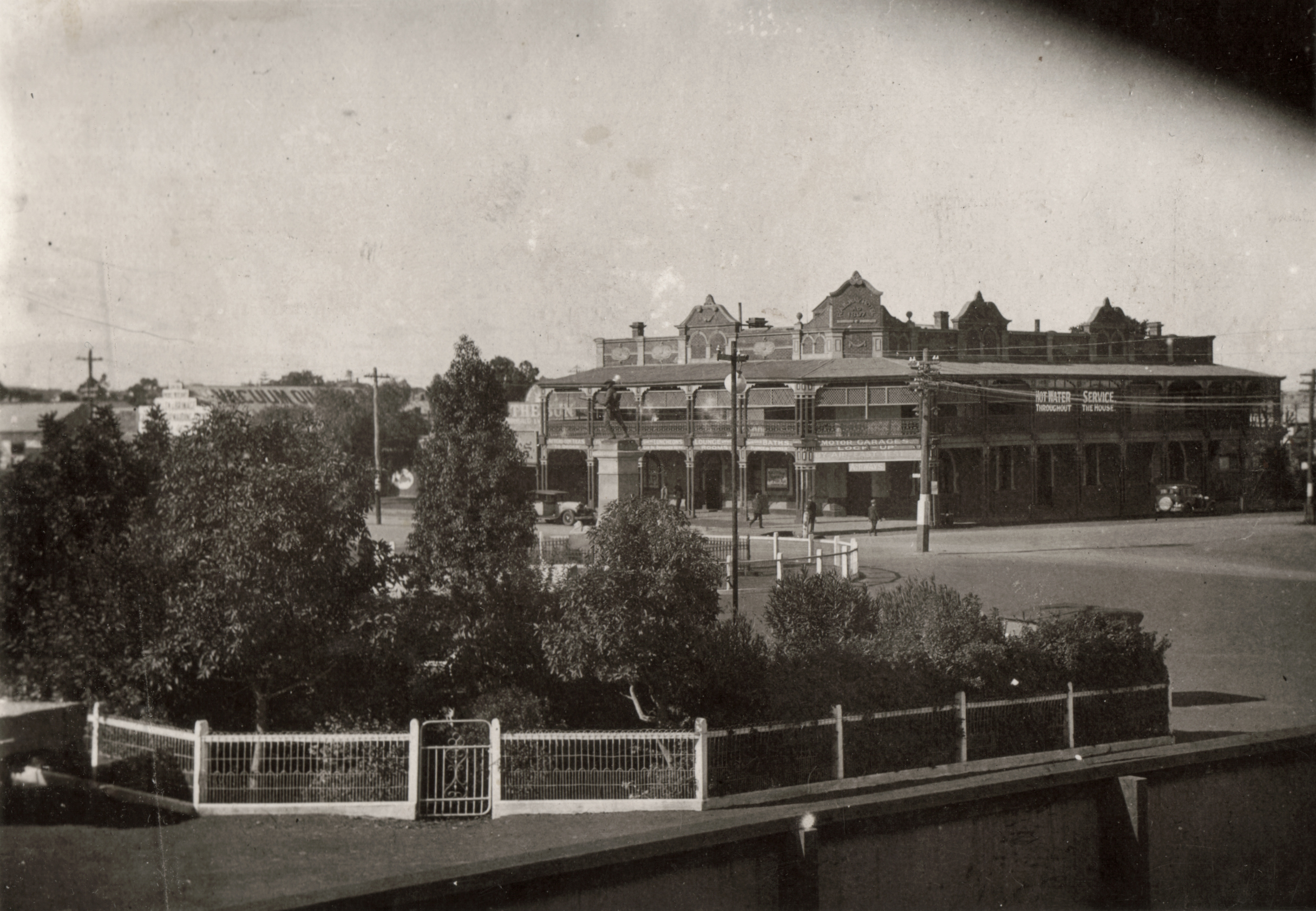
View from the station in May 1931

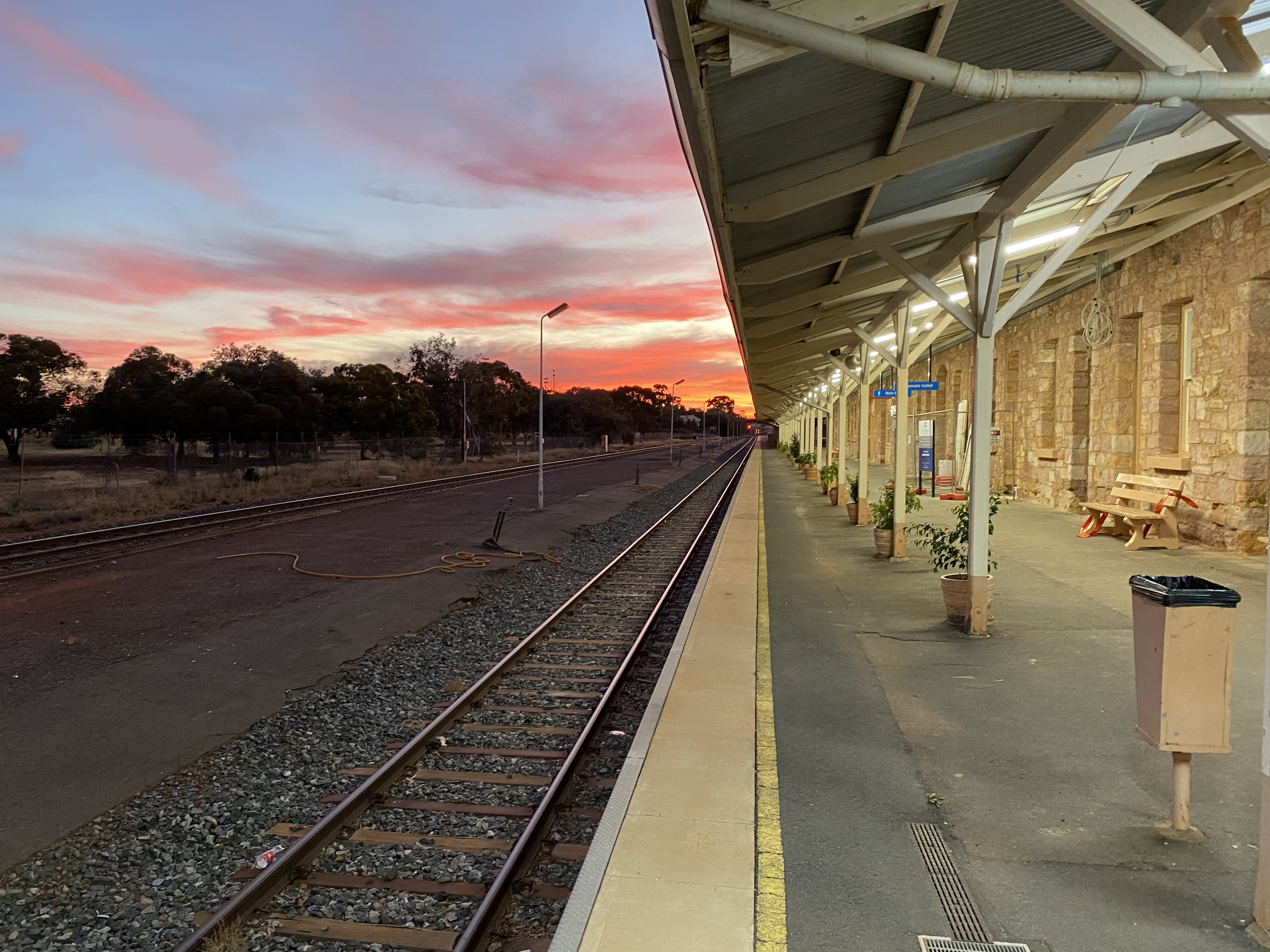
Sunrise over Kalgoorlie Railway Station, 27 May 2021

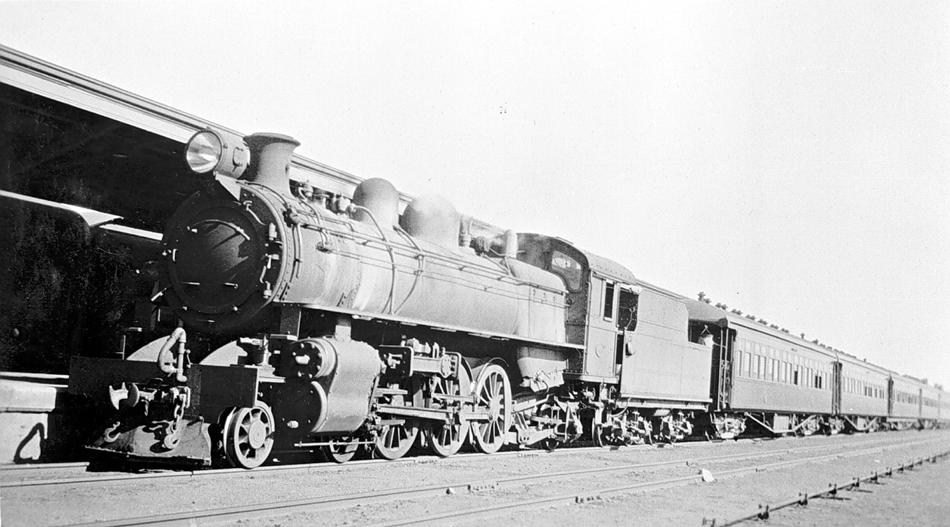
WAGR P class locomotive with the Kalgoorlie Express at the station in 1935

Construction of the railway station and yard was begun in the late 1890s, as part of the extension of the Eastern Goldfields Railway from Coolgardie in January 1897. The station was formally opened by the Governor of Western Australia, Lieutenant-Colonel Sir Gerard Smith, at a ceremony held on the station platform on 8 September 1896.

In the early stages of the development of railways in the Eastern Goldfields, it was the junction for the following railways:

- Kalgoorlie to Boulder, the Boulder Townsite Loop railway line, opened 8 November 1897
- Kalgoorlie to Kanowna, the Kalgoorlie to Kanowna railway line, opened 6 December 1897
- Kalgoorlie to Menzies, on the Kalgoorlie to Leonora railway line, opened 24 March 1898

In 1917, Kalgoorlie became a break-of-gauge station when the Commonwealth Railways' standard gauge Trans-Australian Railway from Port Augusta opened. This ceased on 3 August 1968, when the Eastern Goldfields Railway was gauge converted.

== Loop line ==
Surveyed in 1899, the line went from Kalgoorlie station. The platform linking to the line was at the east end and on the south side of the main platform.

Due to costs and passenger decline, in 1920, some of the stations listed below were reduced in status by ceasing to be booking stations: Hannan Street, Golden Gate, Brown Hill and Trafagar. In 1921, fares increased. In 1930, the passenger service was closed.

=== Near Kalgoorlie station ===
- Maritana Street Bridge
- Victoria Street
- Hannan Street
- Hanbury Street – the junction

=== Western side ===
- Robert Street
- Coombe Street
- Halfway
- Kallaroo

=== Inner western side ===
- Hainault
- Fimiston
- Horseshoe

=== Boulder Loop ===
- Golden Gate – junction
- Dunlop Crossing
- Clancy Street
- Boulder railway station
- Forrest Street
- Ivanhoe Crossing
- Kamballie – junction

=== Eastern side ===
- Trafalgar
- Hillend
- Brown Hill
- Croesus
- Williamstown

== Platform ==
The main platform was at one point, the longest in Western Australia at 527 metres. It was eclipsed by the new East Perth Terminal platform, built for the 1969-70 extension of standard gauge into Perth.

At each end of the main platform used by the Indian Pacific are bay platforms; the three to the east (adjacent to the former water tank and signal box) were where Boulder and Brown Hill loop lines and Trans-Australian passenger services arrived; and the western one is where the current Prospector services terminate. The eastern bays gradually fell out of use after the withdrawal of passenger services on the Boulder and Brown Hill loop lines, and the extension of the standard gauge line and Trans-Australian train to Perth.

== Location and commemorations ==
Due to it being the western terminus of the Trans-Australian Railway, the station has been the location of a number of commemorations and ceremonies from the opening of that railway in 1917 and since.

== Services ==
Kalgoorlie is served by the Transwa Prospector rural train service and the Indian Pacific. It was also previously served by the Kalgoorlie Express, The Westland and Trans Australian.

The Prospector service runs to and from East Perth once or twice each day.

=== Indian Pacific ===
The Indian Pacific also stops here. It runs once a week each way between East Perth and Sydney Central.

== See also ==
- Transwa Prospector § Stops
