= The Westland =

Train operated by the Western Australian Government Railways

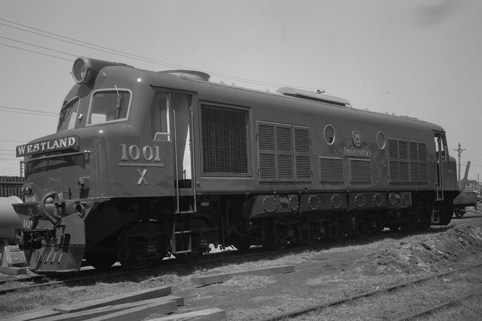
- X1001 with a Westland nameplate in 1954

Overview
- Service type: Overnight passenger train
- Status: Ceased
- First service: 4 June 1938
- Last service: 15 June 1969
- Successor: Trans Australian
- Former operator: Western Australian Government Railways

Route
- Termini: Perth; Kalgoorlie
- Service frequency: 3 x per week
- Train number: 83/84
- Lines used: Eastern; Eastern Goldfields

On-board services
- Classes: First & second

The Westland was the name given in 1938 to the overnight train operated by the Western Australian Government Railways (WAGR) with sitting and sleeping cars between Perth and Kalgoorlie, where it connected with the Trans-Australian service to Adelaide.

== History ==
Following the opening of the Eastern Goldfields Railway to Kalgoorlie in December 1887, a service from Perth commenced. Although not named, it was often referred to as the Great Eastern Express, Kalgoorlie Express or Kalgoorlie Passenger.

Following the opening of the Trans-Australian Railway in October 1917, its importance increased with the commencement of the Trans-Australian Express from Port Augusta in South Australia. By May 1921, a separate overnight express for interstate passengers and mail was introduced and this became the connecting train with the Trans-Australian Express.

On 4 June 1938, the service was relaunched and renamed The Westland with Pr class locomotives rostered. It included sitting and sleeping cars (both first and second class). A dining car was attached between Perth and Northam where it was detached having served dinner on the eastbound service. It was then attached to the westbound service for breakfast. Refreshment rooms were also provided at major stations for passengers wishing to purchase cheaper snacks and drinks. World War II austerity measures saw the lounge cars removed until March 1946. On 28 March 1948, it was again relaunched with new AH class steel sleeping carriages with the other carriages refurbished. This was to be the last improvement to the train, although the introduction of the X class diesel-electric locomotives in 1954 marginally reduced traveling time.

== Demise ==
With the line between Perth and Kalgoorlie gauge converted to standard gauge, The Westland was replaced on 15 June 1969 by the Trans Australian which now operated from Port Pirie through to East Perth.

The standard gauge line followed a new alignment through the Avon Valley of the Darling Scarp east of Perth. This was the first section of the new line to be constructed, tracks on this section being 1,435 mm (4 ft 8 1/2 in) and 1,067 mm (3 ft 6 in) dual gauge. For a short time before its demise, The Westland was routed via the new Avon Valley line, and the original ascent of the Darling Scarp via the Swan View Tunnel and Chidlow was closed.

== Sources ==
- Higham, Geoffrey (2007). Marble Bar to Mandurah: A History of Passenger Rail Services in Western Australia (1st ed.). Bassendean: Rail Heritage WA. ISBN 978-0-9803922-0-3. OCLC 271545712. Wikidata Q140375689.
