= Kanowna railway line =

Former railway line in Western Australia

Kalgoorlie to Kanowna railway line
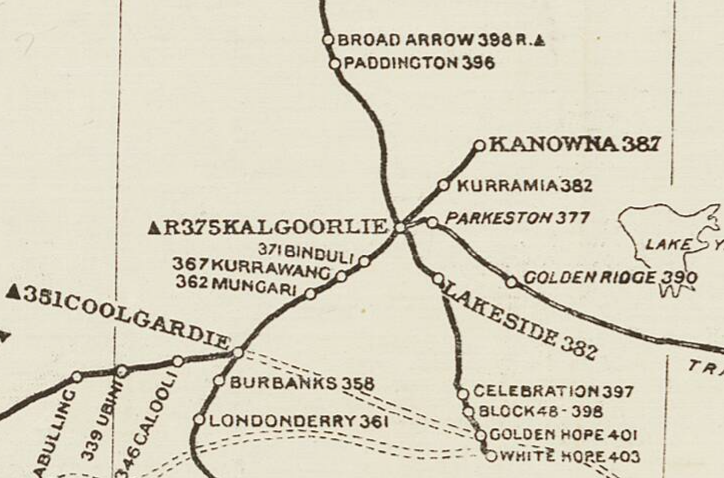
- Railway lines in the Kalgoorlie area in 1928 (distances in miles)

Overview
- Owner: Government of Western Australia
- Locale: Goldfields–Esperance, Western Australia
- Termini: Kalgoorlie; Kanowna

Service
- Operator(s): Western Australian Government Railways

History
- Commenced: 1897
- Opened: 15 June 1898
- Closed: 1928

Technical
- Line length: 20 km (12 mi)
- Track gauge: 1,067 mm (3 ft 6 in)
- Kalgoorlie to Kanowna railway line Main locations

The Kalgoorlie to Kanowna railway line was a 20-kilometre-long (12 mi) state government-owned and WAGR-operated railway line in the Goldfields–Esperance region of Western Australia, connecting Kalgoorlie to Kanowna. At Kalgoorlie, it connected to the Eastern Goldfields Railway.

== History ==
The Kalgoorlie–Kanowna Railway Act 1896, an act by the Parliament of Western Australia granted assent on 27 October 1896, authorised the construction of a railway line from Kalgoorlie to Kanowna.

The contract to construct the railway line was awarded to Smith & Timms on 11 September 1897 and the new line was officially opened on 15 June 1898.

By 1927, the Kanowna line as well as the near-by Kamballie to Lakeside and Lakeside to White Hope lines were under threat of closure by Parliament. At this point, the Kanowna line had already languished for a number of years. A 1922 Royal Commission report had recommended its closure but the state government had not followed the advice, hoping the situation would improve. The line was in need of costly repairs but had only seen occasional use in its final years and the lack of future mining prospects in the Kanowna area meant that investment in the line could not be justified.

The Kanowna line had cost £54,000, equivalent to A$9.8 million in 2022, to construct as well as a further £A 6,900 in interest repayments. In the three years leading up to 1927, it had cost £A 630 in working expenses to run the line but only earned £A 201. In 1927, eight trains had operated on the line, run once 102 tonnes (100 long tons) of freight had accumulated, predominantly sandalwood.

The following year, in 1928, it was announced that refurbishing the Kanowna line would cost £A 8,000, equivalent to A$727,800 in 2022, an unjustifiable expenditure. Opposition to the removal of line had declined at this point as its usage had not been reviewed and the assets of the line could be used on other agricultural railways in the state. Local officials from the Kalgoorlie Road Board however objected to the pulling up of the railway line, preferring to leave the line dormant until conditions improved, with no immediate investment into it.

The Railways Discontinuance Act 1928, assented to on 10 December 1928, authorised the closure of the railway line as well as the Kamballie to Lakeside section of railway line.
