= Kalgoorlie to Gnumballa Lake railway line =

Former railway line in Western Australia

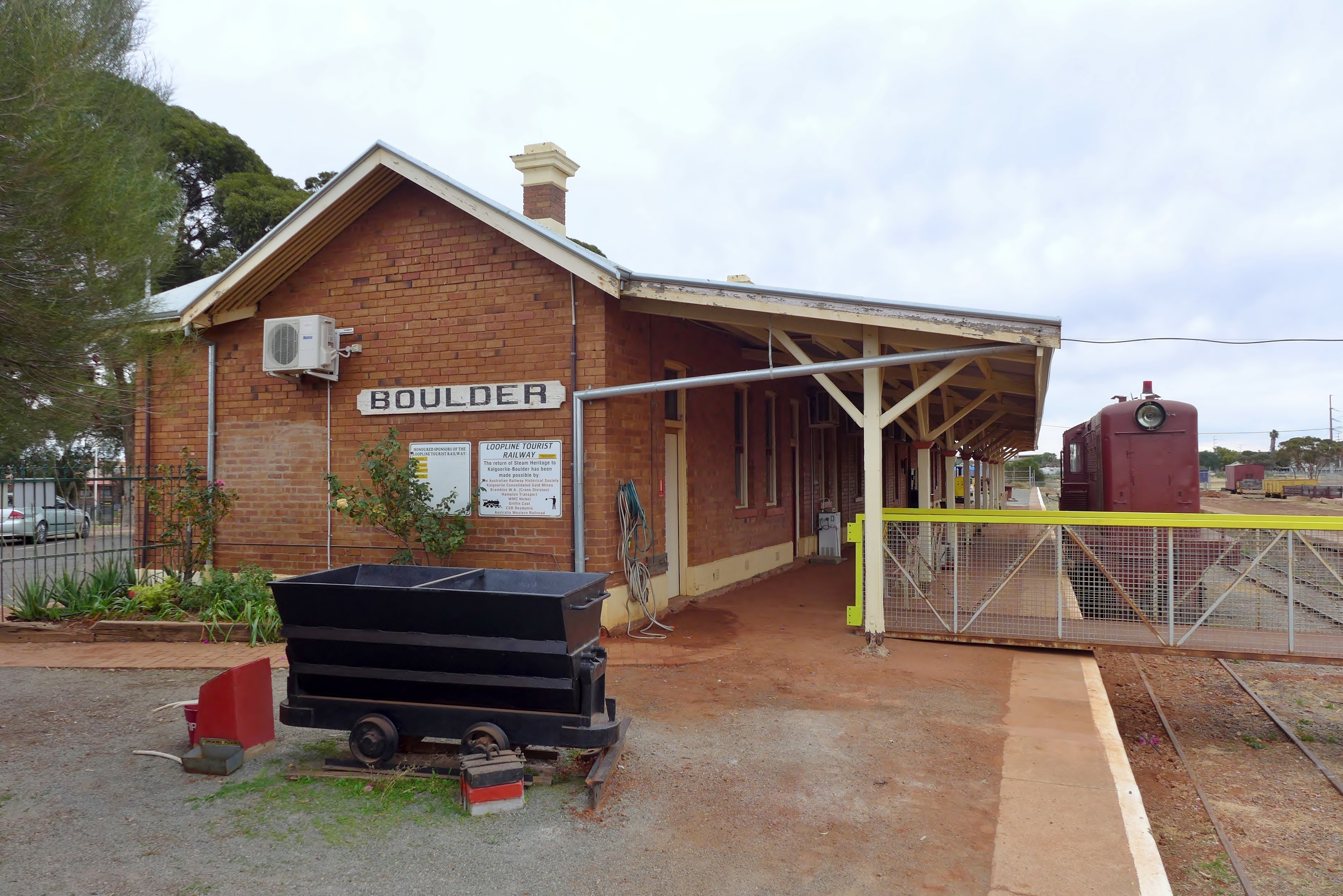
- Boulder railway station in 2016 with advertising for the Loopline Tourist railway

Overview
- Owner: Government of Western Australia
- Locale: Goldfields–Esperance, Western Australia
- Termini: Kalgoorlie

Service
- Operator(s): Western Australian Government Railways

History
- Commenced: 1897
- Opened: 8 November 1897
- Closed: 1976

Technical
- Track gauge: 1,067 mm (3 ft 6 in)
- Kalgoorlie to Gnumballa Lake railway line Main locations

The Kalgoorlie to Gnumballa Lake railway line was a set of state government-owned and WAGR-operated railway lines in the Goldfields–Esperance region of Western Australia. It connected Kalgoorlie to Lakeside, at Gnumballa Lake (now Hannan Lake or Hannan's Lake), as well as Boulder, through the Boulder Townsite Loop railway line and Brown Hill, through the Brown Hill Loop railway line. At Kalgoorlie, it connected to the Eastern Goldfields Railway. For a short duration in the 1920s, the railway line also continued on from Lakeside to Brown Hill.

Much of the area of the former railway line has been taken up by the open pit operations of the Super Pit gold mine.

== History ==
Railway lines in the Kalgoorlie area in 1928 (distances in miles)

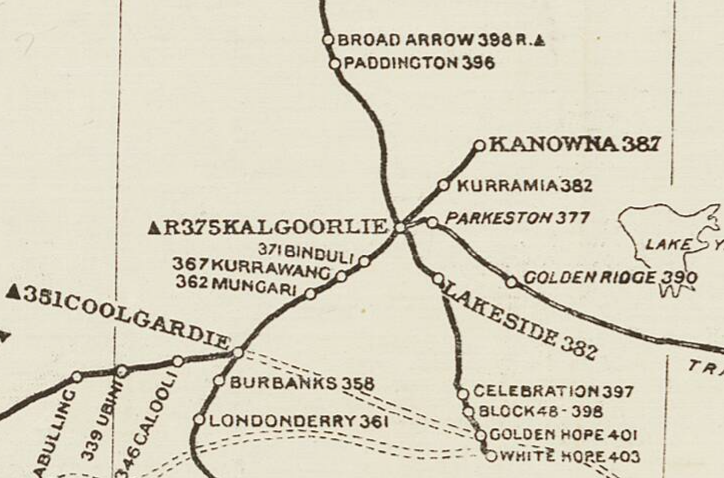
The White Hope extension of the line ...

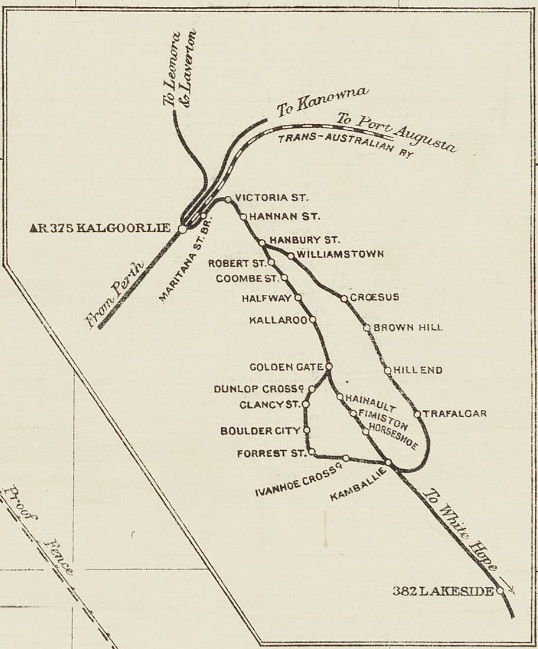
... and the loop lines

To service the newly-established gold mines at Boulder, local mining companies proposed to construct private railway lines connecting the town and mines to Kalgoorlie but the Western Australian government was not willing to permit the construction of private railway lines. Instead, a Kalgoorlie to Boulder tramway was constructed by the Western Australian Public Works Department and the new line was officially opened on 8 November 1897. It was referred to as a tramway instead of railway as the later would require approval by Parliament, which was obtained only after construction.

The Kalgoorlie–Gnumballa Lake and Boulder Townsite Loop Railways Act 1897, an act by the Parliament of Western Australia granted assent on 23 December 1897, authorised the construction of an 11-kilometre (6.8 mi) long railway line from the Kalgoorlie railway station to Gnumballa Lake as well as a 3.14-kilometre (1.95 mi) loop railway branching off from the former to the Boulder railway station. This act was retrospective, authorising the construction of the already completed tramway, which thereby officially became a railway. The Boulder loop was also referred to as the Inner Circle.

Initial railway facilities were very basic, with no stations or platforms and the Boulder station master operating and sleeping in a rail car until proper facilities were constructed. Passengers alighted at wherever the train stopped but services were nevertheless popular and well-frequented. The trains were essential to take miners to their work in the gold mines, with as many as 100 trains passing through Boulder every day. Trains between Boulder and Kalgoorlie, in the times up to 1916, were more frequent than Perth to Fremantle trains.

More important than passenger transport was the wood carried on the railway for the mines as support in underground operations and firewood. The wood was sourced through timber railway lines that connected to the main line.

The Brown Hill Loop Kalgoorlie-Gnumballa Lake Railway Act 1900, assented to on 5 December 1900, authorised the construction of a loop railway line from Hannan Street station to Kamballie station via Brown Hill. The contract to construct the loop railway was awarded to the Public Works Department in March 1901 and the loop was officially opened on 17 March 1902. The line had become necessary as the population at the east side of the mines had risen considerably, at one point 10,000 people living there. This loop line was also referred to as the Outer Circle.

The busiest station on the line was Golden Gate station, which handled a train every ten minutes.

Because of congestion on the line, the section from Kalgoorlie to Kamballie via Boulder was duplicated from 1900. By 1904 a Kalgoorlie to Boulder tramway was also established, which competed with the railway line and caused financial loses for the later. The new tramway, a separate entity from the original one, had been authorised by the Boulder Tramways Act 1904 and was operated by Kalgoorlie Electric Tramways Limited.

On 17 June 1925, a 37-kilometre (23 mi) extension of the railway line from Lakeside to White Hope was opened as a government railway. The line had originally been constructed by the Woodline Company and was purchased by the government for £18,000 in June 1924, with the aim of assisting the development of the mines in the area. The rails used to construct the line were of low quality and the track was in poor condition at the time. The government had spent £2,878 operating the line since takeover and a further £1,392 on interest while earning £2,699 in revenue from it. Mining in the White Hope area had however ceased and no further mining development or revenue was expected from the railway line.

By 1927, the Kanowna line as well as the Kamballie to Lakeside and Lakeside to White Hope lines were under threat of closure by Parliament. The Railways Discontinuance Act 1928, assented to on 10 December 1928, authorised the closure of the Kalgoorlie to Kanowna railway line and the line from Kamballie to Lakeside as well as the one from Lakeside to White Hope.

By 1931, passenger services on the Brown Hill loop ceased as the houses in the area had been abandoned or dismantled because of the effects of the Great Depression, with the section closing completely in 1937.

The Railway (Brown Hill Loop Kalgoorlie–Gnumballa Lake) Discontinuance Act 1948, assented to on 11 November 1948, authorised the discontinuance of the loop railway from Hannan Street station to Kamballie station via Brown Hill.

In 1952, the tramline to Boulder was replaced by buses and the number of passenger services on the railway line reduced to two per day as well as one freight train to Kamballie.

The Railways (Standard Gauge) Construction Act 1961, assented to on 30 October 1961, authorised the conversion of certain railway lines in Western Australia to standard gauge, among them the 8-kilometre (5.0 mi) section from Kalgoorlie to Kamballie.

The Railways Discontinuance and Land Revestment Act 1974, assented to on 29 October 1974, authorised the discontinuance of the railway line to Gnumballa Lake and the Boulder and Brown Hill loops, as well as three other railway lines. Two of these latter three where also in the Kalgoorlie area, being the Coolgardie to Kalgoorlie and Coolgardie to Lake Lefroy sections.

Railway services on the line, now operated by Westrail, ceased by 1976. The Golden Mile Loopline Railway Society subsequently operated the line as a tourist railway. From 1989, the expansion of the Super Pit gold mine took up much of the land on which the line formerly lay.

From 1999, a joint venture of the Golden Mile Loopline Railway Society, the Kalgoorlie-Boulder City Council and the Kalgoorlie Consolidated Gold Mines Limited undertook the Loopline Heritage Restoration Project Plan, with the aim of preserving what was left of the former railway line. In 2004 the Loopline operations ceased, and in 2024 the society auctioned assets.

== Legacy ==
The Boulder loop line as well as the Boulder railway station, platform, goods shed and pedestrian bridges are listed on the Western Australian State Register of Heritage Places.
