= Railway Museum (Western Australia) =

Railway museum in Bassendean Western Australia

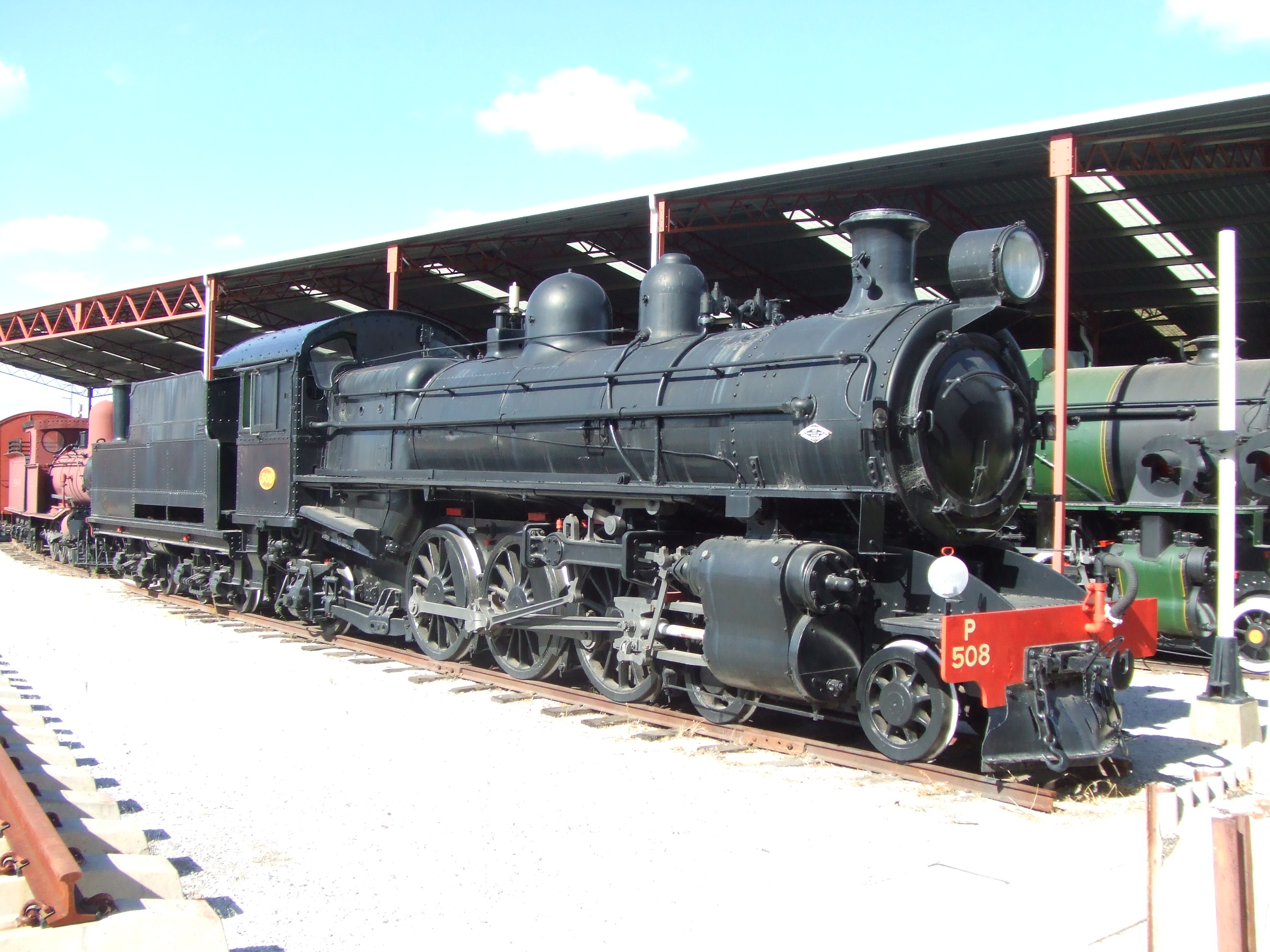
- P508 on display at Bassendean in April 2006
- The museum is located in Bassendean, Western Australia on Railway Parade between Ashfield Station and Bassendean Station on the Midland Line.
- Established: 1974; 52 years ago
- Location: Railway Parade, Bassendean, Western Australia
- Coordinates: 31°54′35″S 115°56′20″E
- Type: Railway museum
- Website: www.railheritagewa.org.au

The Railway Museum, also known as the Rail Transport Museum, is situated in Bassendean, Western Australia. It is run by Rail Heritage WA, the Western Australian division of the Australian Railway Historical Society (ARHS).

In the early days of operation it was at times known as the Western Australian Rail Transport Museum. On the internet and social media it has been referred to by diverse names variant on its location, such as Bassendean Railway Museum and Rail Heritage Museum Bassendean. The predominant name currently is Railway Museum.

== Collection ==
The museum has the most comprehensive collection of heritage steam locomotives and rolling stock in Western Australia. Originally developed in 1969 and officially opened in November 1974 by the Western Australian Minister for Transport Ray O'Connor, its collection comprises:

- Diesel Locomotives
- Steam Locomotives – include representatives of most classes that operated in the WAGR
- Passenger carriages
- Other rolling stock

== Archive ==
The onsite museum building houses an archive that includes an online photograph collection covering most of Western Australian railway history.

== Events ==
Various annual events have been held over time:

- Steamfest
- Railfest, which has included active steam and diesel displays
- Annual open days

The museum is also the location of the West Australian Model Railway Club.

A related museum called South-West Rail and Heritage Centre is situated in Boyanup.
