= Dobrowolski =

Dobrowolski (Polish pronunciation: [dɔbrɔˈvɔlski]; feminine: Dobrowolska; plural: Dobrowolscy) is a Polish-language surname.

| Language | Masculine | Feminine |
|---|---|---|
| Polish | Dobrowolski | Dobrowolska |
| Belarusian (Romanization) | Дабравольскі (Dabravolski) | Дабравольская (Dabravolskaja, Dabravolskaya, Dabravolskaia) |
| Russian (Romanization) | Добровольский (Dobrovolsky, Dobrovolskiy, Dobrovolskij) | Добровольская (Dobrovolskaya, Dobrovolskaia, Dobrovolskaja) |
| Ukrainian (Romanization) | Добровольський (Dobrovolskyi, Dobrovolskyy, Dobrovolskyj) | Добровольська (Dobrovolska) |

== People ==
- Andrzej Dobrowolski (1921–1990), Polish composer
- Antoni Bolesław Dobrowolski (1872–1954), Polish scientist
  - Dobrowolski Island, named after him
- Constantine Dobrowolski, (1906–after 1943), Nazi collaborator
- Ewelina Dobrowolska (born 1988), Lithuanian politician of Polish descent
- Franciszek Dobrowolski (1830–1896), Polish theatre director
- Gosia Dobrowolska (born 1958), Polish-Australian actress
- Jan Fryderyk Dobrowolski (born 1944), Polish composer
- Krzysztof Dobrowolski, Polish diplomat
- Rafał Dobrowolski (born 1983), Polish athlete
- Władysław Dobrowolski (1896–1969), Polish fencer
- Valentine Semibreve de Dobrowolski (1847–1896), composer
