= Anne Godfrey-Smith =

Australian poet, theatre director and women's activist

Anne Godfrey-Smith OAM BEM
- Born: Anne McIntyre; 30 November 1921; Launceston, Tasmania, Australia
- Died: 15 June 2011 (aged 89); Narrabundah, Australian Capital Territory
- Education: Frensham School; University of Sydney; Australian National University; Flinders University
- Occupations: Poet; theatre producer; women's activist
- Relatives: Margaret Edgeworth McIntyre, mother; Edgeworth David, grandfather
- Writing career
- Pen name: Anne Edgeworth
- Notable awards: ACT Citizen of the Year, 1994

Anne Godfrey-Smith OAM BEM (30 November 1921 – 15 June 2011) was an Australian poet, theatre director and women's activist.

== Early life and education ==
Godfrey-Smith was born on 30 November 1921 in Launceston, Tasmania. Her mother, Margaret Edgeworth McIntyre (née David), was the first woman to be elected to the Tasmanian parliament. Her father, William Keverall McIntyre, practised as an obstetrician.

Her education began in Launceston at Broadland House Church of England Girls Grammar School, but from 1935 to 1938 she was sent to board at Frensham School in Mittagong, New South Wales.

She graduated from the University of Sydney in 1941 with a BSc in biochemistry. She later took a BA at the Australian National University, followed by an MA at Flinders University for her thesis on Samuel Beckett.

== Career ==
In the 1940s, she worked as a pathologist at Sydney's Royal North Shore Hospital. Following her marriage, she and her husband, Rowland Anthony (Tony) Godfrey-Smith, moved to Launceston where she continued her involvement in theatre as part-time actor, producer and director with the Launceston Players, the company her mother had founded in 1926. When her husband undertook postgraduate training in England in 1950 she was given the opportunity by Tyrone Guthrie to spend five months at the Stratford-on-Avon Memorial Theatre where she developed her theatre production and management skills.

Returning to the Launceston Players, she also worked as producer/director for the local opera company. In 1953 she moved to Canberra as full-time producer and manager for the Canberra Repertory Society. The following year she was divorced by her husband on the grounds of desertion. In the late 1950s she married Robert Johnson and at the end of 1958 she resigned from Canberra Repertory Society.

In 1975, Godfrey-Smith was appointed by the National Youth and Children's Performing Arts Association to conduct an Australia-wide survey of young people and the performing arts, producing a detailed report on her findings in late 1977.

In the 1980s, she served on the Theatre Board of the Australia Council and in 1986 was appointed to the ACT Arts Development Board.

== Honours and recognition ==
Godfrey-Smith was awarded the British Empire Medal in the 1980 New Year Honours "for service to theatre". She was ACT Citizen of the Year in 1994, while in the 2005 Australia Day Honours she was recognised with the Medal of the Order of Australia "for service to the arts, particularly through a range of theatre, literary and cultural organisations".

== Death and legacy ==
Godfrey-Smith died in Narrabundah on 15 June 2011. She was survived by her two sons, Anthony ("Tony") Godfrey-Smith and William Grey.

Godfrey-Smith supported and encouraged writers in a variety of genres over many years. In 2013 her family established the Anne Edgeworth Trust, which provides a Fellowship in her memory to support emerging writers in the Canberra region. The Anne Edgeworth Fellowship has been administered by the ACT Writers Centre, which Godfrey-Smith was actively involved with when it was established in 1994. The ACT Writers Centre was renamed MARION in 2022, and continues to collaborate with the Anne Edgeworth Trust in supporting the Fellowship.

== Works ==
=== Poetry ===
- Edgeworth, Anne; Burns, Paul (1982), A view from two cities : selected poems, Kardoorair Press, ISBN 978-0-908244-06-5
- ——; Brissenden collection (1996), The road to Leongatha : poems of Anne Edgeworth, Kardoorair Press, ISBN 978-0-908244-26-3
- —— (1997), Poems of Canberra, ArtSound Incorporated, ISBN 978-0-646-31294-1
- —— (1999), Turtles all the way down, Wood, Beverley (illustrator), Boris Books, ISBN 978-1-876668-01-3
- —— (2007), Poems for off-duty hours, Ginninderra Press, ISBN 978-1-74027-456-2
- —— (2007), Purdie's meditation and other poems, Picaro Press

=== Prose ===
- Edgeworth, Anne (1977), Youth performing arts in Australia 1975–1977, Australian Youth Performing Arts Association, ISBN 978-0-9597462-1-1
- —— (1991), The Australian reference dictionary, Oxford University Press Australia, ISBN 978-0-19-553296-8
- —— (1995), The cost of jazz garters : a history of Canberra Repertory Society, 1932 to 1982 (2nd ed.), Diplomat Agencies, ISBN 978-0-646-25915-4

=== National Library holdings ===
- Edgeworth, Anne. "Bibliography". National Library of Australia.
- Edgeworth, Anne. "Papers of Anne Edgeworth, 1927-1990". National Library of Australia, Bib ID: 566937 [Manuscript].

== Sources ==
- O'Connor, Mark. "Anne Edgeworth Interview (1994)". National Library of Australia [sound recording, 15 sound tape reels; 7 in].
- Grey, William. "Memoir for Anne Edgeworth (1921–2011)". Academia.
