= Strait of Juan de Fuca =

Strait between Vancouver Island and the Olympic Peninsula

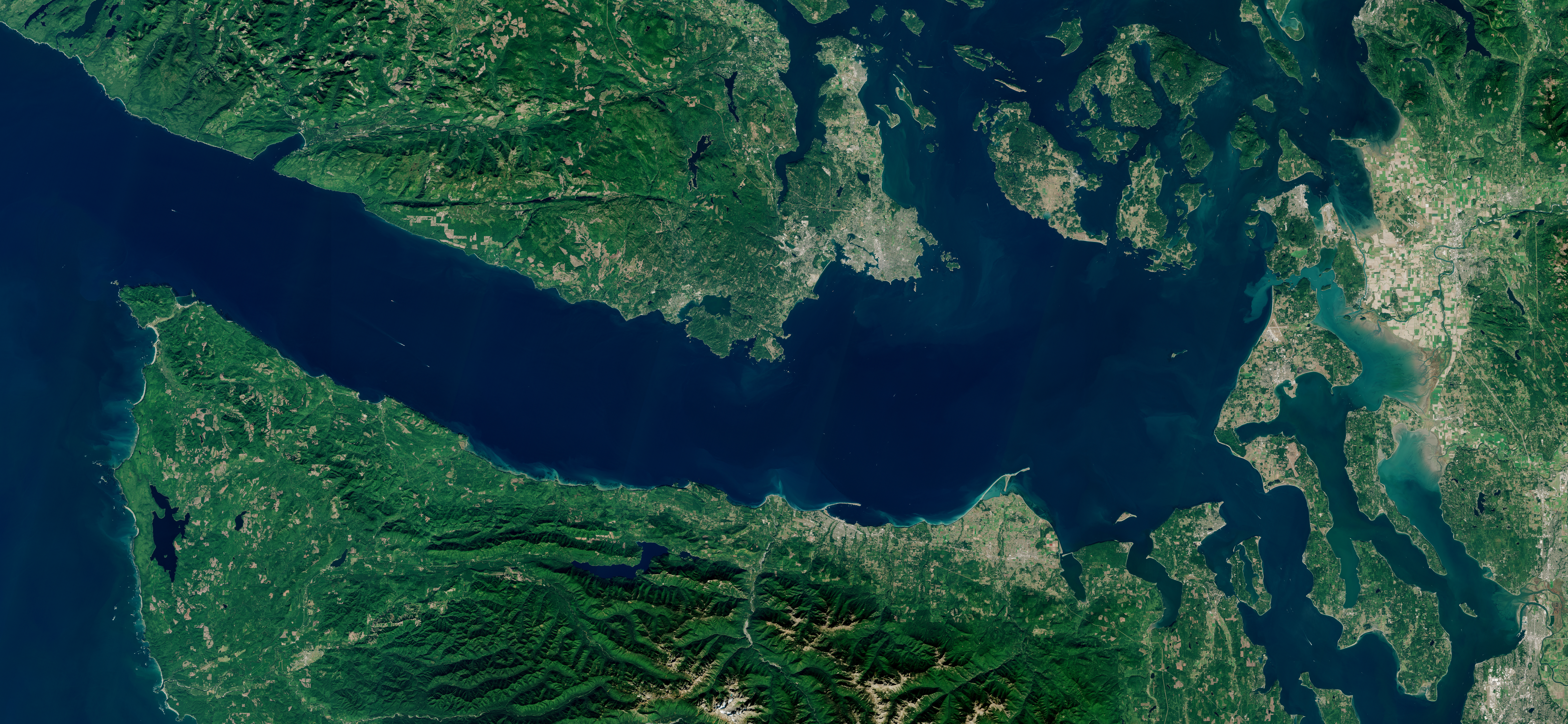
- Sentinel-2 image of the Strait of Juan de Fuca

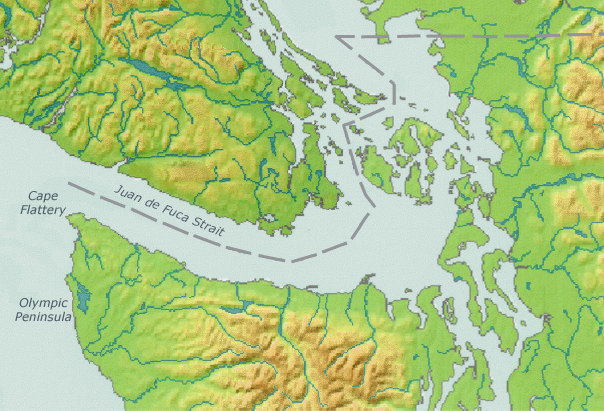
- Location within Strait of Juan de Fuca Location within Washington (state) Location within North America
- Location: British Columbia and Washington
- Coordinates: 48°13′30″N 123°33′30″W
- Type: Strait
- Part of: Salish Sea
- Basin countries: Canada and United States
- Max. length: 96 mi (83 nmi; 154 km)
- Max. width: 12 to 25 mi (10 to 22 nmi; 19 to 40 km)
- Average depth: 100 m (330 ft)

The Strait of Juan de Fuca (officially named Juan de Fuca Strait in Canada) is a body of water about 96 miles (83 nmi; 154 km) long that is the Salish Sea's main outlet to the Pacific Ocean. The international boundary between Canada and the United States runs down the centre of the Strait.

It was named in 1787 by the maritime fur trader Charles William Barkley, captain of Imperial Eagle, for Juan de Fuca, the Greek navigator who sailed in a Spanish expedition in 1592 to seek the fabled Strait of Anián. Barkley was the first recorded person to find the strait, unless Juan de Fuca's story was true.

Samuel Bawlf posited in 2003 that "Fuca's story was nothing more than a fabrication designed to extract money from the English government". The story would have been based on Francis Drake's 1579 exploration of the Northwest Passage at its western end. Drake would therefore have been more than likely the first European to ever sight the entry of the strait but would also have been the first to sail through when heading west after rounding Vancouver Island, sailing through the Strait of Georgia and sighting the entry to Puget Sound. Much of Bawlf's provocative thesis was based on the geographical information that started to leak following Drake's return to England and to show up in subsequent maps such as Ortelius's. Fuca's story would have originated from a pilot named Morera, part of Drake's expedition, who miraculously returned on his own before getting arrested by the Spanish.

While the U.S. Geological Survey Geographic Names Information System says John Meares named the strait in 1788, most sources say it was Barkley in 1787, for example: the BC Geographical Names Information System; Washington Secretary of State; Historical Atlas of the Pacific Northwest: Maps of exploration and Discovery; and The Nootka Connection: Europe and the Northwest Coast 1790–1795. It is well established that Meares tried to take credit for much of Barkley's work. The strait was explored in detail between 1789 and 1791 by Manuel Quimper, José María Narváez, Juan Carrasco, Gonzalo López de Haro, and Francisco de Eliza.

== Definition ==
The United States Geological Survey defines the Strait of Juan de Fuca as a channel. It extends east from the Pacific Ocean between Vancouver Island, British Columbia, and the Olympic Peninsula, Washington, to Haro Strait, San Juan Channel, Rosario Strait, and Puget Sound. The Pacific Ocean boundary is formed by a line between Cape Flattery and Tatoosh Island, Washington, and Carmanah Point (Vancouver Island), British Columbia. Its northern boundary follows the shoreline of Vancouver Island from Carmanah Point to Gonzales Point, then follows a continuous line east to Seabird Point (Discovery Island), British Columbia, Cattle Point (San Juan Island), Washington, Iceberg Point (Lopez Island), Point Colville (Lopez Island), and then to Rosario Head (Fidalgo Island). The eastern boundary runs south from Rosario Head across Deception Pass to Whidbey Island, then along the western coast of Whidbey Island to Point Partridge, then across Admiralty Inlet to Point Wilson (Quimper Peninsula). The northern coast of the Olympic Peninsula forms the southern boundary of the strait. In the eastern entrance to the Strait, the Race Rocks Archipelago is in the high current zone halfway between Port Angeles, Washington, and Victoria, BC.

== Climate ==
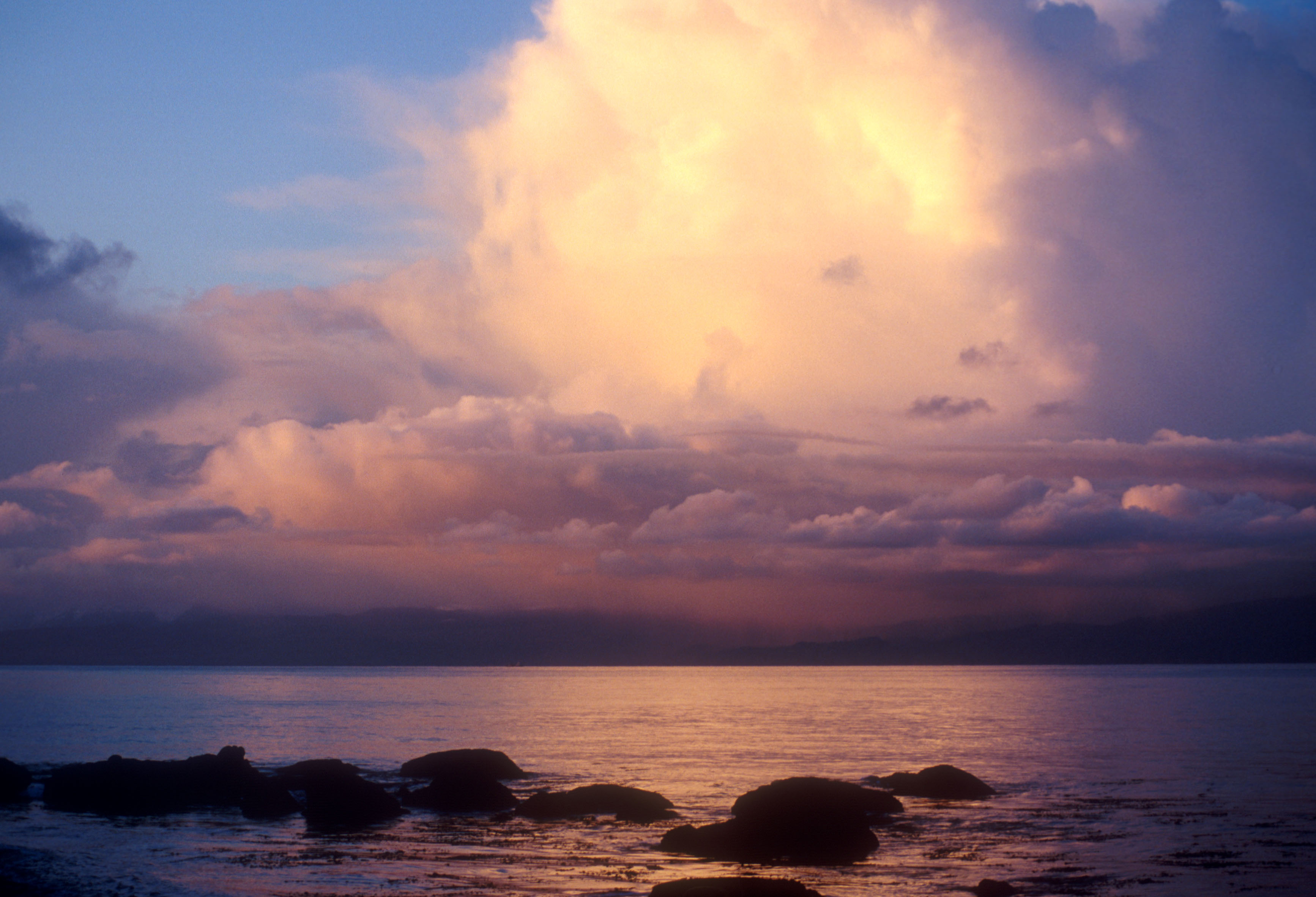
Sunset over the strait

Like the rest of the Salish Sea and surrounding regions, the climate of the Strait is disputed, with the Köppen system classifying it as Mediterranean, but most regional climatologists preferring oceanic. While the climate is mostly oceanic in nature, the dry summers result in the Mediterranean classification in the Köppen system. Rainfall ranges from over 100 inches (250 cm) (temperate rainforest) conditions at the west end to as little as 16 inches (410 mm) at the east end, near Sequim.

Because it is exposed to the generally westerly winds and waves of the Pacific, seas and weather in Juan de Fuca Strait are, on average, rougher than in the more protected waters inland, thereby resulting in a number of small-craft advisories, gale warnings, and storm warnings.

== Ferries ==
An international vehicle ferry, the MV Coho, crosses the Strait from Port Angeles, Washington, to Victoria, British Columbia, several times each day. It began operating in 1959, replacing an earlier ferry, and remains privately owned; the Coho carried 475,000 passengers and 130,000 vehicles in 2018. A passenger-only ferry on the same route, named the Victoria Express, operated from 1990 to 2011. Victoria is also the terminus of the Victoria Clipper, a passenger-only ferry from Seattle. Sidney, located northeast of Victoria, is served by a seasonal extension the Washington State Ferries system's route serving the San Juan Islands and Anacortes, Washington.

== Boundary dispute ==
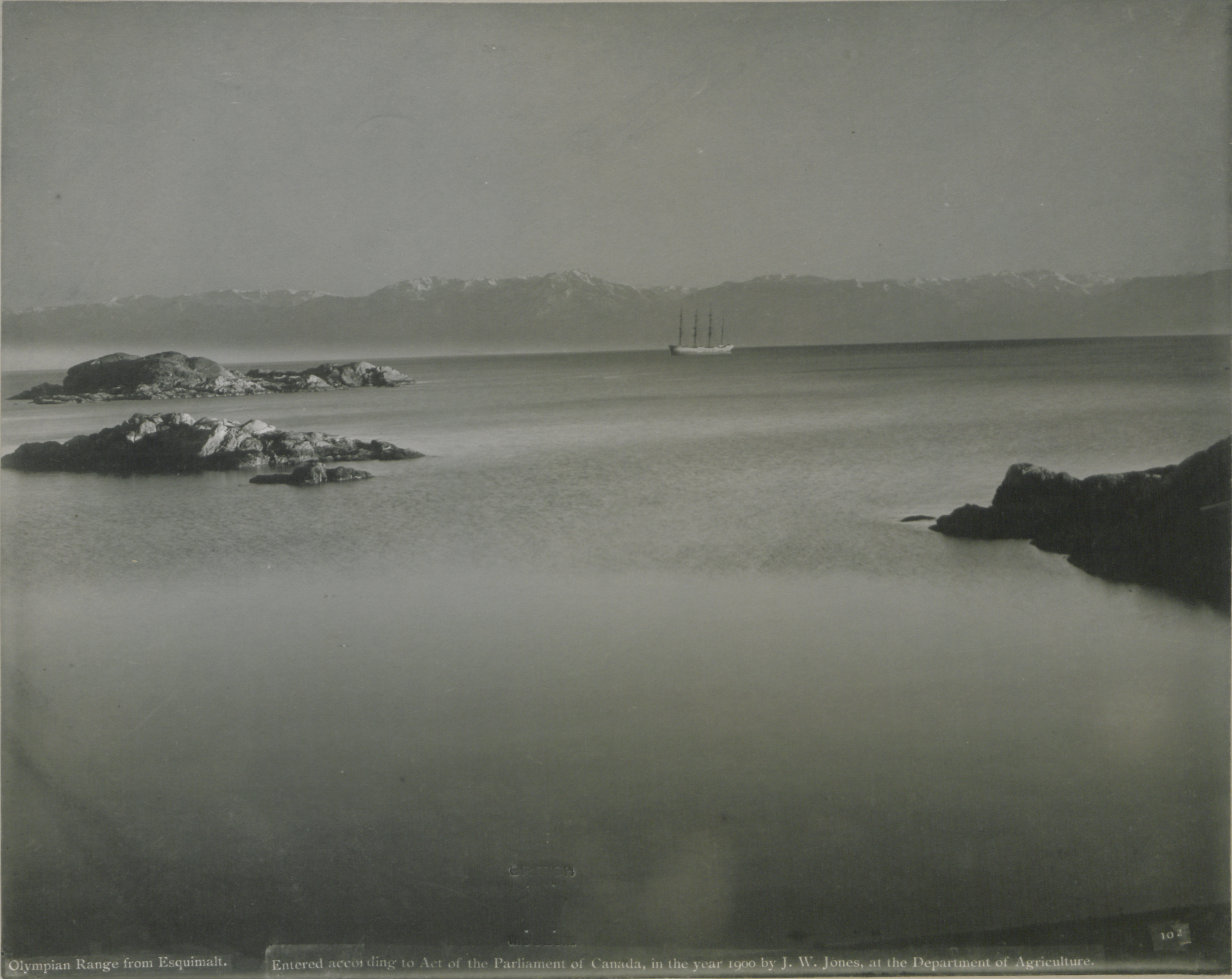
The Olympic Mountains of Washington as seen from the entrance to Esquimalt Harbour, 1900, photo: John Wallace Jones

This strait remains the subject of a maritime boundary dispute between Canada and the United States. The dispute is only over the seaward boundary extending 200 nautical miles (370 km) west from the mouth of the strait. The maritime boundary within the strait is not in dispute. Both governments have proposed a boundary based on the principle of equidistance, but with different basepoint selections, resulting in small differences in the line. Resolution of the issue should be simple, but has been hindered because it might influence other unresolved maritime boundary issues between Canada and the United States. In addition, the government of British Columbia has rejected both equidistant proposals, instead arguing that the Juan de Fuca submarine canyon is the appropriate "geomorphic and physiogeographic boundary". The proposed equidistant boundary currently marks the northern boundary of the Olympic Coast National Marine Sanctuary. British Columbia's position is based on the principle of natural prolongation which developed in international law. It poses a dilemma for the federal government of Canada. If Canada holds that the principle of natural prolongation applies to the Juan de Fuca Canyon on its Pacific Ocean coast, the assertion could undermine Canada's argument in the Gulf of Maine boundary dispute. In this Atlantic Ocean context, Canada favours an outcome based on the principle of equidistance.

== Salish Sea ==
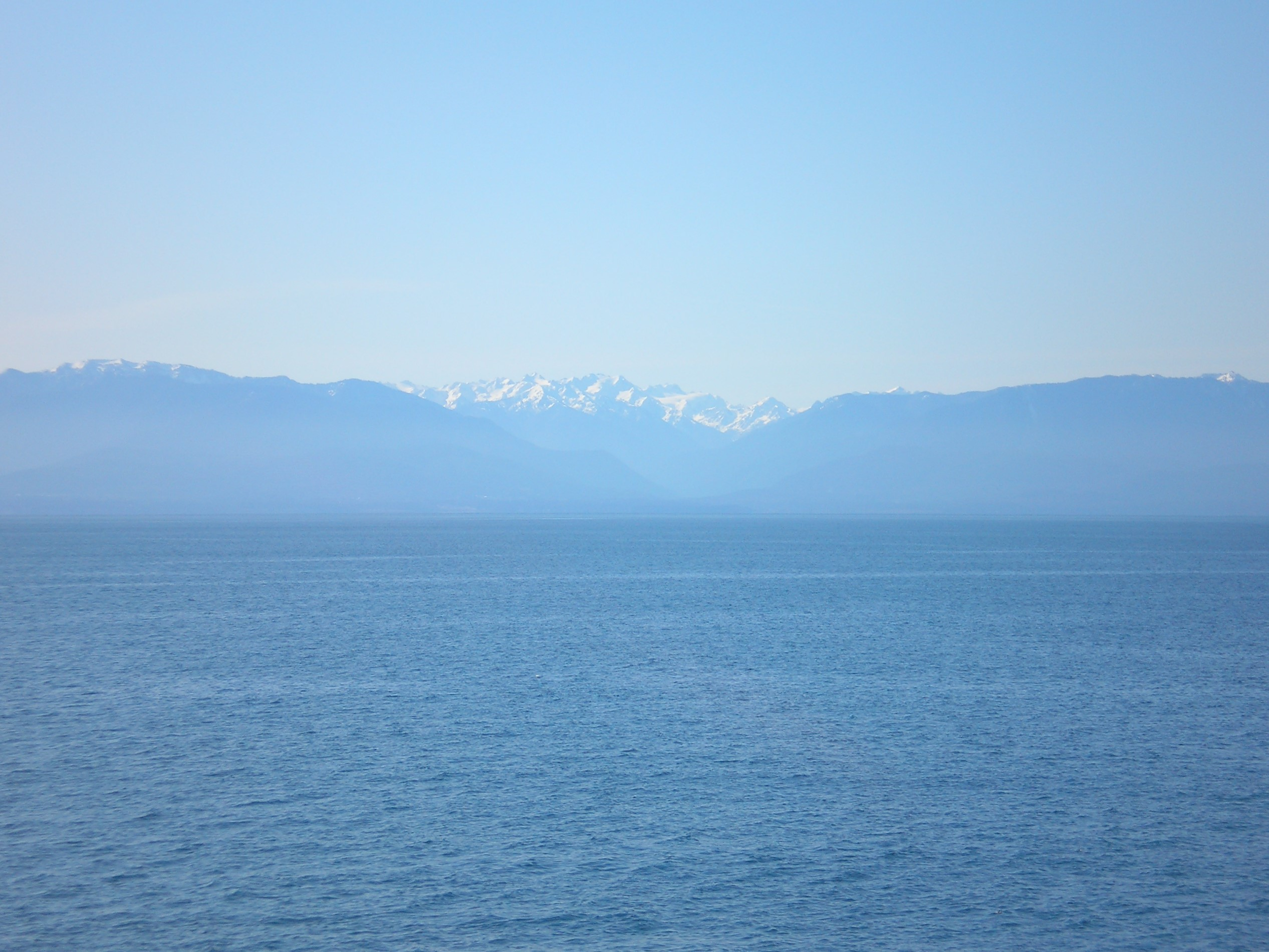
The Strait of Juan de Fuca and the Salish Sea with the Olympic Peninsula in the background

In March 2008, the Chemainus First Nation proposed renaming the strait the "Salish Sea", an idea that reportedly met with approval by British Columbia's Aboriginal Relations Minister Mike de Jong, who pledged to put it before the BC cabinet for discussion. Making Salish Sea official required a formal application to the Geographical Names Board of Canada. A parallel American movement promoting the name had a different definition, combining of the Strait of Juan de Fuca and Puget Sound as well as the Strait of Georgia and related waters under the more general name Salish Sea. This latter definition was made official in 2009 by geographic boards of Canada and the United States.

In October 2009, the Washington State Board of Geographic Names approved the Salish Sea toponym, not to replace the names of the Strait of Georgia, Puget Sound, and Strait of Juan de Fuca, but instead as a collective term for all three. The British Columbia Geographical Names Office passed a resolution only recommending that the name be adopted by the Geographical Names Board of Canada, should its US counterpart approve the name-change. The United States Board on Geographic Names approved the name on November 12, 2009.

== Counties and regional districts ==
Counties along the Strait of Juan de Fuca:

- Clallam County, Washington
- Jefferson County, Washington
- Island County, Washington
- Skagit County, Washington
- San Juan County, Washington
- Whatcom County, Washington

Regional districts along the Strait of Juan de Fuca:

- Capital Regional District, British Columbia
- Cowichan Valley Regional District

== Fauna ==
Certain groups of seabirds called common murre migrate north by swimming. Some Pacific Coast murres paddle north to the sheltered bays of the Strait of Juan de Fuca to feed on herring and other small fish.

Humpback whales can be observed near the western end of the Strait of Juan de Fuca, mostly from June to November, especially in areas near Neah Bay and La Push. There is a resident (non-nomadic) population of killer whale in the Strait and surrounding waters, where they feed on spawning Chinook salmon. The migrating, so-called "transient" populations of killer whale often prey on the California sea lion and Steller's sea lion, in addition to the gray whale, another cetacean with both residential and nomadic groups in the Strait. As migratory gray whales swim between Baja California and Alaska each year, they will often be seen in the Strait of Juan de Fuca, feeding on small marine creatures on the seafloor, and using the Strait as a sort of "rest stop" on their long journeys. They also socialize with and encounter the local, non-migratory gray whales in the Strait; from a conservation standpoint, this is vital for the whales' ability to meet potential new mates, form new bonds, and ultimately create new bloodlines. This yearly influx of whales is best observed between March and May, at the peak of the migration times.

== See also ==
- Graveyard of the Pacific
- Juan de Fuca Canyon
- List of areas disputed by the United States and Canada
- Marilyn Bell
- Oregon boundary dispute
- Race Rocks Marine Protected Area
- Pig War (San Juan Islands Dispute)
- Swinomish Channel
- Strait of Juan de Fuca laser incident
