= Monika Agnieszka Kusiak =

Prof. Dr. Hab. Eng. Monika Agnieszka Kusiak
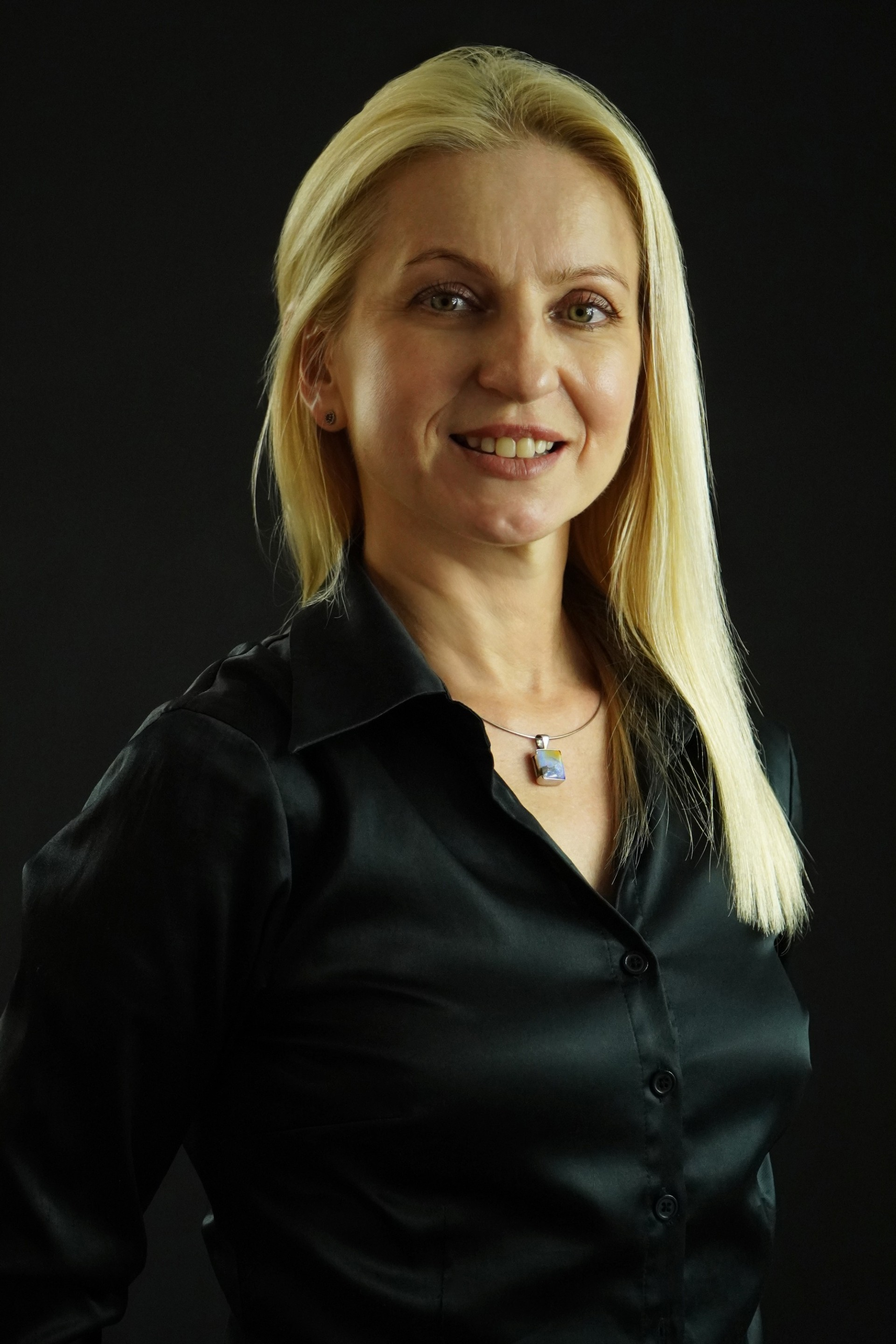
- Born: 23 August 1971; Gubin, Poland
- Education: Jagiellonian University
- Spouse: Wojciech Kusiak
- Scientific career
- Fields: Isotope geochemistry, geology
- Workplaces: Institute of Geophysics of the Polish Academy of Sciences

Monika Agnieszka Kusiak (born 23 August 1971) is a Polish geochemist and polar explorer. She is full professor at the Institute of Geophysics of the Polish Academy of Sciences.

== Early life, education and professional career ==
Kusiak was born on 23 August 1971 in Gubin. In 1991, she graduated from the State Secondary Music School in Kraków, majoring in flute. In 1995, she completed a one-year Management and Business Studies program at the Jagiellonian University in Kraków. In 1996, she graduated in geology from the Faculty of Biology and Earth Sciences at the Jagiellonian University, based on her master's thesis entitled "Provenance of accessory minerals from the Upper Silesian Coal Basin," supervised by Prof. Marek Michalik. In 2003, she obtained a PhD based on her dissertation entitled "Age and geochemistry of detrital monazites from the Upper Carboniferous sediments of the Upper Silesia Coal Basin," supervised by Prof. Nonna Bakun-Czubarow. Her doctoral dissertation was awarded by the Scientific Council of the Institute of Geophysics of the Polish Academy of Sciences. In 2010, she earned her postdoctoral degree (habilitation) for her work titled "Zircon and monazite as micro-recorders of geological processes." In 2021, she received a Master of Science in Engineering degree from the Faculty of Agriculture and Biology at the Warsaw University of Life Sciences, based on her thesis "The effect of drought and salinity stress on the content of assimilation pigments in selected Australian plants," supervised by Prof. Hazem Kalaji. In 2021, she was awarded the title of Professor of Earth Sciences.

She holds positions within the structures of the Polish Academy of Sciences as well as in international university and association bodies. From 2008 to 2018, she was a member of the Scientific Council of the Institute of Geophysics of the Polish Academy of Sciences, and since 2021 she has been a member of the Scientific Council of the Institute of Geophysics of the Polish Academy of Sciences. From 2010 to 2011, she was Deputy Head of the Warsaw Research Center of the Institute of Geological Sciences PAS, and since 2023, a member of the Doctoral Committee of IGF PAS. From 2012 to 2017, she served as secretary of the international IGCP-SIDA 599 project "The Changing Early Earth". Since 2024, she has been a member of the International Advisory Board of Nagoya University in Japan. In preparation for the International Polar Year 2032/33, she serves as a member of the International Arctic Science Committee (ICARP) and as the Polish representative in the international Antarctic project Antarctica InSYNC. She is an editor of the scientific journal published by Elsevier, Precambrian Research. From 2020 to 2023, she served as secretary of the Committee of Mineralogical Sciences of the PAS. Since 2024, she has been a member of the Committee of Geological Sciences of the PAS, and since 2025, secretary of the European Association of Geochemistry (EAG).

== Fieldwork and research ==
She has participated in twelve polar expeditions. Some of these she organized and was the leader. These included expeditions to King George Island in the South Shetland Islands in West Antarctica (2011); to Labrador (2014, 2017, 2023 – twice) to Greenland (2019, 2022 – twice, 2023); to Spitsbergen (2020, 2024). She also participated in an expedition to the Polish Antarctic Station named after A. B. Dobrowolski Polar Station in East Antarctica (2021–2022). The purpose of the expedition was to reactivate and revitalize the station after 42 years of absence of Poles in this part of Antarctica. She is the first and so far the only Polish woman to have been to the A. B. Dobrowolski Polar Station.

She has also conducted scientific exploration in: the Yilgarn Craton (Australia), the Higo Metamorphic Complex (Japan), Bengaluru (India), the Rocky Mountains (Canada), gold, cobalt, copper, and iron deposits on Hainan Island (China), coal mines in Trabzon (Turkey), the Bohemian Massif (Czech Republic), and the Upper Silesian Coal Basin (Poland).

She conducts research and collaborates with scientific institutions in countries including Japan, South Korea, China, Australia, the United States, Canada, the United Kingdom, Sweden, Germany, and France.

== Major scientific achievements ==
- Discovery of radiogenic lead nanospheres in zircon and explanation of the issue of 'reverse discordance' in U-Pb geochronology
- Identification of new regions containing some of the oldest rocks on Earth and differentiation of geochemical types of early Archean rocks in the Napier Complex in Enderby Land, East Antarctica
- Geological research in the Saglek Block on Labrador in Canada and reconstruction of fragments of the geological structure of this area
- Research on the multi-stage development of the archaic crust of the Dharwar Craton in India
- Studies on zircons from lunar samples of the Apollo mission. – Research on Martian meteorites

== Personal life ==
Her husband is Polish Radio journalist Wojciech Kusiak. They have a daughter, Konstancja, and a son, Bertrand.

== Selected publications ==
=== Articles ===
- Kusiak, M.A., Wirth, R. Wilde, S.A., Pidgeon, R.T., 2023. Metallic lead (Pb) nanospheres discovered in Hadean and Eoarchean zircon crystals at Jack Hills
- Kusiak, M.A., Kovaleva, E., Vanderliek, D., Becker, H., Wilke, F., Schreiber, A., Wirth, R. 2022. Nano- and microstructures in lunar zircon from Apollo 15 and 16 impactites: implications for age interpretations
- Kusiak, M.A., Dunkley, D.J., Wirth, R., Whitehouse, M.J., Wilde, S.A., Marquardt, K., 2015. Metallic lead nanospheres discovered in ancient zircons;
- Kusiak, M.A., Williams, I.S., Dunkley, D.J., Konečny, P., Słaby, E. & Martin, H. M. 2014. Monazite to the rescue: U-Th-Pb dating of the intrusive history of the composite Karkonosze pluton, Bohemian Massif;

=== Books ===
- Harley, S.L., Kelly, N.M., Kusiak, M.A., 2019. Ancient Antarctica: The Archean of the East Antarctic Shield, Chapter 35. In: Van Kranendonk, M.J., Bennett, V.C., Hoffmann, J.E. (Eds.), Earth's Oldest Rocks (Second Edition). Elsevier, pp. 865–897. ISBN 9780444639011
- Kusiak, M.A., Wilde, S., Wirth, R., Whitehouse, M., Dunkley, D.J., Lyon, I., Reddy S., Berry A., de Jonge, M. 2017. Detecting micro- and nano-scale variations in element mobility in high-grade metamorphic rocks: implication for precise U-Pb dating of zircon. Editors: D. Moser, J. Darling, S. Reddy, F. Corfu, K. Tait; In: AGU-Wiley monograph 232 "Microstructural Geochronology; Lattice to Atom-Scale Records of Planetary Evolution"; chapter 13: 279–291. ISBN 978-1-119-22724-3; doi:10.1002/978119227250
