= Margaret McIntyre =

Australian politician (1886–1948)

Margaret McIntyre OBE
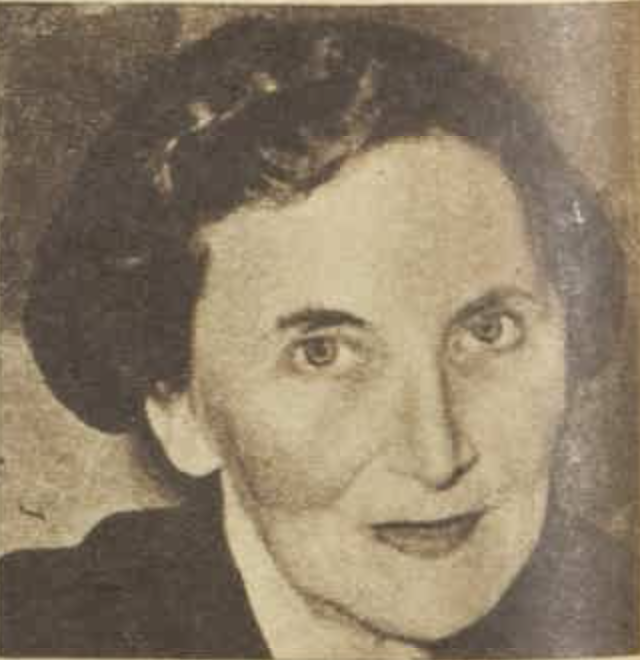
- McIntyre in 1948

Member of the Tasmanian Legislative Council for Cornwall
- In office 8 May 1948 – 2 September 1948
- Preceded by: William Robinson
- Succeeded by: Ernest Record

Personal details
- Born: Margaret Edgeworth David; 28 November 1886 Maitland, New South Wales
- Died: 2 September 1948 (aged 61) near Quirindi, New South Wales
- Cause of death: Aeroplane crash
- Spouse: William Keverall McIntyre
- Relations: Michael E. McIntyre (grandson)
- Children: 4, including Anne
- Parents: Edgeworth David (father); Cara David (mother)
- Education: University of Sydney

Margaret Edgeworth David McIntyre, OBE (28 November 1886 – 2 September 1948) was the first woman elected to the Parliament of Tasmania, representing the seat of Cornwall in the Legislative Council.

== Life and career ==
McIntyre was born in Maitland, New South Wales. Her parents, Sir Tannatt Edgeworth David, a renowned geologist and Antarctic explorer, and Caroline Martha David, a teacher, had moved to Australia in 1882. She was encouraged to become educated and studied for a Bachelor of Arts at the University of Sydney, graduating in 1907.

She married Dr. William Keverall McIntyre at St John's Ashfield in 1908, and they moved to Tasmania, where he set up medical practice. The couple had four children, including poet Anne Godfrey-Smith.

McIntyre was widely involved in the community, and for these services she was appointed an OBE in 1948. Her activities included serving as the State Commissioner for Girl Guides from 1940 to 1948, she was awarded the Silver Fish Award, the movement's highest adult award, in 1947. She served on the board of the Queen Victoria Hospital and the ABC advisory committee. She was the vice-president of the Young Women's Christian Association (YWCA). She was also involved in the establishment of the Brooks Community School in Launceston and founded and directed the Launceston Players for 22 years.

In 1948 she was elected as an independent candidate for the seat of Cornwall, becoming the first woman in the Tasmanian Legislative Council. Six months after her election, while returning from a National Council of Women of Australia Conference in Brisbane, she was killed in the crash of the Lutana near Quirindi on 2 September 1948. She was aged 61.

Tasmanian Legislative Council
Preceded by William Robinson	Member for Cornwall; 1948	Succeeded by Ernest Record
