= A. B. Dobrowolski Polar Station =

Dobrowolski Station
- Antarctic base
- A. B. Dobrowolski
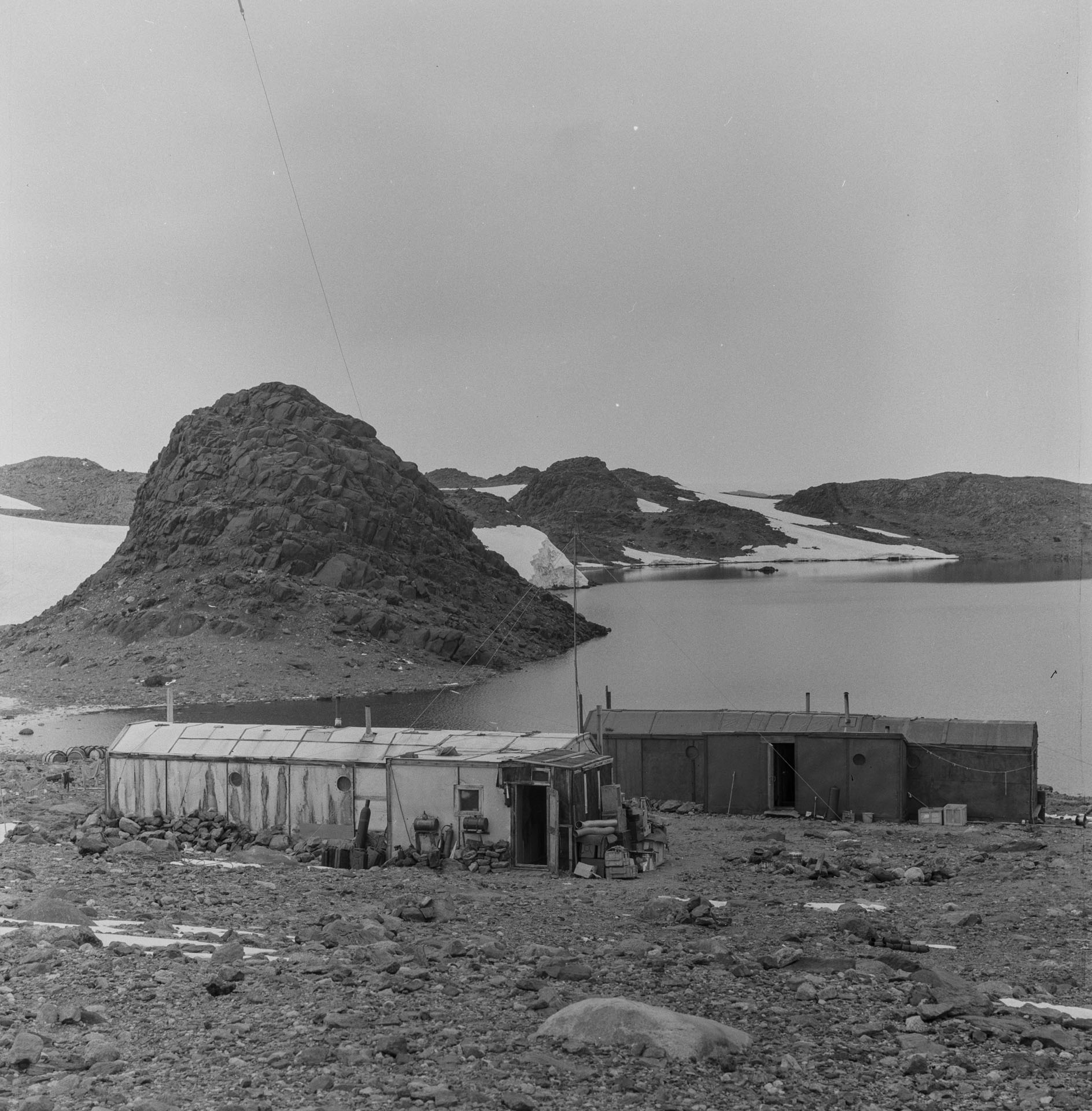
- Buildings of the Dobrowolski Station (Bunger Hills, Antarctica) in 1979 (Photo: Zbigniew Battke).

- Location of Dobrowolski Station in Antarctica
- Coordinates: 66°16′28″S 100°45′00″E
- Country: Poland
- Location in Antarctica: Algae Lake; Bunger Hills; Wilkes Land
- Administered by: Institute of Geophysics, Polish Academy of Sciences
- Established: 1959
- Active: Yes
- Named for: Antoni Bolesław Dobrowolski
- Elevation: 29 m (95 ft)

Population (2017)
  - Summer: 10
  - Winter: 0

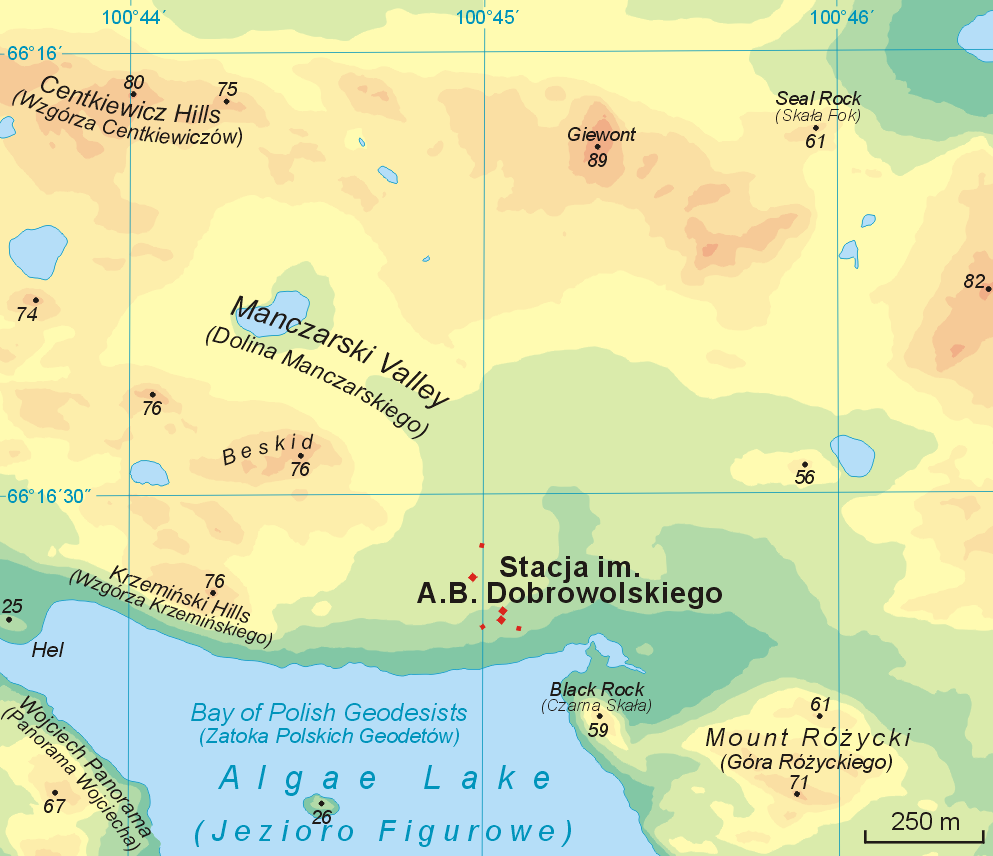
Station location on a map

A.B. Dobrowolski Polar Station (Polish: Stacja im. A.B. Dobrowolskiego) is an occasionally active Polish polar research station in Antarctica. It is located at the edge of the Algae Lake, Bunger Hills region in the Wilkes Land and was originally constructed by the Soviet Union. It is one of the two Polish stations in Antarctica, the other being the Henryk Arctowski Polish Antarctic Station.

The station is named after Polish geophysicist, meteorologist and explorer Antoni Bolesław Dobrowolski.

In January 2022, it was reported that Polish scientists have arrived to staff the station for the first time in 43 years.

== Oasis Station ==
The research station was built by the Soviet Antarctic Expedition in 1956 and named Oazis (Оазис, English: Oasis). The station was handed over by the Soviet Academy of Sciences to the Polish Academy of Sciences in January 1959 and given its current name. It was manned briefly by the Polish expedition, which carried out a number of studies, primarily in the fields of gravimetry and geomorphology. The station has not been used regularly since, due to the lack of funds and the high costs of air transport, and there are no plans to reopen the station as a permanent institution. The station has been visited periodically by Polish and other research teams. The last regular Polish team was reported to have visited the station in 1979. A 1998 Polish statistical yearbook described the base as "periodically active". Thereafter, the station was officially described as "inactive and conserved, but not abandoned", and was only occasionally visited by tourists, such as those who documented their visit in 2010, until its official reactivation in 2022. The 2022 expedition is tasked with preparing a detailed inventory of the station and installing some new research equipment, both necessary in order to return the station to regular seasonal activity.

=== Historic monuments ===
The magnetic observatory building, along with a plaque commemorating the establishment of Oasis Station in 1956, has been designated a Historic Site or Monument (HSM 10) following a proposal by Russia to the Antarctic Treaty Consultative Meeting (ATCM). The concrete pillar erected by the Polish expedition to measure acceleration due to gravity has similarly been designated a Historic Site or Monument (HSM 49) following a proposal by Poland to the ATCM.

== See also ==
- Henryk Arctowski Polish Antarctic Station
- List of Antarctic research stations
- List of Antarctic field camps
