= Cara David =

Australian educator, feminist, and social reformer

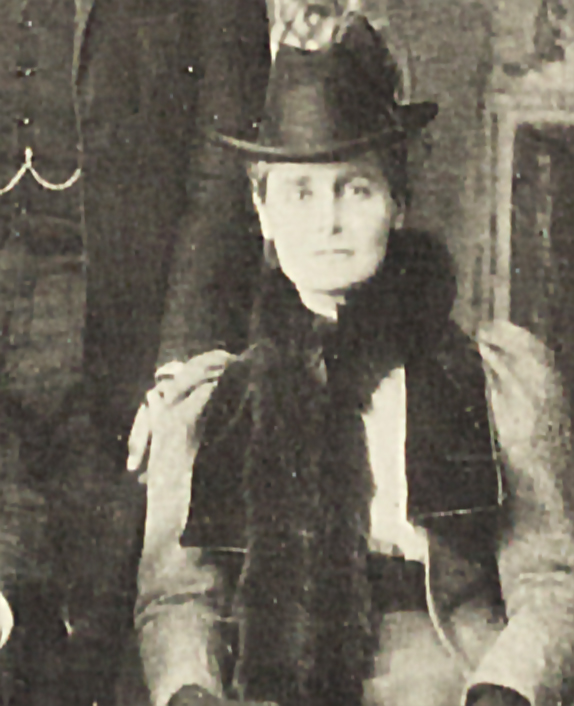
- Caroline Edgeworth David, 1899
- Born: Caroline Martha Mallet; 26 April 1856
- Died: 25 December 1951 (aged 95)
- Other names: Caroline Edgeworth David; Caroline Martha (Cara) David; Caroline Martha David; Lady Caroline Edgeworth David; Mrs. Edgeworth David; Caroline Martha Mallett
- Spouse: Sir Tannatt Edgeworth David
- Children: 3, including Molly and Madge

Cara, Lady David (26 April 1856 – 25 December 1951) was an Australian educator, feminist, and social reformer.

== Biography ==
Born Caroline Martha Mallet in 1856, David was the daughter of a fisherman in Southwold, England. Her parents were Samuel Mallett and Pamela née Wright. Her father died in 1860 and her mother soon afterwards. As a result, David was raised by her grandparents who were a schoolmaster and his wife.

She attended the local school and became a student-teacher there when she was 13. In 1875, David went away to the Whitelands College in London and remained there as a lecturer when she completed her studies.

When she was 29 years old, David moved to Australia to take up the position of principal in the Hurlstone Training College for Women in Sydney. On the boat out she met the man who later became her husband, Tannatt Edgeworth David. However David remained the principal of Hurlstone until 1885. In July 1885, David married. Her husband was a geologist and as a result she travelled around with him. They had three children while living in Maitland, New South Wales. The first was born while they were living in a tent. After the third child was born 1891 the family returned to Sydney. David became the examiner for Sydney Technical College and was part of the hiring team for teaching diplomas in the University of Sydney from 1895 to 1897.

David was inquisitive and investigated several religions including the Methodist, Christadelphian, Quaker, Seventh-Day Adventist, Unitarian, and Baptist sects. She also travelled with her husband to Mount Kosciuszko, in Australia, to England and to Halifax, Canada. One of the most notable of her trips was to Tuvalu, then known as Funafuti, in 1897.

David was the only woman on the expedition. Despite her intended role of nursemaid, cook and wife, David immersed herself in the local culture and in 1899 published a book, Funafuti, or, Three months on a coral island, about her experiences (digitised version).

She regularly took actions which were seen as daring or shocking. She wore a divided skirt on Kosciusko. She swam naked with her husband in Tuvalu. Intensely interested in social reform and education David was a member of the National Council of Women. She was an active suffragist. Her professional standing gave her influence in the Department of Public Instruction of New South Wales. David was a founding member of the Women's club in the University of Sydney where she was elected vice-president. Dubbed "one of the few really brainy women [in] Sydney", she was elected president of Sydney Women's Club in 1906. and was a founding member of the Feminist Club in 1914. David founded the Women's National Movement, as its first president in June 1916. In later life David became the state commissioner of Girl Guides in New South Wales, retiring at 82 from a role she took on for the previous ten years.

David is believed to have convinced her husband not to accept a knighthood until eventually his work pressured him into it in 1920. He died in 1934. David lived after that with her daughter Molly in Hornsby. Madge, her eldest, became the first woman elected to the Tasmanian Parliament. David died on 25 December 1951.

== Personal life ==
David was a vegetarian. For her health regime she used dumbbells.
