= Bunger Hills =

Oasis in Antarctica

Location of Bunger Hills
Antarctica

Bunger Hills, also known as Bunger Lakes or Bunger Oasis, is a coastal range on the Knox Coast in Wilkes Land in Antarctica, consisting of a group of moderately low, rounded coastal hills, overlain by morainic drift and notably ice free throughout the year, lying south of the Highjump Archipelago. The reasoning behind the minute amount of ice in the area is still relatively unknown and remains under intense debate amongst scientists today.

The Bunger Hills are located with its center at 66°17′S 100°47′E, stretching from 65°58'S to 66°20'S and from 100°20'E to 101°28'E. The Bunger Hills are marked by numerous melt ponds and are nearly bisected by an east-west trending Algae Lake (also known as Lake Figurnoye). Mapped from air photos taken by the United States Navy Operation Highjump (1946-1947) and named by the United States Advisory Committee on Antarctic Names (US-ACAN) for Lieutenant Commander David E. Bunger, United States Navy, plane commander of one of the three USN OpHjp aircraft which engaged in photographic missions along most of the coastal area between 14 E and 164 E. David E. Bunger and members of his crew landed their airplane on an unfrozen lake here in February 1947.

The Bunger Hills are surrounded by glaciers. On the southeast the Bunger Hills is bordered by the steep slopes of the Antarctic ice sheet, on the south and west by outlet glaciers, and on the north by Shackleton Ice Shelf, which separates the area from the open sea. The ice-free area measures 450 km^{2} (174 sq mi), according to some sources even 750 or 942 km^{2} (290 or 364 sq mi) (though these latter values include a marine area not covered by continental ice or the Shackleton Ice Shelf). The topography is characterized by rugged hills, and there are many freshwater and salt lakes. The largest and deepest lake, Algae Lake (Lake Figurnoye) is 25 km (16 mi) long and up to 137 metres (449 ft) deep. The leader of Operation Highjump, Admiral Richard E. Byrd stated that the Bunger Hills was ‘…one of the most remarkable regions on earth. An island suitable for life had been found in a universe of death.’

Cape Hordern is an ice-free cape, overlain by morainic drift, at the western end of the Bunger Hills. It was first observed by members of the western party of the Australian Antarctic Expedition (1911-1914), who were unable to reach it due to heavy crevassing on the Denman and Scott Glaciers.

== Stations ==
The Soviet Union built a scientific station by the name of Oazis (Оазис) in the center of the area at 66°16′29″S 100°44′49″E, starting October 15, 1956, with two buildings for eight people. The station was handed over to Poland on January 23, 1959, and was renamed A. B. Dobrowolski Station (named after Antoni Dobrowolski). It continued to be occupied for a few weeks only thereafter. On February 22, 1979 (with preparations starting February 18) the station was reactivated for a short time, but an overwintering attempt failed, and the occupants had to be evacuated to Mirny Station (350 km or 220 mi to the west) on March 17.

The concrete pillar erected by the First Polish Antarctic Expedition at Dobrowolski Station in January 1959 for gravity measurements, and the magnetic observatory at the station with plaque in memory of the opening of Oazis Station in 1956, are recognized as Antarctic Historic Sites.

Oazis 2 Оазис 2
- Antarctic research station
- Interactive map of Oazis 2
- Coordinates: 66°16′27″S 100°44′39″E
- Established: 1987
- Closed: 1995
- Named after: Bunger Oasis

Government
  - Type: Administration
  - Body: Russian Antarctic Expedition
- Active times: Every summer

The Soviet Union became interested in the Bunger Hills again in the late 1980s, and built the Oazis 2 station a few hundred metres to the west of Dobrowolski. The station was used for summer visits up to the mid-1990s.

About 7 kilometres (4.3 mi) west-northwest of Dobrowolski, at 66°15′S 100°36′E, Australia has maintained the summer-only station Edgeworth David Base, named after Edgeworth David, since 1986.

== See also ==
- Countess Peninsula
- Mill Island
