= Australian Mining Corps =

Australian specialist military mining unit

The Australian Mining Corps was a specialist military mining unit of the Royal Australian Engineers during World War I.

== History ==
On 10 September 1915, the British government sent a formal appeal to Canada, South Africa, Australia and New Zealand to raise tunnelling companies in the Dominions of the British Empire. In August 1915, the Australian geologist and Antarctic explorer Edgeworth David, after reading reports about mining operations and tunnelling during the Gallipoli Campaign, along with Professor Ernest Skeats, a professor at the University of Melbourne, had already written a proposal to George Pearce, the Australian Defence Minister, suggesting that the government raise a military force to undertake mining and tunnelling. After the proposal was accepted, David used his advocacy and organisational abilities to set up the Australian Mining Corps, and on 25 October 1915 he was appointed as a major, at the age of 57. The first contingent of the corps consisted of 1,300 officers and men that were initially organised into two battalions before being reorganised into the units listed below:

- 1st Australian Tunnelling Company
- 2nd Australian Tunnelling Company
- 3rd Australian Tunnelling Company
- Australian Electrical Mechanical Boring and Mining Company

The first three of these units were tunnelling companies, while the Electrical Mechanical Boring and Mining Company was tasked with carrying out related repairs. The four mining units formed by the Royal Australian Engineers for the British Expeditionary Force departed Australia for the United Kingdom in February 1916, became fully operational by March 1916, and arrived on the Western Front in May 1916. After May 1916, the four constituent companies of the Australian Mining Corps were deployed directly as part of the tunnelling companies of the Royal Engineers.
