= Edgeworth David Base =

Edgeworth David Camp
- Antarctic base
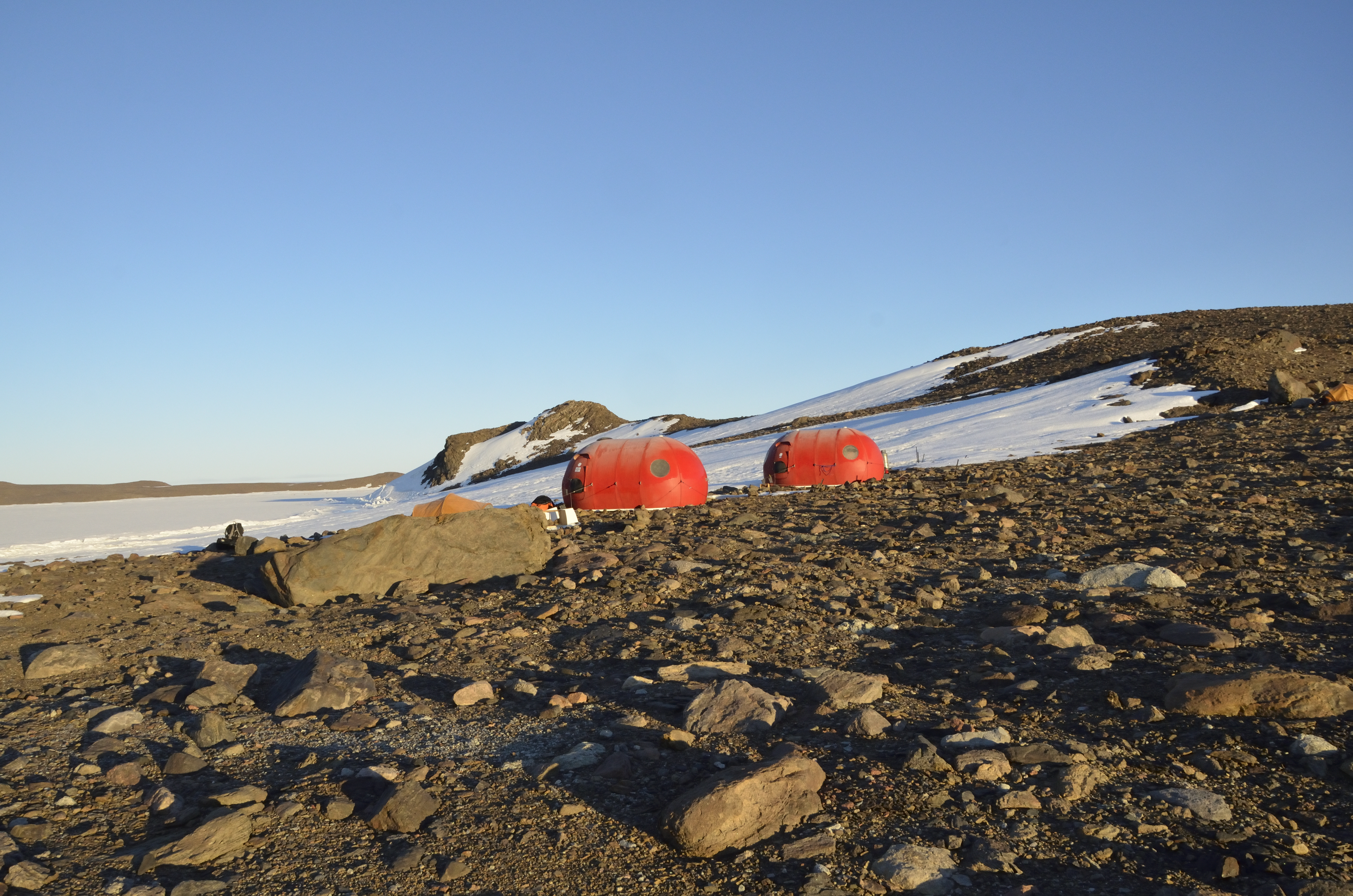
- Edgeworth Davis Base in Bunger Hills, seen from south-east

- Location of Edgeworth David Camp in Antarctica
- Coordinates: 66°14′59″S 100°36′12″E
- Country: Australia
- Location in Antarctica: Bunger Hills; Antarctica
- Administered by: Australian Antarctic Division
- Established: 1986

Population
  - Total: Up to 8
- Type: Seasonal
- Period: Summer
- Status: Operational
- Website: aad.gov.au

Edgeworth David Base is a refuge and research outpost named after Sir Edgeworth David, located in Northern Bunger Hills. It was opened in 1986 by the Australian Antarctic Division. It is temporary visited during the summer season and used for geological, geophysical, geomorphological and biological research.

== See also ==
- List of Antarctic research stations
- List of Antarctic field camps
