= Iceberg Point =

Point on Anvers Island, Palmer Archipelago, Antarctica

Coordinates: 64°38′S 63°6′W

Iceberg Point is a prominent point 8 miles (13 km) west-southwest of Ryswyck Point, on the east side of Anvers Island, in the Palmer Archipelago, Antarctica. The point was first mapped by the Belgian Antarctic Expedition, 1897–99. The name appears on a chart based upon a 1927 survey by Discovery Investigations personnel on the Discovery, but may reflect an earlier naming.

== Maps ==
- Antarctic Digital Database (ADD). Scale 1:250000 topographic map of Antarctica. Scientific Committee on Antarctic Research (SCAR). Since 1993, regularly upgraded and updated.
- British Antarctic Territory. Scale 1:200000 topographic map. DOS 610 Series, Sheet W 64 62. Directorate of Overseas Surveys, Tolworth, UK, 1980.
- Brabant Island to Argentine Islands. Scale 1:250000 topographic map. British Antarctic Survey, 2008.
