= Mill Island =

Island in Queen Mary Land, Antarctica

- Location within Antarctica

Geography
- Location: Antarctica
- Coordinates: 65°30′S 100°40′E
- Area: 1,260 km^{2} (490 sq mi)
- Length: 46 km (28.6 mi)
- Width: 30 km (19 mi)

Administration
- Administered under the Antarctic Treaty System

Demographics
- Population: Uninhabited

Mill Island is an ice-domed island, 46 kilometres (25 nmi) long and 30 kilometres (16 nmi) wide, lying 46 kilometres (25 nmi) north of the Bunger Hills. Mill Island was discovered in February 1936 by personnel on the William Scoresby, and named for British geographer and meteorologist Hugh Robert Mill. It is currently uninhabitable.

== See also ==
- Composite Antarctic Gazetteer
- List of Antarctic and sub-Antarctic islands
- List of Antarctic islands south of 60° S
- SCAR
- Territorial claims in Antarctica
