= Dobrowolski Island =

Island in Palmer Archipelago, Antarctica

Dobrowolski Island (64°36′S 62°55′W) is a small island which lies close to the east coast of Anvers Island, 3 nautical miles (6 km) southwest of Ryswyck Point, in the Palmer Archipelago. It was charted in 1927 by Discovery Investigations personnel on the Discovery, who gave the name "Astrolabe Island". To avoid duplication, the name was changed in 1958 by the UK Antarctic Place-Names Committee, and the island is now named after Antoni B. Dobrowolski, assistant meteorologist of the Belgian Antarctic Expedition which explored this area in 1898.

== See also ==
- Gerlache Strait Geology
- List of Antarctic and sub-Antarctic islands
