= Dobrovolsky =

Dobrovolsky, sometimes spelled Dobrovolskiy or Dobrovolski (Russian: Добровольский), or Dobrovolskaya (feminine; Добровольская), is a Russian surname. Notable people with the surname include:

- Alexey Dobrovolsky (1938–2013), Soviet-Russian dissident, co-founder of Russian Rodnoverie, and neo-Nazi
- Anatoly Dobrovolsky (1910–1988), Ukrainian/Soviet architect
- Galina Dobrovolskaya, head of Leningrad State Institute of Theatre, Music, and Cinema for some time
- Georgy Dobrovolsky (1928–1971), Soviet cosmonaut and Hero of the Soviet Union
- Igor Dobrovolski (born 1967), Soviet/Russian football player
- Mikhail Dolivo-Dobrovolsky (1861–1919), Russian engineer, electrician, and inventor
- Oleg Vasilyevich Dobrovolsky, Soviet astronomer, namesake of asteroid 3013 Dobrovoleva
- Viktor Dobrovolsky (1906–?), Ukrainian/Soviet actor and People's Artist of the USSR
- Vladimir Dobrovolsky (1834–1877), Russian military officer
- Vladimir Dobrovolsky (writer), co-writer of 1937 Soviet adventure film The Rich Bride
- Yana Dobrovolskaya (born 1997), Miss Russia 2016
- Yevgenia Dobrovolskaya (1964–2025), Soviet and Russian actress
- Yuri Dobrovolsky (1911–1979), Soviet aircraft pilot and Hero of the Soviet Union

== See also ==
- Dobrowolski, Polish surname
