= Countess Peninsula =

Peninsula in Antarctica

Countess Peninsula (66°9′S 101°14′E) is a rocky peninsula, 1.5 nautical miles (3 km) long and 0.5 nautical miles (1 km) wide, which projects west from the coast between Booth Peninsula and the base of the Bunger Hills. It was mapped from aerial photographs taken by U.S. Navy Operation Highjump, 1946–47, and named by the Advisory Committee on Antarctic Names for Julian Countess, air crewman on the Operation Highjump seaplane commanded by D.E. Bunger which obtained aerial and ground photographs of this ice-free area.
