= Algae Lake =

Body of water in Queen Mary Land, Antarctica

- Location within Antarctica
- Location: Bunger Hills, Antarctica
- Coordinates: 66°18′S 100°48′E
- Max. length: 9 nautical miles (17 km)
- Max. width: 1 nautical mile (1.9 km)

Algae Lake is a narrow, winding lake, 9 nautical miles (17 km) long and between 0.2 and 1 nautical mile (0.4 and 1.9 km) wide, extending in an east–west direction in the ice-free Bunger Hills of Antarctica. It was first mapped from air photos taken by U.S. Navy Operation Highjump, 1946–47, and named "Algae Inlet" by the Advisory Committee on Antarctic Names because of the algae reported by Operation Highjump personnel, which cause varying tints to the meltwater ponds overlying the Bunger Hills and to the saline inlets and channels in the Highjump Archipelago area close to the north. Subsequent Soviet Antarctic Expeditions (1956–57) found this "inlet" to be a lake.
