= Antoni Bolesław Dobrowolski =

Polish geophysicist (1872–1954)

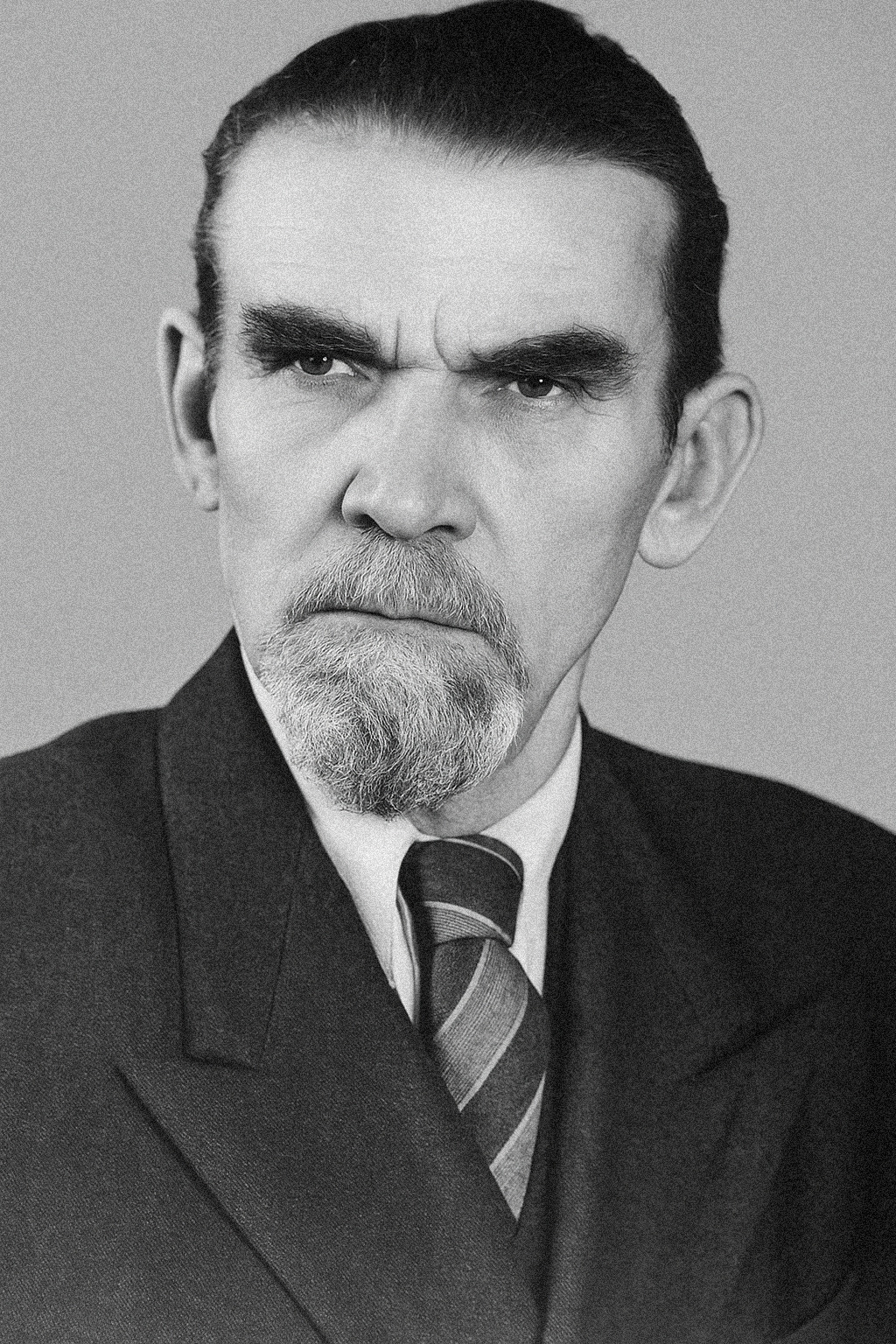
- Born: June 6, 1872; Dworszowice Kościelne, Congress Poland, Russian Empire
- Died: April 27, 1954 (aged 81); Warsaw, Polish People's Republic
- Resting place: Powązki Cemetery, Warsaw
- Education: University of Liège, Belgium
- Known for: participation in the Belgian Antarctic Expedition, studies of the cryosphere
- Scientific career
- Fields: geophysics, meteorology
- Workplaces: Royal Observatory of Belgium, Polish Meteorological Institute (Warsaw)

Antoni Bolesław Dobrowolski (6 June 1872 – 27 April 1954) was a Polish geophysicist, meteorologist and explorer.

== Early life ==
Dobrowolski was born into an indigent family in Dworszowice Kościelne, and supported himself from the age of 12 by teaching younger students while a high school student in Warsaw. His involvement in seeking Polish independence led to a conviction to three years imprisonment in the Caucasus, but after two years he escaped and started studying in Switzerland and Belgium.

== Belgian Antarctic Expedition ==
While still a student in biology, physics and chemistry at the University of Liège he took part in the Belgian Antarctic Expedition (1897-1899) as assistant meteorologist. Henryk Arctowski, who was in charge of physical observations, was initially unsuccessfully in convincing expedition commander Adrien de Gerlache to take him on, but when the Belgica had to return to Ostend for repairs and the ship's doctor and a sailor quit, he was contracted as a sailor.

However, his substantial scientific contributions prompted de Gerlache to formally promote him in March 1898. Arctowski and Dobrowolski were the first to conduct year-round meteorological and hydrographical observations off Antarctica. In addition he studied ice crystallography and light phenomena in ice clouds. These data enabled him to write a monumental treatise on the crystallography of ice and snow.

After his return from the Antarctic he obtained a scholarship in Belgium to study his results and collaborated with Georges Lecointe at the Royal Observatory of Belgium.

== Later career ==
In 1907 Nicholas II of Russia declared amnesty for political refugees, enabling Dobrowolski to return to Warsaw. Until 1914, he worked as a schoolteacher. During the First World War he lived in Sweden, where he studied ice and snow formation. After the war he returned to Poland, where he finished his treatise on the crystallography of ice and snow, Natural History of Ice (Historia naturalna lodu). The concept of the cryosphere can be traced back to this monogram. He also published works on pedagogy and research ethics, while teaching pedagogy at the Polish Free University in Warsaw, and was deeply involved in the organization of education in newly independent Poland. In 1924 he was appointed deputy director, and later director, of the Polish Meteorological Institute in Warsaw.

He founded several observatories and the Society of Geophysicists in Warsaw, and actively promoted polar research in Poland. During the second Polar Year (1932-1933) he provided practical help and advice to the Polish expedition that overwintered on Bear Island. He headed the organizing committee of the 1934 Polish expedition to Spitsbergen, and was involved with the 1938 Polish Expedition to Oscar II Land. After the Second World War he pushed for further Polish scientific involvement in Polar research. He died in 1954, without seeing the implementation of his ideas in the Polish participation in the International Geophysical Year. His fellow Polish explorers and scientists regarded him as a "father figure", and he naturally became a center of Polar knowledge. He died in Warsaw, aged 81.

== Tributes ==
An occasionally active Polish research station in the Bunger Hills, Dobrowolski Island, Dobrowolski Peak and Dobrowolski Glacier (both on King George Island) are named after him.

== See also ==
- List of Poles
