= Jan Fryderyk Dobrowolski =

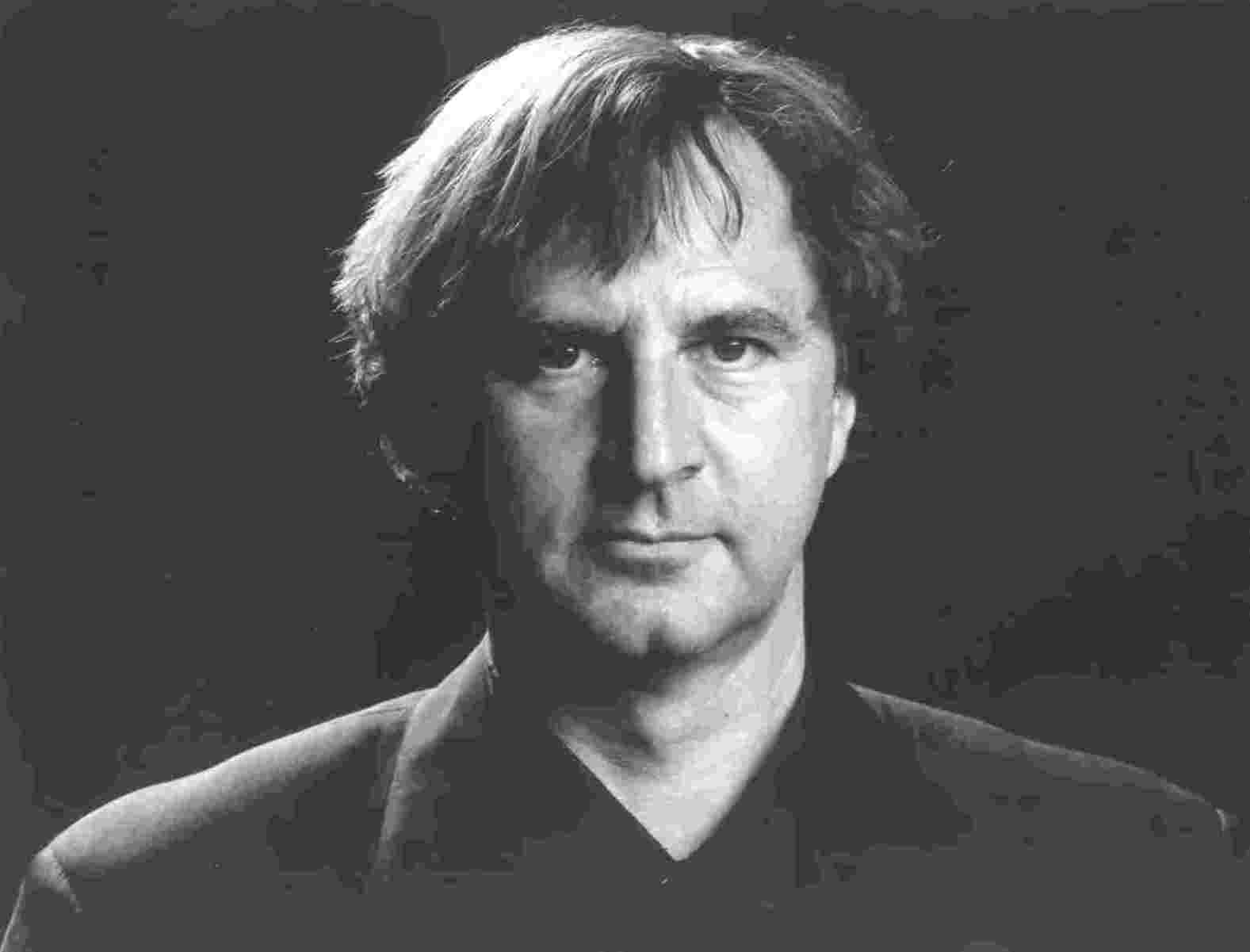

Background information
- Born: July 9, 1944 (age 82)
- Genres: Jazz, instrumental music
- Occupations: Composer, musician
- Instrument: Piano
- Years active: 1972–present

Jan Fryderyk Dobrowolski (born July 9, 1944 in Poland) is a Polish classical and jazz keyboardist and composer.

He won first prizes at the competitions in Kalisz, "Jazz at the Oder" in Wrocław and the "Jeunesse Musical Festival" in Częstochowa. He made himself a name as a Chopin interpret, but then focussed on Jazz and World Music. He appeared at the Montreux Jazz Festival with fellow bassplayer Zbigniew Bednarek (sometimes referenced as Jacek Bednarek) as Jan Fryderyk Dobrowolski Duo in 1972. Extraordinary band settings in live recordings with Charlie Mariano on saxophone and Alberto Alarcon with castanets gained him high reputation among critics and became also a commercial success. He also composed and recorded music related to car driving and is the composer of music representing brands like Citroën and Opel.

== Discography ==
Recordings

- 1972 At The New Jazz Meeting Altena 1972
- 1973 Jan Fryderyk Dobrowolski
- 1983 trio – ˈtriːou
- 1983 Handschrift
- 1987 Autobahn-Musik
- 1992 Two Concerts in Cologne
- 2008 highway-music (9 CD-set)
- 2011 Hedgehogs, Hedgehogs, Hedgehogs (Hipster vinyl)
