= Edgeworth David =

Welsh-Australian geologist (1858–1934)

Sir Edgeworth David KBE CMG DSO FRS
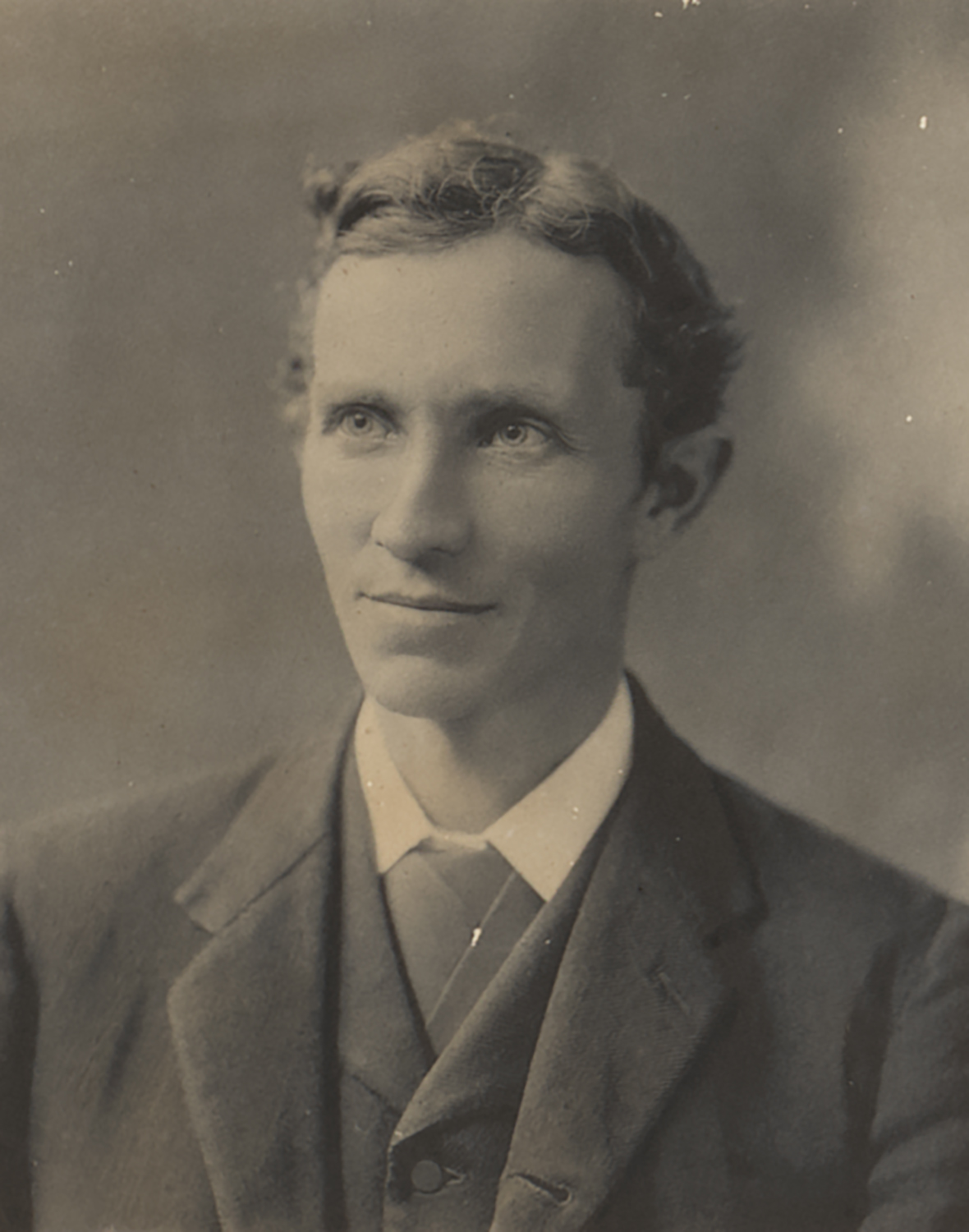
- Tannatt William Edgeworth David, 1898

Personal details
- Born: Tannatt William Edgeworth David; 28 January 1858 St Fagans, Cardiff, Wales
- Died: 28 August 1934 (aged 76) Sydney, New South Wales
- Cause of death: Lobar pneumonia
- Spouse: Caroline (Cara) David
- Children: Margaret McIntyre; Mary Edgeworth David; William Edgeworth David
- Education: New College, Oxford
- Occupation: Geologist, polar explorer
- Known for: First ascent of Mount Erebus; First to South Magnetic Pole
- Civilian awards: Bigsby Medal (1899); Mueller Medal (1909); Wollaston Medal (1915); Clarke Medal (1917); Patron's Medal (1926)

Military service
- Branch: Australian Imperial Force
- Years of service: 1915–1919
- Rank: Lieutenant colonel
- Unit: Australian Mining Corps
- Battles/wars: First World War
- Military awards: Distinguished Service Order; Mentioned in despatches (2)

Sir Tannatt William Edgeworth David, KBE, CMG, DSO, FRS (28 January 1858 – 28 August 1934) was a Welsh Australian geologist, Antarctic explorer, and military veteran. A household name in his lifetime, David's most significant achievements were discovering a major Hunter Valley coalfield in New South Wales, leading the first expedition to reach the south magnetic pole, and serving in the Tunnelling Corps during the war. He was knighted for his role in the First World War.

== Early life and education ==
Tannatt William Edgeworth David was born on 28 January 1858, in St Fagans near Cardiff, Wales.

At the age of 12, David went to Magdalen College School, Oxford, in 1870. In 1876, he gained a classical scholarship to New College, Oxford. While there he was lectured by the famous John Ruskin and William Spooner. In 1878 he suffered a health breakdown and travelled to Canada and Australia to recuperate. Returning to Oxford, he attended lectures on geology by Sir Joseph Prestwich which stimulated his interest in the subject. After graduating as a Bachelor of Arts without honours in 1880, he spent the following two years in field study of the geology of Wales.

In 1882 he briefly studied at the Royal School of Mines, London, under John Wesley Judd.

== Career ==
=== Australia and the Pacific ===
The known coal reserves of the northern coalfields of New South Wales were greatly increased, in 1886, when he discovered the Greta coal seams, the coal resource which allowed a rapid expansion of coal mining on the South Maitland Coalfields.

In 1891, David was appointed professor of geology at the University of Sydney, a position he held until 1924.

From 1900 to 1907 he conducted field studies of glaciation in the Kosciusko plateau and Precambrian glaciation in South Australia.

Douglas Mawson was enrolled for Bachelor of Engineering degree in mining and metallurgy from 1899 until his graduation in 1902, and Edgeworth served not only as an influential mentor to Mawson, but as his referee for his appointment as a junior demonstrator in chemistry during this time. In 1904, Mawson and T. H. Laby were the first to identify radium-bearing ore in Australia, and David made the formal presentation of the paper to the Royal Society of New South Wales on 5 October 1904 on the men's behalf. In 1906 Mawson identified and first described the mineral davidite (named after David), which contains titanium and uranium, at Radium Hill, South Australia.

=== Antarctic exploration ===
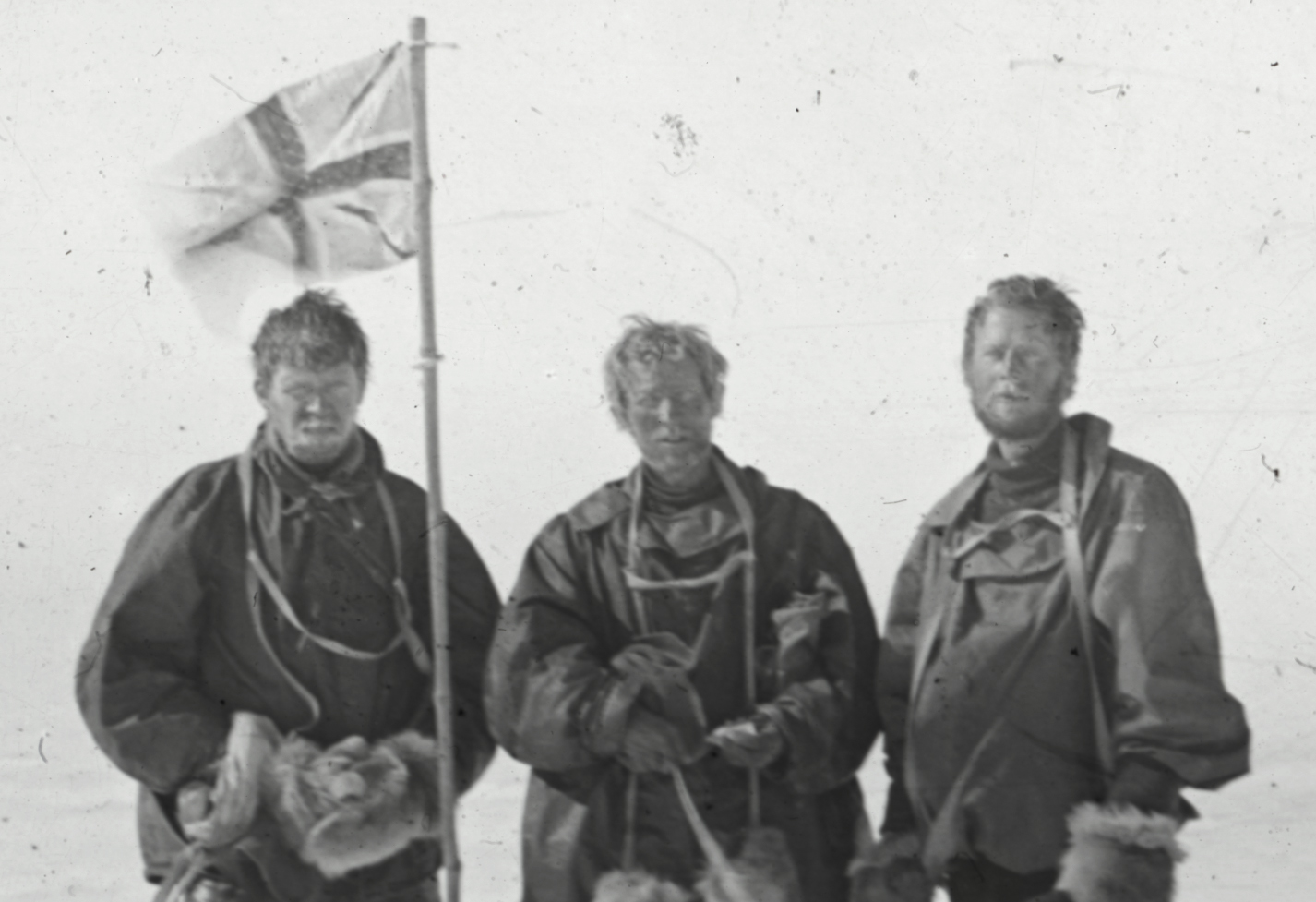
Alistair Mackay, David, and Douglas Mawson at the south magnetic pole on 16 January 1909

In mid-1907, David was invited to join Ernest Shackleton's Antarctic Nimrod Expedition, and, in December, won Australian government funding for the expedition.

On 5 October, David led Mawson and Mackay on an attempt to reach the Magnetic South Pole. For 10 weeks the men followed the coast north supplementing their stores with a diet of seals and penguins. They then crossed the Drygalski Ice Tongue and turned inland. They still faced a 700-kilometre (430 mi) return journey and established a depot to enable them to transfer their load to one overladen sled and to remove the need to relay. On 16 January 1909, they finally arrived at the south magnetic pole and took possession of the region for the British Crown.

David had been appointed leader by Shackleton, but by the end of January, with all three of the party experiencing severe physical deterioration, David was increasingly unable to contribute. On 31 January, Mackay exerted his authority as the party's doctor and threatened to declare the Professor insane unless he gave written authority of leadership to Mawson. Mawson took command, writing in his diary on 3 February: "the Prof was now certainly partly demented". That day the party reached the coast line with perfect timing; within 24 hours they were collected by the Nimrod for the return trip to Cape Royds. The trio had covered a distance of 1,260 miles (2,028 km), which stood as the longest unsupported sled journey until the mid-1980s.

In 1910, David became a Companion of the Order of St Michael and St George, and visiting England in connection with the scientific results of the Antarctic expedition, Oxford University awarded him the honorary degree of Doctor of Science. From 1911 to 1912, he provided public and practical support for the Japanese Antarctic Expedition, which was wintering in Sydney. In 1913, David was elected president of the Australasian Association for the Advancement of Science for the second time and in 1926, was presented with the Royal Geographical Society's Patron's Medal.

== First World War: Australian Mining Corps ==
When the First World War broke out in 1914, David was a strenuous supporter of the war effort, supporting the campaign for conscription. In August 1915, after reading reports about mining operations and tunnelling during the Gallipoli Campaign, along with Professor Ernest Skeats, a professor at the University of Melbourne, David wrote a proposal to Senator George Pearce, the Australian Defence Minister, suggesting that the government raise a military force to undertake mining and tunnelling. After the proposal was accepted, David used his advocacy and organisational abilities to set up the Australian Mining Corps and, on 25 October 1915, he was appointed as a major, at the age of 57.

The first contingent of the corps consisted of 1,300 officers and men that were initially organised into two battalions before being reorganised into three tunnelling companies, as well as an electrical and mechanical mining company. After departing Australia for the United Kingdom in February 1916, the corps arrived on the Western Front in May 1916. Given the title 'Geological Adviser to the Controllers of Mines in the First, Second and Third Armies', David became relatively independent and spent his time in geological investigations, using his expertise to advise on the construction of dugouts, trenches, and tunnels, the siting of wells for provision of pure drinking water from underground supplies, giving lectures, and producing maps. In September 1916 he fell to the bottom of a well he was examining, breaking two ribs and rupturing his urethra. He was invalided to London but returned to the Front in November, assuming the role of geological technical advisor to the British Expeditionary Force.

On 7 June 1917 his wartime contribution culminated in the mining of German positions in the Battle of Messines.

In January 1918, David was awarded the Distinguished Service Order and in November he was promoted to lieutenant colonel. The war having concluded, he was demobilised in 1919. He was also Mentioned in Despatches twice.

== Later life ==
In 1896 the Davids bought 26 acres (10.5 hectares) at Woodford, in the Blue Mountains, with an existing weatherboard cottage, two-roomed with two skillion rooms at the back. To emphasise his Welsh origins, Edgeworth David named the Woodford cottage ‘Tyn-y-Coed’, the 'house in the trees' (often mistranslated as 'the shack in the bush': 'ty' is a proper house in Welsh, not a mere hut).

In 1915 the Davids offered their home to the Red Cross convalescent home for the rehabilitation of injured servicemen and the Woodford Academy boys erected a flagstaff for the Union Jack and Red Cross flags for the soldiers in residence. When the Cooee marchers trooped past in November 1915 some of the wounded soldiers were brought up to the main road to greet the marchers. Although they had work and commitments in Sydney, Woodford was the David's primary residence from 1899 until 1920. They retained the Woodford cottage as a favoured country retreat until Edgeworth's death in 1934. Tyn-y-Coed was destroyed by bushfire in 1944 with only a chimney stump remaining. Its grounds are now occupied by eight modern houses, their gardens and adjoining bush.

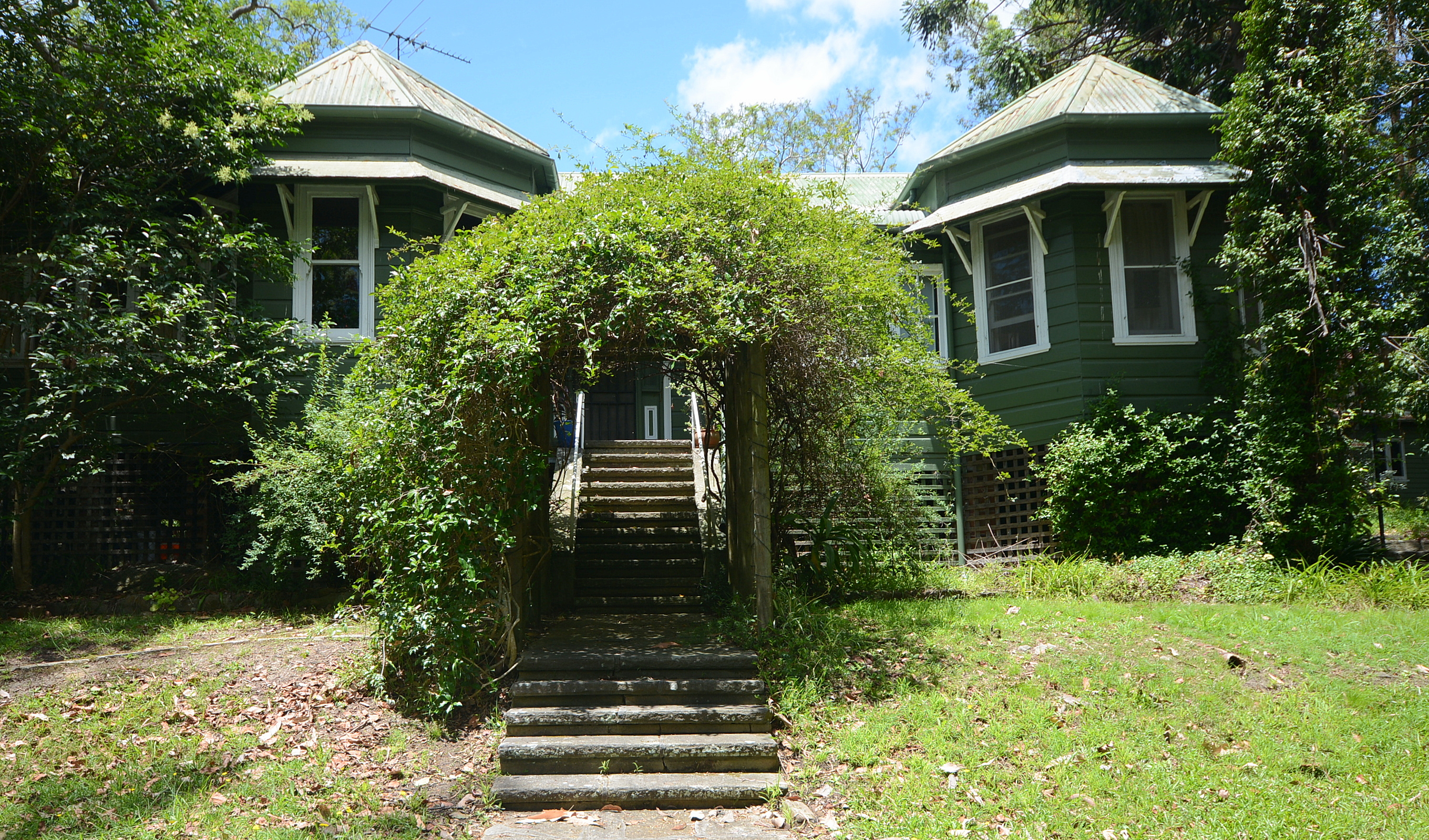
2014 image of Coringah, David's home in Hornsby, Sydney, where he lived from 1920

In September 1920, David was created a Knight Commander of the Order of the British Empire for services during the war.

Returning to Australia, David purchased "Coringah", a cottage in the Sydney suburb of Hornsby. He also started writing a definitive work, The Geology of the Commonwealth of Australia.

In 1921–22 David helped set up the Australian National Research Council and served as its first president. In 1924 he retired as professor of geology at the University of Sydney, the chair passing to his student Leo Cotton, a neighbour in Hornsby, New South Wales, whose brother Max Cotton created Lisgar Gardens in Hornsby.

In 1928 he discovered what he believed were Precambrian fossils, creating controversy which remained until his death.

In 1931 he published the Geological Map of the Commonwealth and the accompanying Explanatory Notes, designed to be part of his Geology of the Commonwealth of Australia. He died in Sydney on 28 August 1934 without being able to complete this work and was given a state funeral.

== Legacy ==
David's The Geology of the Commonwealth of Australia was finally completed by his chosen collaborator, associate professor William R. Browne in 1950.

The Edgeworth David Medal is named in his honour. It is awarded by the Royal Society of New South Wales for distinguished contributions by a young scientist under the age of thirty-five for work done mainly in Australia or its territories. The mineral davidite is named after him, as was the Edgeworth David Building (demolished 2006) at the University of Sydney.

The Edgeworth David Building at Tighes Hill TAFE campus in the New South Wales Hunter Valley is named in his honour.

David Island, lying off Davis Peninsula in the Shackleton Ice Shelf in Antarctica, is named for him.

Edgeworth David Base is the name of a summer station in the Bunger Hills area of Antarctica. It has been maintained by Australia since 1986.

The suburb of Edgeworth in the city of Newcastle, New South Wales, is named after him.

The Edgeworth David quarry in Seaham, New South Wales is named after David, who discovered varve shale there in 1914.

The boreholes on Funafuti, Tuvalu are known as "David's Drill".

In 1968 he was honoured on a postage stamp issued by Australia Post.

David's daughter Margaret McIntyre was the first woman elected to the Parliament of Tasmania and was awarded the Order of the British Empire.

In 1999, the David wooded family estate Coringah, in the Northern Sydney suburb of Hornsby, was added to the New South Wales State Heritage Register, listed as Edgeworth David's House and Grounds. That same year, Hornsby Council acquired Coringah. Since 2016, the Edgeworth David Community Garden is located in the park which is called Edgeworth David Garden.

Edgeworth David Avenue is an east-west road bridging the Hornsby Shire suburbs of Hornsby, Waitara, and Wahroonga. It was named after his death.

Awards
Preceded by William Aitcheson Haswell	Clarke Medal; 1917	Succeeded by Leonard Rodway
