= Valentine S. de Dobrowolski =

British composer (1847–1896)

Valentine Semibreve de Dobrowolski (1847–1896) was a composer, mainly of light music of the Victorian era, including

- Moonlight & Starlight, words by Frederic Weatherly
- Palladino Waltz
- Strand Waltz
- Second to None polka
- Waltzing words by Claxon Bellamy
- The Berwick Polka
- The Shipperies, waltz performed at the International Exhibition of Navigation, Commerce and Industry (1886)

He is buried in the St. Mary's Roman Catholic Cemetery, Kensal Green, London.
