= Ryswyck Point =

Ryswyck Point (64°34′S 62°50′W) is a point marking the east extremity of Anvers Island, in the Palmer Archipelago. It was discovered and named by the Belgian Antarctic Expedition, 1897–99, under de Gerlache.

== See also ==
- Gerlache Strait Geology
- Anvers Island Geology
