= Launceston Players =

Australian theatre company

The Launceston Players Society is an Australian theatre company, believed to have been formed in September 1926 in Launceston Tasmania. The first production, Nothing But the Truth by James Montgomery, was performed in March 1927.

Since that first performance, the Launceston Players have presented a wide variety of musicals, dramas, comedies, Theatre Restaurant, street theatre, play readings and commercials. The Australian Live Performance database lists approximately 170 events related to the organisation.

It is one of the oldest theatre companies in Australia.

The society's records are held at the Queen Victoria Museum & Art Gallery in Launceston.
