= NC class =

NC class may refer to:

- Commonwealth Railways NC class, diesel-hydraulic locomotives
- NZR NC class, 2-6-2 steam locomotives
