= WAGR Pm and Pmr classes =

Class of 19+16 Australian 4-6-2 locomotives

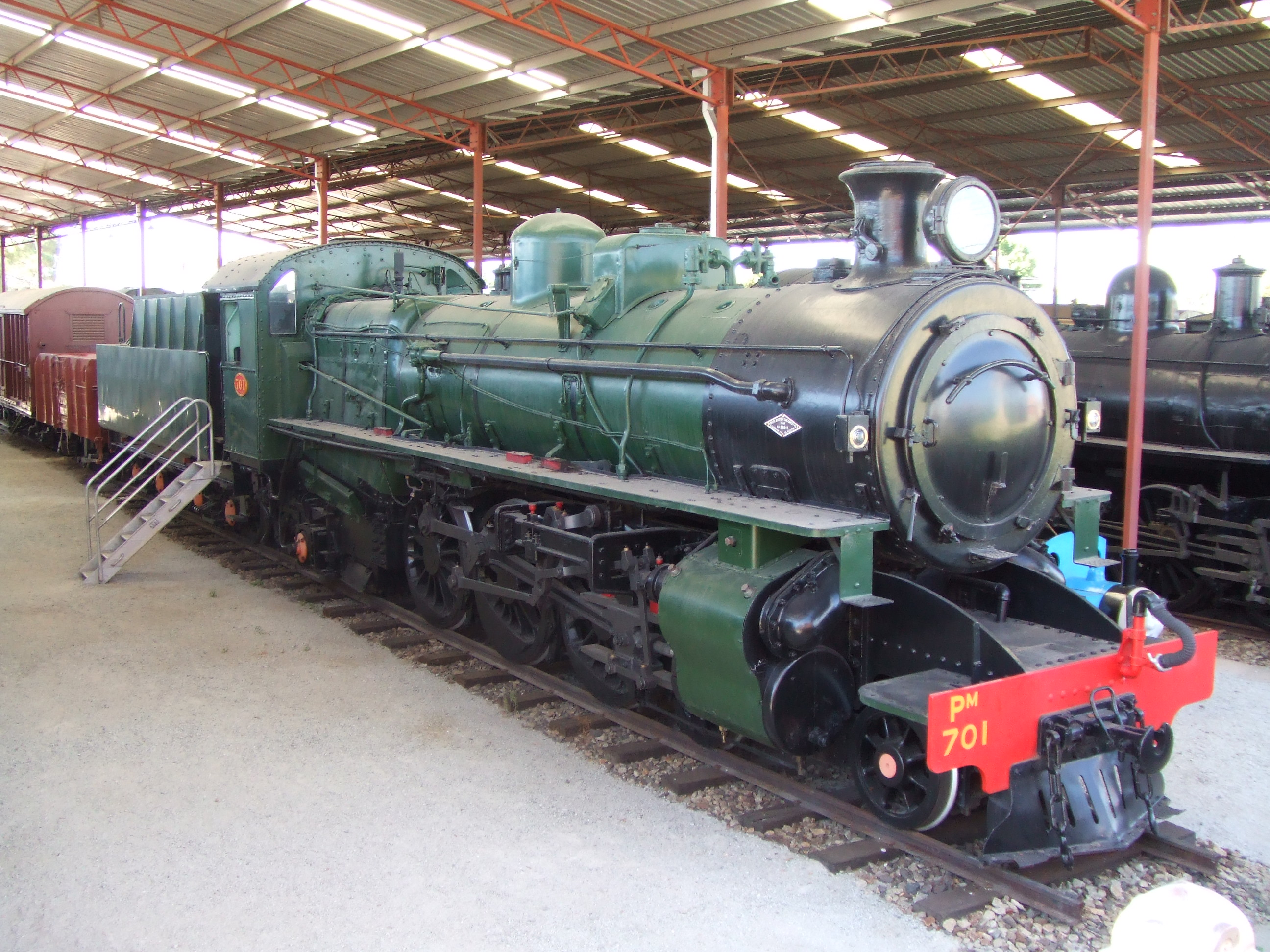
- Pm701 at the Western Australian Rail Transport Museum
Type and origin
- Power type: Steam
- Builder: North British Locomotive Company
- Serial number: 26545-26569, 26921-26930
- Build date: 1949-1950
- Total produced: 35 (Pm: 19, Pmr: 16)
Specifications
- Configuration
  - Whyte: 4-6-2
- Gauge: 3 ft 6 in (1,067 mm)
- Driver dia.: 4 ft 6 in (1,372 mm)
- Length: 63 ft 7.4 in (19.39 m)
- Width: 8 ft 9.9 in (2.69 m)
- Height: 12 ft 6 in (3.81 m)
- Total weight: 109 long tons 0 cwt (244,200 lb or 110.7 t)
- Tender type: 4-axle
- Fuel type: Coal
- Water cap.: 4,000 imp gal (18,000 L; 4,800 US gal)
- Tender cap.: 8 long tons 0 cwt (17,900 lb or 8.1 t)
- Firebox
  - Grate area: 35 sq ft (3.3 m^{2})
- Boiler pressure: 175 lbf/in^{2} (1.21 MPa)
- Cylinder size: 19 in × 26 in (483 mm × 660 mm)
- Valve gear: Walschaerts
Performance figures
- Tractive effort: 25,855 lbf (115.01 kN)
- Factor of adh.: 3.6
Career
- Operators: Western Australian Government Railways
- Numbers: Pm701-Pm714, Pm716-Pm719, Pmr715, Pmr720-Pmr735
- First run: 4 January 1950
- Withdrawn: 1970-1972
- Preserved: Pm701, Pm706, Pmr720, Pmr721, Pmr729, Pmr735
- Disposition: 6 preserved, 29 scrapped

The WAGR Pm and Pmr classes were two classes of 4-6-2 tender engine steam locomotives operated by the Western Australian Government Railways (WAGR) between 1950 and the early 1970s.

== History ==
With the WAGR suffering from a shortage of locomotives and having a backlog of repairs deferred from World War II, authorisation was granted for the construction of 35 4-6-2 locomotives. Initially it was planned that Midland Railway Workshops build 10 with the balance built externally. However capacity constraints at Midland saw the order for the full 35 placed with the North British Locomotive Company, Glasgow.

Nineteen were built as the Pm class with plain bearings on the coupled axles and roller bearings on the carrying axles. The other sixteen were built as the Pmr class with roller bearings on all axles. One Pm was later converted to a Pmr at Midland Railway Workshops.

All entered service in 1950. Although intended to operate passenger services, their independently sprung driving wheels gave a rough ride meaning they could not maintain schedules, hence they were quickly relegated to fast freight trains on the Eastern Goldfields and Great Southern lines and associated branches. Later they were concentrated on the Great Southern and South Western lines. All were withdrawn between 1970 and 1972.

== Classes list ==
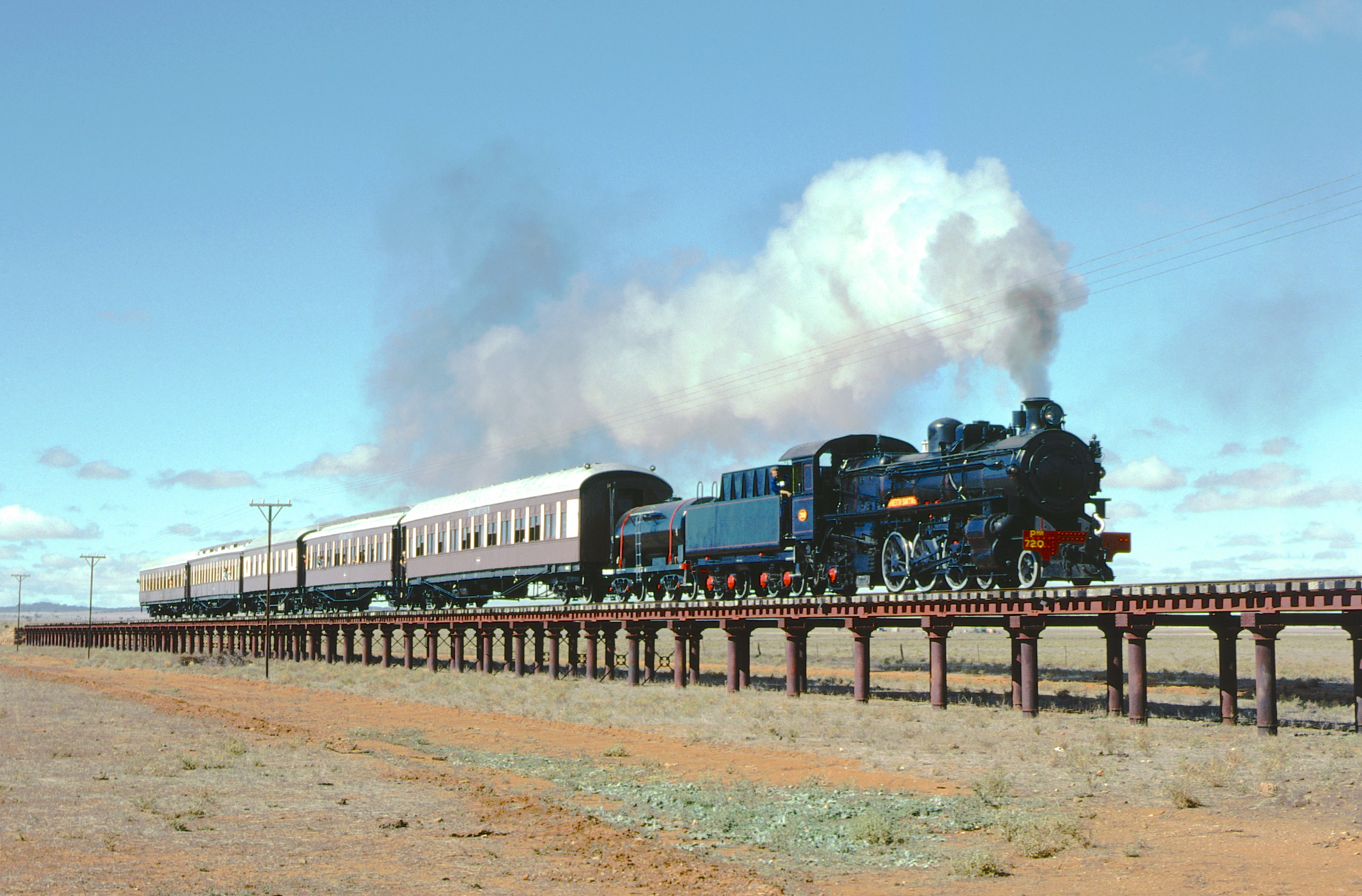
Pmr class locomotive no. 720 was the flagship of the Steamtown Peterborough Railway Preservation Society in the Mid North of South Australia. In May 1984, on an excursion trip, it traversed the iron floodway bridge 2 km south of Black Rock.

The numbers and periods in service of each member of the Pm and Pmr classes were as follows:

Builder's number	Class	Road number	In service	Withdrawn	Notes
26545	Pm	701	4 January 1950	17 June 1971	Preserved at the Western Australian Rail Transport Museum
26546	Pm	702	7 February 1950	14 August 1972	
26547	Pm	703	16 February 1950	10 September 1970	
26548	Pm	704	23 February 1950	14 August 1972	
26549	Pm	705	2 March 1950	14 August 1972	
26550	Pm	706	7 March 1950	17 June 1971	Preserved by Narrogin Apex Club / Hotham Valley Railway
26551	Pm	707	15 March 1950	10 September 1970	
26552	Pm	708	19 April 1950	14 August 1972	
26553	Pm	709	24 April 1950	10 September 1970	
26554	Pm	710	27 July 1950	17 June 1971	
26555	Pm	711	23 June 1950	14 August 1972	
26556	Pm	712	15 September 1950	14 August 1972	
26557	Pm	713	28 September 1950	14 August 1972	
26558	Pm	714	9 October 1950	14 August 1972	
26559	Pmr	715	15 November 1950	14 August 1972	Built as Pmr class
26560	Pm	716	26 September 1950	14 August 1972	
26561	Pm	717	16 August 1950	10 September 1970	
26562	Pm	718	10 May 1950	14 August 1972	
26563	Pm	719	9 May 1950	10 September 1970	
26564	Pmr	720	29 June 1950	14 August 1972	Preserved at Steamtown Heritage Rail Centre, named Keith Smith previously operational
26565	Pmr	721	24 July 1950	14 August 1972	Preserved at Northam railway station
26566	Pmr	722	20 June 1950	14 August 1972	
26567	Pmr	723	11 July 1950	14 August 1972	Fitted with Pr class dome cover, December 1967
26568	Pmr	724	29 June 1950	17 June 1971	
26569	Pmr	725	5 July 1950	14 August 1972	
26921	Pmr	726	5 July 1950	17 June 1971	
26922	Pmr	727	8 July 1950	14 August 1972	
26923	Pmr	728	19 July 1950	14 August 1972	
26924	Pmr	729	27 July 1950	10 September 1970	Preserved at Coolgardie station
26925	Pmr	730	4 August 1950	17 June 1971	
26926	Pmr	731	8 August 1950	10 September 1970	
26927	Pmr	732	18 August 1950	17 June 1971	
26928	Pmr	733	6 September 1950	10 September 1970	Built as Pm, converted to Pmr 14 October 1955
26929	Pmr	734	6 September 1950	14 August 1972	
26930	Pmr	735	31 August 1950	14 August 1972	Sold to TVW displayed at Bennett Brook Railway 1984-87, resold to Hotham Valley Railway, stored at Meelon

== See also ==
- Rail transport in Western Australia
- List of Western Australian locomotive classes
