= Steamtown Peterborough Railway Preservation Society =

Defunct railway preservation group

Steamtown Peterborough Railway Preservation Society Inc.
- Established: 1977
- Dissolved: 2005
- Location: Peterborough, South Australia
- Coordinates: 32°58′31″S 138°49′35″E
- Type: Former operating heritage railway

The Steamtown Peterborough Railway Preservation Society Inc. (known colloquially as Steamtown and Steamtown Peterborough) was a not-for-profit incorporated society that operated a heritage steam railway from Peterborough, South Australia, north along a section of the Peterborough to Quorn railway line, between 1977 and 2002. The society based its operations on the former South Australian Railways roundhouse at Peterborough and purpose-built sheds and yard at Peterborough West.

Peterborough is on the East-west rail corridor connecting Sydney and Perth. The society's formation reflected the fact that before the 1881 narrow-gauge route was rebuilt as a standard gauge line in 1970, it was South Australia's busiest regional railway hub – venue of the headquarters of the Northern Division of the South Australian Railways, regional train control, and railway workshops and maintenance facilities employing more than 1,000 people to look after more than 100 passing trains a day. After 1970, however, the scale of railway operations progressively reduced as the functions undertaken at Peterborough were moved elsewhere. The society operated for 25 years – in its peak year running 27 scheduled passenger trains – but under-capitalisation, the progressive departure of skilled tradespeople from the town and a dramatic increase in insurance costs brought about its end.

The Steamtown Heritage Rail Centre, developed by the Peterborough District Council since 2002 as a static-display museum in the former roundhouse and workshops, has utilised the locomotives and rolling stock previously owned by the society, becoming a significant tourist attraction. Its award-winning sound and light show tells the story of South Australia's early railways and presents a reminder of the town's former importance as a major railway centre.

== Foundation ==
The society was founded in 1977 to run a steam-hauled tourist train service on the Peterborough–Quorn railway line narrow gauge railway between Peterborough and Eurelia using retired South Australian Railways T class steam locomotive, T199.

A prime motivation for the project was the return to steam – by its owners, the Pichi Richi Railway, situated 120 km (75 mi) to the north-west – of sister locomotive T186, in 1976. The newly delivered locomotive, which had received final fitting and painting at Peterborough, was a centrepiece of the highly successful Peterborough Centenary celebrations.

== Operations ==
Four years after the society's foundation, on 17 April 1981, it ran its first public train. Subsequently, an average of six trips a year were made between Peterborough and Orroroo, and Peterborough and Eurelia. The peak operating year was 1981, when the society ran a total of 27 trains, including a notable trip over the former interstate narrow-gauge route to Quorn. In subsequent years it ran up to eleven scheduled trains per year. However, operations had to be briefly suspended on occasions during the late 1980s and 1990s, mainly because of unavailability of a serviceable locomotive.

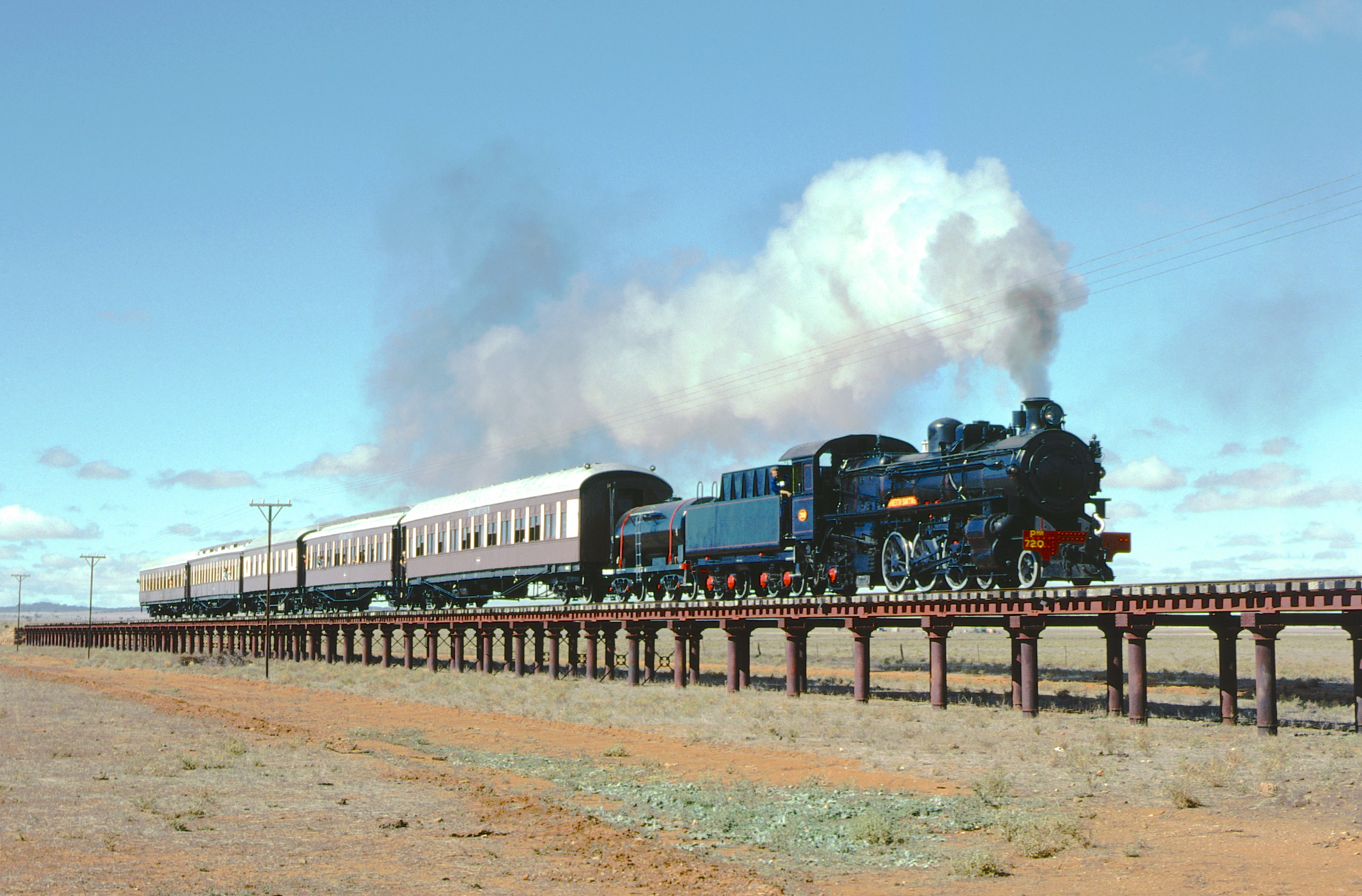
When the technical expertise needed for steam operation was readily available in Peterborough among current and former railway employees, the society ran many excursions. In May 1984, locomotive Pmr720 hauled glistening ex-Commonwealth Railways cars across the floodway bridge 2 km south of Black Rock

The society sent trains to Bruce, Hammond, Moockra and Carrieton, using hired NT class diesel locomotives, to recover track and civil infrastructure. Much of the recovered material was used within the depot at Peterborough West.

The first organised motor section car excursions in Australia were hosted between 1994 and 1998, with entertainment including a live band at Eurelia on one occasion. In the society's last years of operation, it made a restored South Australian Railways motor inspection car available for hire. A hand powered section car ("Kalamazoo") race held at Black Rock yard in 2010 was the last event on the abandoned line.

== Rolling stock ==
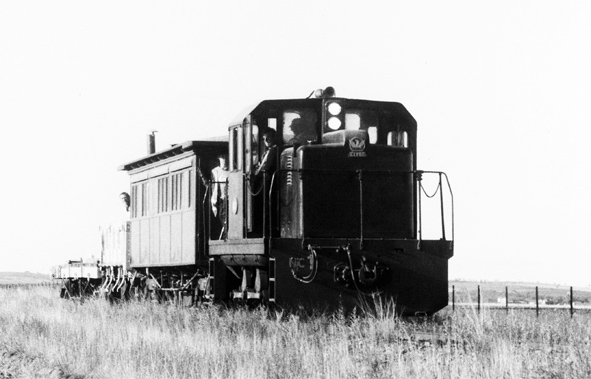
Former Commonwealth Railways NC class diesel-hydraulic locomotive NC1 on a society work train

The society's revenue passenger cars were former Commonwealth Railways stock from the narrow-gauge Central Australia Railway between Marree and Alice Springs. Its steam locomotives were from the Western Australian Government Railways, including Pmr720, and W901 and W907 (the latter was never steamed).

Diesel power was initially from Western Australia: former Commonwealth Railways NC1, which had been in the Lakewood Firewood Company's service, and Western Australian Government Railways Z1151. The society then obtained Commonwealth Railways NSU class locomotives 55 and 62 from those remaining at Marree.

Early trains were hauled by Pmr720. However, the locomotive's boiler tubes failed in the late 1980s, leaving W901 as the only operational steam locomotive. Although plans were made to recommission Pmr720, they never eventuated.

W901 experienced problems in later years through minimal maintenance and limited expertise of remaining volunteers. Some trains then became diesel-hauled or supported by small diesel power. Following the last train, W901's boiler was left full of water, causing concern about its possibly being affected by oxygen in the water. Former society members, including those involved with the recommissioning, undertook minor works in 2006 to minimise further deterioration. The locomotive became a static exhibit at the Steamtown Heritage Rail Centre in the Peterborough roundhouse.

Diesel locomotive NSU55 was eventually recommissioned during 1998 after a considerable effort by a small band of volunteers. Track conditions throughout the roundhouse and on the mainline posed significant problems for its operation, however, and concern about potential derailments led to its being operated only within the vicinity of Peterborough.

Although T199 was the first locomotive to be obtained (on loan from the Corporation of Peterborough), and was described as being in sound condition albeit with a rusted tender, it was never steamed – in part because roadworthy locomotives became available in Western Australia, including the W and Pmr class. In the end, W901, W907 and Pmr720 were purchased and shipped to Peterborough.

A steam locomotive last deployed by the South Australian Railways as a shunter at Peterborough, Y82, was never transferred to the society. It was given a cosmetic restoration in 1999, and was moved to a plinth in the town.

== Facilities ==
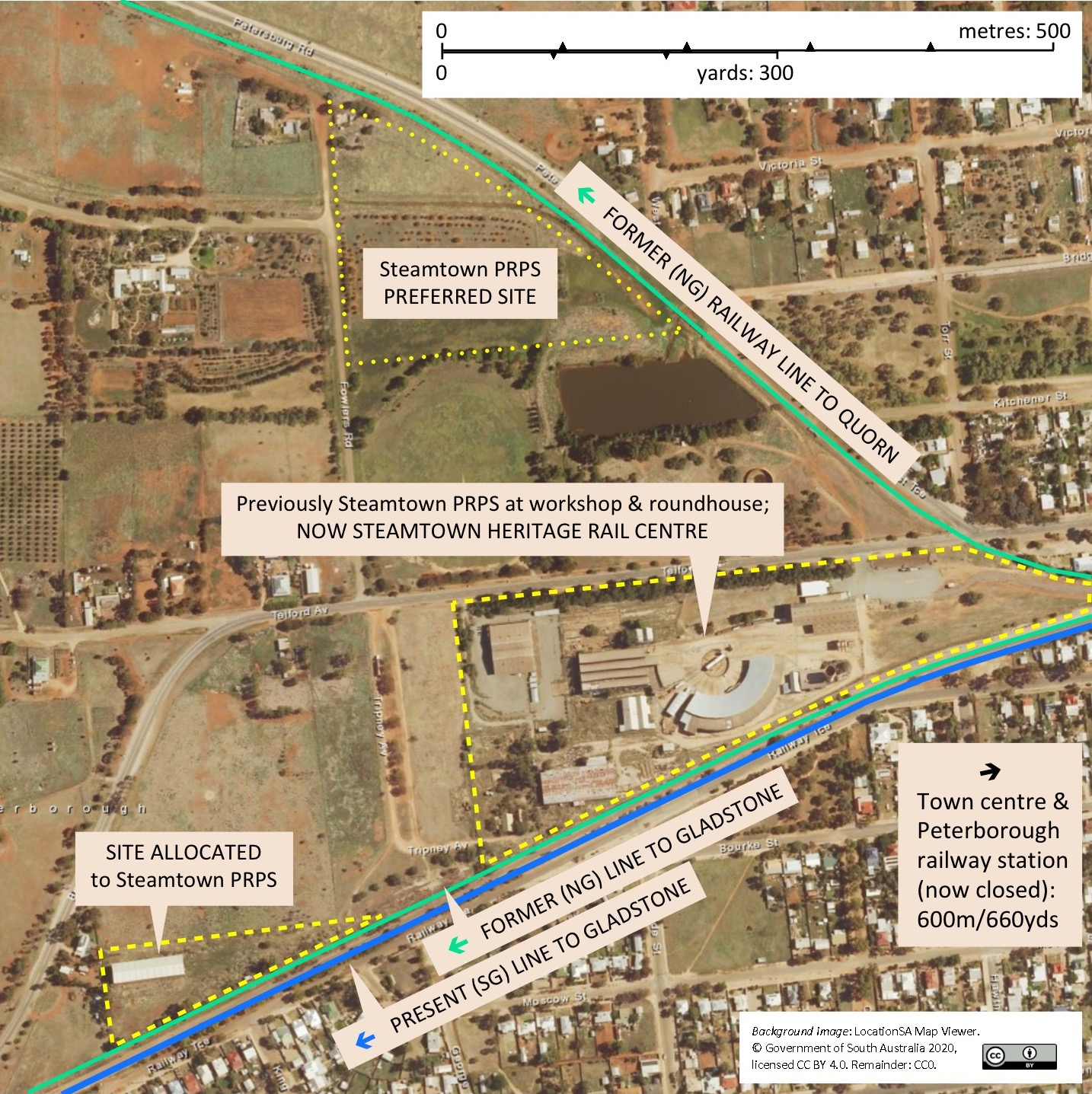
The Steamtown Peterborough Railway Preservation Society's sites. The Peterborough Council's Steamtown Heritage Rail Centre has been at the roundhouse and workshops since 2002.

The depot built by the society at Peterborough West; trackwork was recovered from abandoned sidings

In the early days of the society, Australian National, which managed the railway facilities and operations at Peterborough, allowed rolling stock to be stored within its 19-stall roundhouse. The society saw the need to establish its own facilities, and proposed to establish its own depot on a block of land 200 m (220 yards) north of the boundary of the railways site holding the workshops and roundhouse. (Note: Bordered by the Quorn line, Main Street, and the railway dam 32.972°S 138.824°E.) Members saw it as an ideal site, since it had mains water, power and sewerage. The society also proposed that a triangle could be installed, and Australian National agreed to provide the land at a nominal rent. Despite the proposal, it was not approved and a greenfield site 600 metres (660 yards) west of the roundhouse was allocated by the council. (Note: 32.9778°S 138.8207°E.) Construction of a depot started in 1980. The substantial task of laying track to connect the depot to existing track was completed in 1983.

The society operated from its depot for several years but moved most of its operational rolling stock into the roundhouse and diesel shop after Australian National withdrew its operations from the town.

== Consideration of a move ==
In the early 1980s some members realised that the future of the society was limited in Peterborough and investigated options for relocating. Low levels of tourist traffic in Peterborough and limited support from the local community were key factors, but the society had also suffered a severe loss of skilled volunteers as railway staffing in the town was drawn down. (Note: The severity of population decline after Peterborough lost its role as a major railway operations centre is reflected in the town's population – 3023 in 1971, when the South Australian Railways employed more than 1,000 people, and 1497 in the 2016 census.) Options considered were the Gladstone to Wilmington line, also of 1067 mm (3 ft 6 in) gauge, and at the time still carrying large quantities of grain; and the abandoned 1600 mm (5 ft 3 in) gauge line through the Clare Valley tourist area. In the event, the society remained in Peterborough.

== Ownership transferred ==
In 1986, following a Parliamentary Select Committee report, the South Australian Parliament passed the Steamtown Peterborough (Vesting of Property) Act, which authorised the transfer of ownership of the society's rolling stock and other assets to the Corporation of Peterborough. Members encountered great difficulty in continuing operations, however, since by then the majority of active volunteers came from outside the district and those with the skills needed to enable operations were in short supply.

== Alternatives considered ==
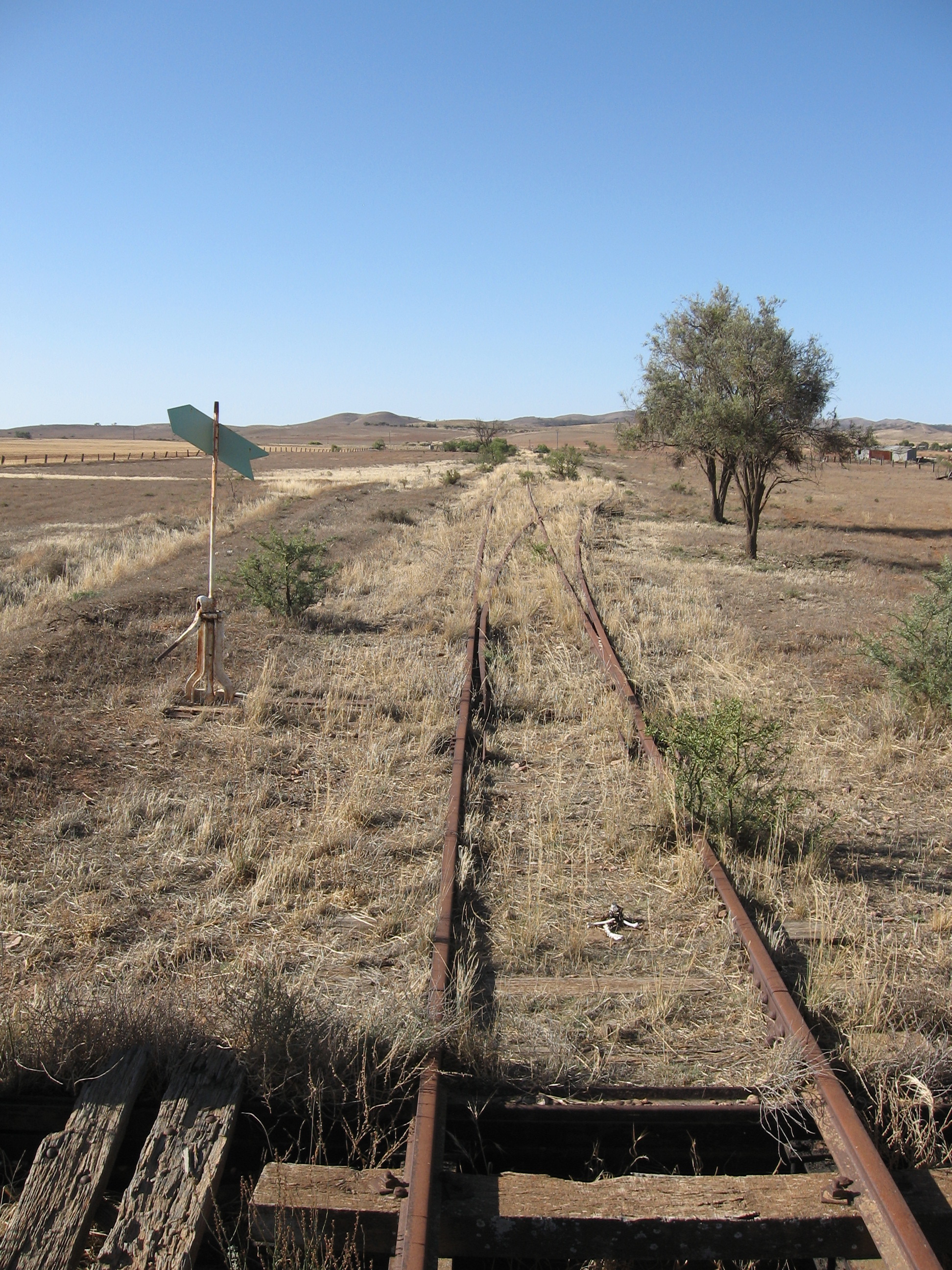
In the society's heyday, excursions ran through Walloway (pictured in 2006) to Eurelia.

By 2002, insurance costs skyrocketed for most heritage railways, leading to several ceasing operations. The society stopped running its trains when its public liability cover expired in June of that year. By the time the insurance crisis had been mitigated the following year, the society was experiencing great difficulty attracting people to a management committee.

In 2002, a steering committee was established comprising representatives of the Federation of North East Councils, the Northern Regional Development Board, the Flinders Ranges Area Consultative Committee and the society. A project followed to evaluate development of the workshops precinct as the Steamtown Heritage Rail Centre.

=== Decision to disband ===
At a special general meeting on 26 October 2003, 175 people supported a motion to dissolve the society and nine voted against. It was reported that during the previous two years, the society has suffered several upheavals and that the October 2001 annual general meeting had been declared invalid at a special general meeting in January 2002. Further, the October 2002 AGM had been unable to elect a secretary or treasurer; the president had resigned in 2003. In response to a request for help from the Steamtown committee, an administrative sub-committee formed under the Local Government Act, with representatives of the council, SA Government and the society, would "manage the troubled society's affairs".

It had been expected that with the council managing Steamtown's assets through the sub-committee, the society would be free to concentrate on operating rail trips. However, those ambitions were unfulfilled on account of soaring public liability insurance premiums. Efforts were concentrated on developing the site as a static museum, which was reported at the meeting as "proving highly successful, and has increased Steamtown's cash flow".

=== Community meeting ===
A year later, on 8 October 2004, the Peterborough District Council convened a public meeting to hear about and decide on a future direction for Steamtown. It was attended by more than 60 people. The mayor said the object of the evening was "to find out what – if any – community support existed for the further council development of Steamtown". She stated, "Council has already invested $199,000 in Steamtown, of which $83,000 was grant funding", and added that if the decision was taken to sell off the assets, Peterborough would lose a wonderful community asset. "Contrary to rumour, council is not hell-bent on closing Steamtown. It is realistic to say that trains are never likely to run again, due to issues such as track maintenance, insurance, lack of volunteers and money to do what other railway societies are doing."

The meeting heard that rolling stock and civil assets of the society had received only limited maintenance, mainly as a consequence of lack of resources. The track, last re-sleepered by the SAR in the late 1960s and early 1970s, was also deteriorating: "facts were presented showing that since the 1970s, the society had seriously underspent in maintenance on track infrastructure". It would have to be brought to a satisfactory standard before the trains could run again; but engineers' reports had shown that a $2.4 million track upgrade and annual spending of $155,000 on track maintenance would need to be spent. For the tourist attraction to reach a break-even figure, three trains a week, filled to capacity would be required – a difficult target given its limited market base. The mayor urged community members to make their feelings known to the council.

== Static museum and son et lumière ==
Steamtown Peterborough Railway Preservation Society Inc. was dissolved as an incorporated entity on 13 January 2005; its Australian Business Number was cancelled on 31 December 2004.

Rails on the line used by the society were removed at the end of 2008 with the exception of those at Pekina Creek, Black Rock yard, Black Rock bridge, Walloway yard to Walloway Creek, and in the Orroroo yard. Sales of the rail, together with some funds from the council, contributed to enhancements of the roundhouse complex, including development of a striking "sound and light show" at the Steamtown Heritage Rail Centre, managed by the council.
