= Commonwealth Railways NC class =

Australian diesel-hydraulic locomotives (1956–1980s)

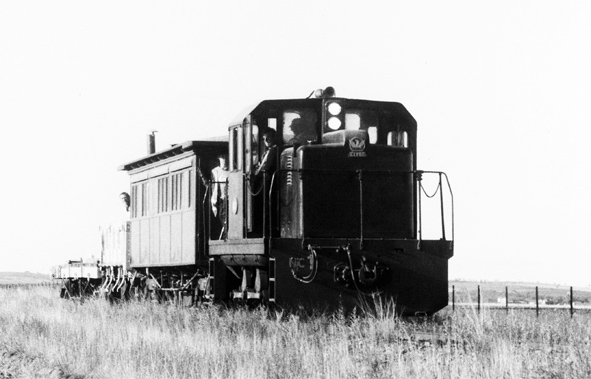
- A decade after retirement from revenue service, NC1 was used for work train duties by the Steamtown Peterborough Railway Preservation Society, here near Orroroo in 1996
Type and origin
- Power type: Diesel-hydraulic
- Builder: Clyde Engineering, Granville
- Serial number: 56-94 & 56-95
- Model: DH1-110
- Build date: 1956
Specifications
- Gauge: 1,067 mm (3 ft 6 in)
- Length: 7.67 m (25 ft 2 in)
- Fuel type: Diesel
- Prime mover: General Motors 6/110
- Engine type: Two-stroke diesel
- Cylinders: 6
Career
- Operators: Commonwealth Railways
- Number in class: 2
- Numbers: NC1-NC2
- First run: 1956

The Commonwealth Railways NC class consisted of two diesel-hydraulic locomotives built by Clyde Engineering, Granville, New South Wales in 1956. The Lakewood Firewood Company, Kalgoorlie was the first owner; the Commonwealth Railways purchased them in 1965. They ceased revenue service in the early 1980s.

== Description ==
Clyde Engineering advertised the DH series as a general purpose locomotive, mainly for light railways and sugar cane service. The design allowed for multiple unit operation, the installation of dynamic brakes and a combination of air and vacuum braking systems.

A single General Motors 6/110 two stroke diesel engine provided power through an Allison CRT5630 hydraulic transmission to mechanically coupled wheels. Cabs contained two control consoles, both facing the same direction. Maximum design speed was 60 km/h (37 mph).

== History ==
The Lakewood Firewood Company (LFC) provided timber to the various mines in the "Golden Mile" region of Kalgoorlie, Western Australia. Its operations extended to the south and east of Kalgoorlie. This area covered from Kalgoorlie to Lake Lefroy and the Eyre Highway.

At the time of ordering, the LFC were using an ageing fleet of small steam locomotives. By the time the locomotives were delivered, the company was experiencing a rapid decline in demand for wood as mines closed or switched power sources and traffic had fallen from two trains a day to two trains a week. The locomotives' introduction led to the end of steam operations on the railway. They were unpopular with crews, although a commentator has observed, "only because they were diehard steam men". By 1962, the company employed fewer than 50 people, a far cry from the 550 at its peak. The last train ran in December 1964 to clean up infrastructure. All rolling stock, except the two diesels, were scrapped.

Commonwealth Railways purchased the two locomotives in 1965. LFC1, renumbered NC1, spent time in Port Augusta workshops, where the braking systems were modified for a Westinghouse system. In November 1966 the locomotive was shipped north to Darwin, where it was employed as yard shunter on the North Australia Railway. It returned south in 1972.

NC2 was used as yard shunter in Port Augusta until 1970, when NB30 returned from removing infrastructure from the Hawker–Brachina section of the Central Australia Railway. In 1972, NC1 replaced NB30 as Port Augusta yard shunter; NC2 became a source of spare parts.

In July 1975, both were included in the transfer of the Commonwealth Railways to Australian National.

By 1982, NC1 had become more or less obsolete. The need to maintain a narrow gauge yard shunter at Port Augusta had diminished with the closure of the Central Australia Railway in 1980. In July 1982, NC2 was sold to the Pichi Richi Railway, and in 1985, NC1 was transferred to the Steamtown Peterborough Railway Preservation Society.

== Preservation ==
=== NC1 ===
NC1 remained in Port Augusta until 1985. Australian National was having to handle increasing quantities of Mereenie crude oil and approached Steamtown Peterborough Railway Preservation Society to gauge the availability of tank cars that the society had collected at Peterborough. Following the exchange of the tank cars for NC1, the locomotive arrived in Peterborough in April 1985.

NC1 went on to be the society's indispensable locomotive. It hauled passenger trains when steam was not available, ran work trains on the line, and provided back up power and braking capacity to passenger trains.

While assisting with the recovery of the society's steam locomotive W901, which had derailed in Eurelia yard in early 1988, the NC1's rear drive assembly seized up. The major repair was completed by mid-1991.

Steamtown initially painted the locomotive in the "invisible green" scheme (predominantly black with a hint of hawthorn green) associated with the South Australian Railways Peterborough Division, but in 1998 it was repainted in Commonwealth Railways maroon-and-silver livery. As of 2020 the locomotive was displayed at Steamtown Heritage Rail Centre in Peterborough.

=== NC2 ===
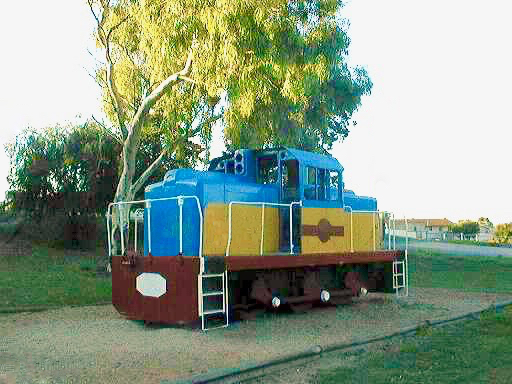
NC2 in Hermitage Park, Port Lincoln, in 2001

In July 1982, NC2 was railed to Stirling North and transferred to the Pichi Richi Railway, Quorn. There it was stripped of its motor and other mechanical devices and made safer for children to play on. It was repainted in LFC colours and in November 1982 was trucked to Port Lincoln to replace steam locomotive Yx141 as a playground fixture in Hermitage Park. During 2008, the Port Lincoln Council undertook work to enclose the cab and tidy the body shell for safety purposes. As of 2020, NC2 remained in the park.

== Livery ==
- LFC - green cab, cream sides, red headstocks; "LFC" in cream on red roundel on cab sides
- CR - maroon and silver; "Commonwealth Railways" on side of cab
- Steamtown – "invisible green" (black with green paint added) then CR maroon and silver

== Locomotives ==
Locomotive	Entered service	Owner	Status
LFC1 - NC1	1956	District Council of Peterborough	On static display at Steamtown Heritage Rail Centre
LFC2 - NC2	1956	City of Port Lincoln	On static display at Hermitage Park, Port Lincoln
