= Olary Creek =

Coordinates: 32°38′S 140°50′E

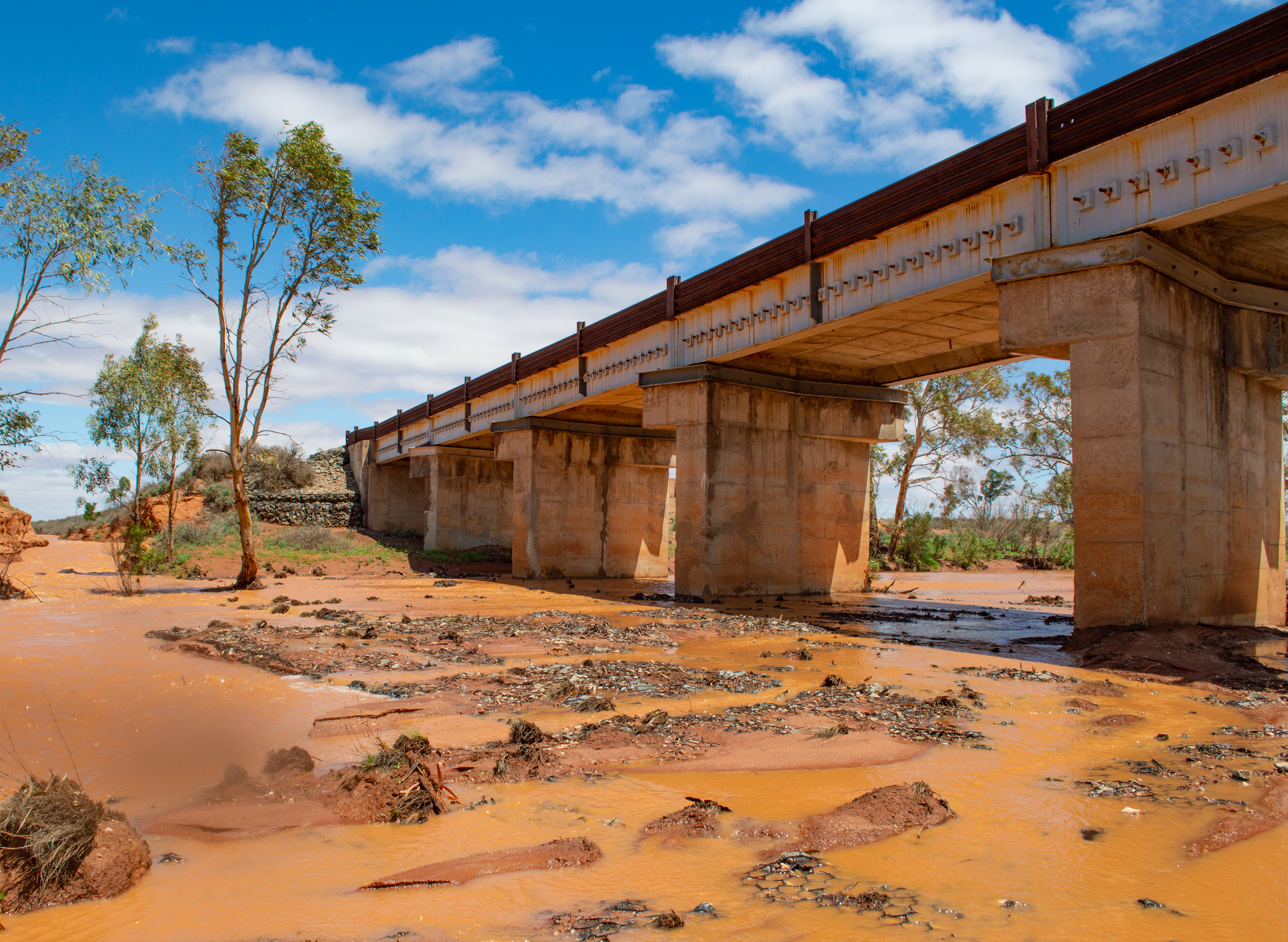
- Olary Creek in Flow, October 2020

- Location within South Australia

Location
- Country: Australia
- State: South Australia
- Region: Mid North

Physical characteristics
- Mouth: Murray Darling Basin
- Length: 110 km (68 mi)

Basin features
- River system: Murray Darling Basin

Olary Creek is an ephemeral watercourse in the Mid North region of South Australia. It lies 110 kilometres (68 mi) west of Broken Hill and 400 kilometres (250 mi) northeast of Adelaide. It has an overall length of 110 kilometres (68 mi). Blackfellows Creek, Wiawera Creek and Gall Well Creek flow into Olary Creek. The Barrier Highway and the Crystal Brook to Broken Hill railway line also cross the creek. The creek flows generally eastwards before heading south towards the Murray Darling Basin where it spreads out and is absorbed into the surrounding floodplain. It runs through the small rural locality of Olary.
