= Radium Hill =

Former mine in South Australia

Radium Hill, South Australia
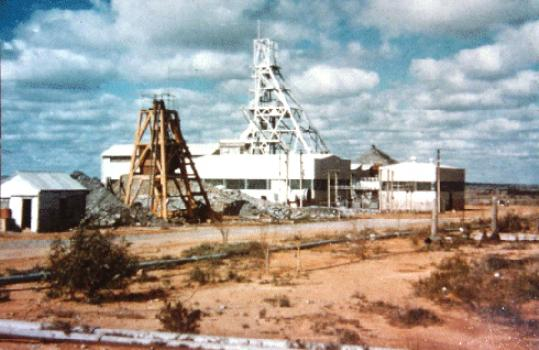
- Radium Hill minesite c.1954

- Location in Australia
- Location: 460 km North East of Adelaide and 110 km South West of Broken Hill, South Australia, Australia; 32°20′45.97″S 140°38′11.64″E
- Products: Davidite, carnotite, uranium
- Opened: 1906
- Closed: 1961
- Company: abandoned
- Acquired: first pegged 1906

Radium Hill is a former mine site in South Australia which operated from 1906 until 1961. Named by Sir Douglas Mawson, it was Australia's first uranium mine, years before the country's next major mines at Rum Jungle in the Northern Territory (opened 1950), and the Mary Kathleen mine in Queensland (1958). During its main period of production between 1954 and 1961, the mine produced nearly 1 million tonnes of davidite-bearing ore, to produce about 860 tons of U_{3}O_{8}.

The associated settlement which once housed up to 1,100 people is now a ghost town, largely abandoned and demolished.

== History ==
The site, located on Maldorky Station on the Barrier Highway east of Olary, was first pegged for mining in 1906 after prospector Arthur John Smith inadvertently discovered a radioactive material at a location approximately 40 kilometres (25 mi) east-south-east of Olary. Smith mistook the dark-coloured ore he found for tin oxide or wolfram (tungsten). His samples were sent to the University of Adelaide where young Sydney geologist and future Antarctic explorer, Douglas Mawson, found that the ore contained radium and uranium. It also had traces of ilmenite, rutile, magnetite, hematite, pyrite, chalcopyrite intergrown with quartz and biotite, chromium, vanadium, and molybdenum.

Mawson named the uranium-bearing mineral davidite after his mentor, the geologist and fellow Antarctic explorer, Sir Edgeworth David. The mine was initially called "Smith's Carnotite Mine" (carnotite being a similar uranium-bearing mineral) but, in September 1906, Mawson proposed the name "Radium Hill". Smith worked the mine for the next two years before allowing the lease to lapse. Adjoining leases stretched for 5 kilometres (3.1 mi) along the lode, with one being half-owned by Mawson.

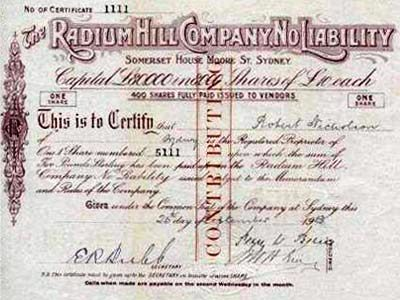
Share certificate dated 1913 issued by the Radium Hill Company

The Radium Hill Company took over the lease in 1908 and more shafts were sunk.

Ore concentrate was transferred to refineries in New South Wales and Victoria. Radium had reached a price of £13,000 per gram in 1911, (Note: Radium was discovered in 1898 by Marie Curie and she extracted the first pure metallic form of the element in 1908.) and in the same year, at a cost of £15,000, the company built a refinery at Hunters Hill in New South Wales to produce radium compounds. Around 350 milligrams of radium bromide (RaBr_{2}) and 150 kg of uranium were produced. The radium bromide was used for research in the emerging fields of radiation and radioactivity, and some of the radium refined at Hunters Hill was sold to pioneering nuclear researchers Ernest Rutherford and Marie Curie.

In May 1913, an article in The Advertiser proudly stated that "one ounce of it is equal to one hundred thousand nominal horsepower, and that small quantity would be sufficient to drive or propel three of the largest battle ships afloat for a period of two thousand years; ...It will mean that foreign nations will be obliged to seek from us the power wherewith to heat and light their cities, and find means of defence and offence..".

Mining ceased in 1914 and the Hunters Hill refinery closed the following year.

The mine's second phase of operations began in 1923, when it was operated by the Radium and Rare Earth Treatment Company N.L., which continued operations there until 1931. The company built a treatment plant at Dry Creek near Adelaide to produce radium bromide for medical applications from the Radium Hill ore. However, that proved to be uneconomic and both sites had ceased operations by 1932.

Activity recommenced after World War II. A Department of Mines geological survey in 1944 was followed by exploration and drilling work in 1946–1947. The first buildings in the new township were constructed in 1949. During a visit to the United States by Premier Sir Thomas Playford and Director of Mines S.B. Dickinson in August 1951, Playford undertook negotiations and, in March 1952, the Commonwealth and the South Australian governments and the Combined Development Agency, a joint US-UK authority tasked with ensuring the supply of uranium for the Western allies' weapons programs, signed a cost-plus contract to supply uranium for seven years. The state government operated the mine and installed the infrastructure needed to support the operation. In 1954, an 18-kilometre (11 mi) branch line was built to connect the site to the main Broken Hill railway at Cutana Siding. Full-scale mining and processing was under way by that year, and the growing workforce led to expansion of the township. By the end of the 1950s, there were houses, churches, schools, swimming pools, entertainment venues, and a cemetery. An aerodrome was constructed and roads improved in the same period. In 1961, a population of 867 was recorded.

A section of Maldorkey Station was annexed and proclaimed a "Uranium mining reserve" in 1954 and the mine was officially opened by the Governor General of Australia, Field Marshal Sir William Slim on 10 November of the same year.

The Rum Jungle, Northern Territory mine in the Northern Territory opened in 1950 and, in 1958, the Mary Kathleen mine was opened in Queensland.

The main shaft of the Radium Hill mine was 420 metres (1,380 ft) deep with a 40 metres (130 ft) headframe. Ore was crushed at a ball mill and treated on site at a surface concentrate mill using a heavy media separation and flotation process. It was then freighted by rail to the purpose-built Port Pirie Uranium Treatment Complex at Port Pirie, which processed ore from both Radium Hill and Myponga (Wild Dog Hill), south of Adelaide. The Port Pirie complex was also operated by the state government.

The mine output was 970,000 tonnes of 0.09-0.13% ore and the ore concentrate produced a mix of about 150,000 tonnes of yellowcake which was then processed at Port Pirie, where it was subjected to hot acid leaching, producing about 860 tons of U_{3}O_{8}, worth more than £15 million. After seven years of operations, the contract was filled and the plant was officially decommissioned on 21 December 1961, being unable to compete with other sources of higher-quality elsewhere in the world. During its main period of production between 1954 and 1961, the mine produced nearly 1 million tonnes of davidite-bearing ore, to produce about 860 tons of U_{3}O_{8}.

After the closure of the mine, the township was abandoned, with many of the buildings and structures being demolished or removed.

== Site rehabilitation ==
Restoration works on the site were undertaken in 1962 and again in 1981 when the tailings impoundment was covered with about 75,000 m³ of material from four adjacent borrow pits. Backfilling of old mine openings was also undertaken.

From 1981 an area of the site was gazetted as a low-level radioactive waste repository. Approximately 16 separate consignments of waste, including contaminated soil from Thebarton in the Adelaide metropolitan area, was deposited there. The last deposit was made in 1998.

A New South Wales government study in 1979 found the incidence of cancer-related deaths by former Radium Hill workers to be four times the national average. According to the report, 59% of underground miners who had worked there for a period of two years or more had died of cancer.

The site has been inactive since 1998. The Resources Division of Minerals and Energy at the Department of Primary Industry and Resources maintains management responsibility including a radiological watch on the site.

== Heritage listing and museum ==
The former townsite and cemetery were listed on the South Australian Heritage Register on 17 May 2017. The Radium Hill Townsite includes the watertank, building remains, swimming pool, foundations, piers, street layout, and garden beds.

The mine site is closed to the public, but the Radium Hill Museum was relocated to the rear of the Steamtown Heritage Rail Centre in Peterborough.

== AMDEL ==
The expertise gained by researchers at Radium Hill was maintained, leading to the establishment of the Australian Mineral Development Laboratories (AMDEL) in 1959. AMDEL was established as a statutory body under a 1959 Act of the Parliament of South Australia. It was an "independent, non-profit contract research and technical consulting organisation serving the mineral and associated industries". Headquartered in the Adelaide suburb of Frewville, it also had officers in Victoria, Queensland, Northern Territory, Western Australia, New South Wales and the Australian Capital Territory. It was funded by Australian governments, private industry, and foreign sources. The organisation published the Amdel Bulletin and the Amdel Annual Report.

Under new legislation in 1987, AMDEL's operations were transferred to AMDEL Limited, a public company registered in South Australia. It grew as a minerals analysis company, increasing its workforce from 525 to over 1,200. In May 2008, Amdel was acquired by the French company Bureau Veritas, a global test and inspection business.

== See also ==
- Uranium mining in Australia
- Uranium mines in South Australia
