= WAGR Z class =

Australian diesel-mechanical locomotives

Western Australian Government Railways Z class
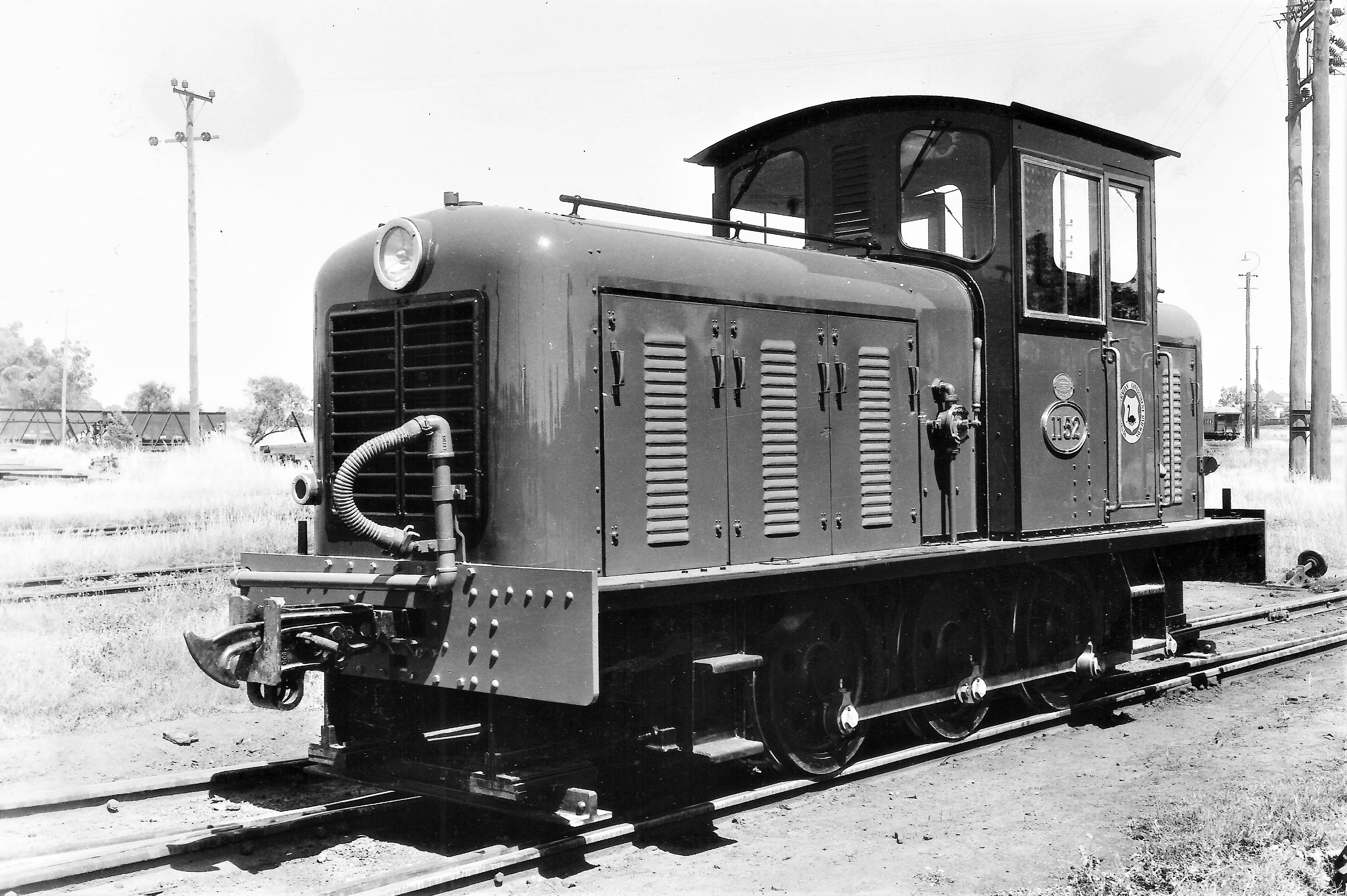
- Z1152 just after entering service on 24 November 1953
Type and origin
- Power type: Diesel-mechanical
- Builder: Robert Stephenson and Hawthorns, Newcastle upon Tyne as subcontractor to Drewry Car Co
- Serial number: Robert Stephenson and Hawthorns: 7736-7738; Drewry Car Co: 2401-2403
- Build date: 1953
- Total produced: 3
Specifications
- Configuration
  - Whyte: 0-6-0DM
  - AAR: C
  - UIC: C
- Gauge: 3 ft 6 in (1,067 mm)
- Length: 5.75 m (18 ft 10 in)
- Loco weight: 15.13 tonnes (14.89 long tons; 16.68 short tons)
- Fuel type: Diesel
- Prime mover: Gardner 8LW
- RPM range: 600-1700 rpm
- Engine type: Four-stroke Inline Eight-cylinder Water-cooled Diesel engine
- Displacement: 11.16 litres (2.45 imp gal; 2.95 US gal)
- Cylinders: 8
- Cylinder size: 4.5 in × 6 in (110 mm × 150 mm)
- Transmission: Mechanical
- Loco brake: Air brake
- Train brakes: Vacuum brake
Performance figures
- Maximum speed: 28 km/h (17 mph)
- Power output: 140 hp (100 kW)
- Tractive effort
  - Starting: 38.21 kN (8,589.95 lbf)
Career
- Operators: Western Australian Government Railways (former)
- Number in class: 3
- Numbers: Z1151, Z1152 & Z1153
- Locale: Western Australia
- First run: October 1953
- Withdrawn: January 1983
- Current owner: Steamtown Peterborough Railway Preservation Society, Hotham Valley Railway & Boulder Loopline Railway
- Disposition: All preserved

The Western Australian Government Railways (WAGR) Z class was a class consisting of three lightweight six-wheeled diesel-mechanical locomotives which were active in Western Australia from November 1953 to January 1983 and which have since been preserved.

== History ==
Ordered in 1951 by the WAGR as part of its post-war rehabilitation program, the Z class was ordered from the Drewry Car Company at a cost of £12,000 per locomotive, with their construction being subcontracted to Robert Stephenson and Hawthorn Ltd (RSH) of Newcastle, England. After the locomotives were built they were shipped from Britain to Australia, with Z1151 arriving at Fremantle harbour on 26 September 1953. Z1151 was demonstrated at the Perth Royal Show in October 1953 and entered service with the WAGR on 14 October 1953. The remaining two Z class locomotives would arrive around five weeks later. This was despite the fact that their delivery date had originally being set for September 1952.

After entering service with the WAGR they were assigned to works as shunters on the jetty's and wharfs at Busselton, Bunbury and other ports. They were capable of working for 22 hours per day, operating in three shifts, and alongside this could operate for five days on a single fuel tank.

By January 1954 the Z class were considered to have proven their worth to the WAGR. All three Z class locomotives were withdrawn from service on 1 January 1983 and subsequently were sold into preservation.

=== Preservation ===
After being withdrawn from service by the WAGR on 1 January 1983 all three Z class locomotives were sold into preservation.

The first member of the class, Z1151, would be sold to the Steamtown Peterborough Railway Preservation Society while the third, Z1153, was sold to the Boulder Loopline Railway.

The second member of the class, Z1152, would be sold to the Hotham Valley Railway (HVR) and was used by them on work trains during the rehabilitation of the Dwellingup - Etmilyn section of track throughout 1985–86. In June 2003 a request was made to the HVR by Works Infrastructure (E.D.I) to allow for the use of Z1152 to assist in the construction of the new Urban Rail Car Depot at Nowergup on the new extension of the Northern Suburbs Railway and was transferred by road to Nowergup which was not connected by rail at time of movement.

After the return of Z1152 to the HVR, the locomotive has seen use as the shunter at Pinjarra depot.

== Design ==
The Z class is a lightweight diesel locomotive, weighing in at 15.13 tonnes (14.89 long tons; 16.68 short tons), which utilizes an 0-6-0 wheel arrangement and which is powered by a Gardner 8LW four-stroke eight cylinder in-line water-cooled diesel engine rated at 140 horsepower. The Gardner 8LW uses 110 mm (4.33 in) × 150 mm (5.91 in) cylinders and has a displacement of 11.16 L (681 cu in) while producing its power in the 600-1700 RPM range.

Furthermore, the class uses a mechanical transmission, with the power being transmitted to the six driving wheels via external coupling rods. The class' braking system uses air for the locomotive and vacuum for the train. The class' maximum speed is 28 km/h (17 mph) and is capable of producing a tractive effort of 38.21 kN when starting.

== Class list ==
Number	Serial – RSH	Serial – Drewry	Status	Location
Z1151	7736	2401	Static Display	Steamtown, Peterborough, South Australia
Z1152	7737	2402	Operational	Hotham Valley Railway, Pinjarra
Z1153	7738	2403	Stored	Boulder Loopline Railway, Kalgoorlie

== Gallery ==
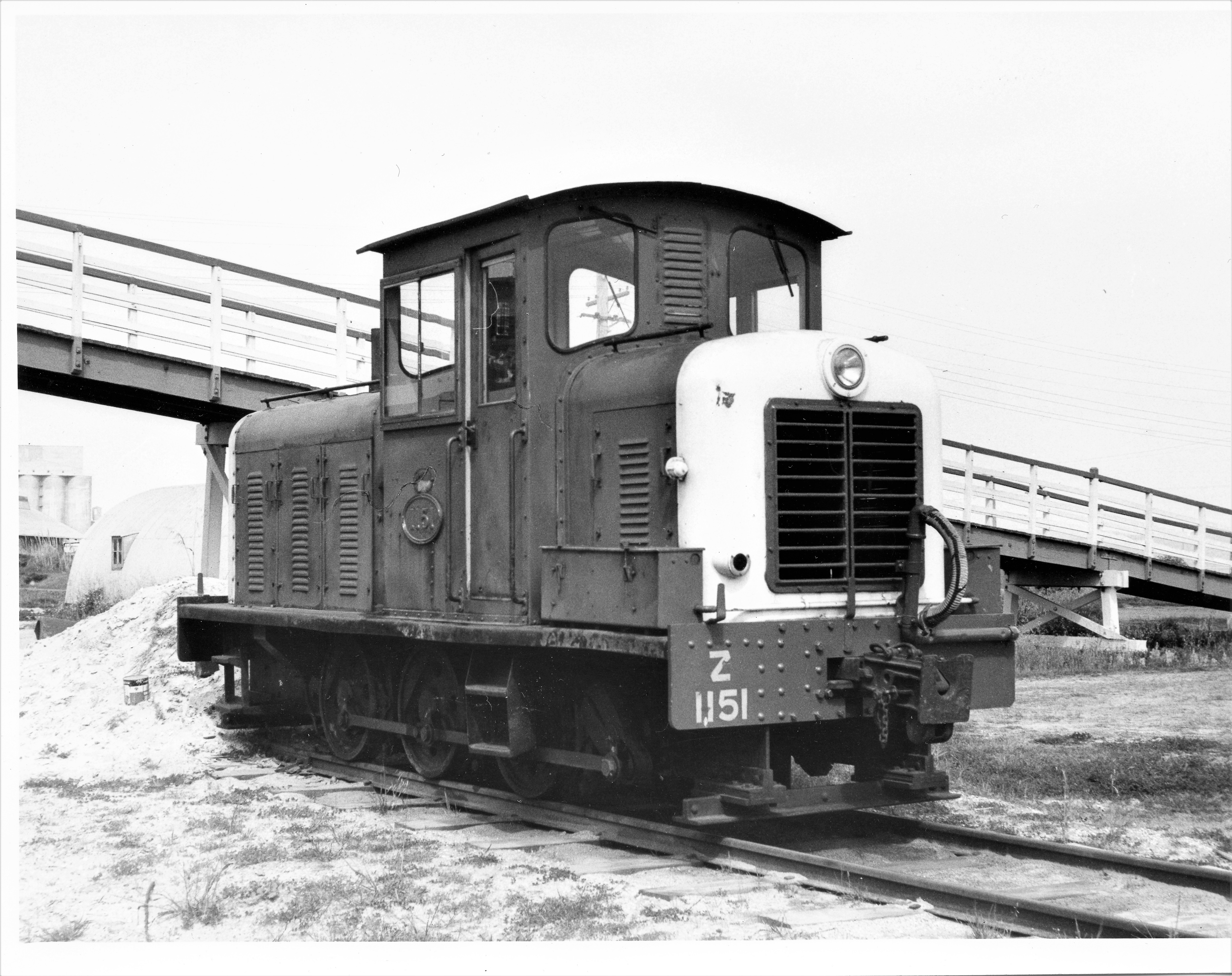
Z1151 at rest in a siding

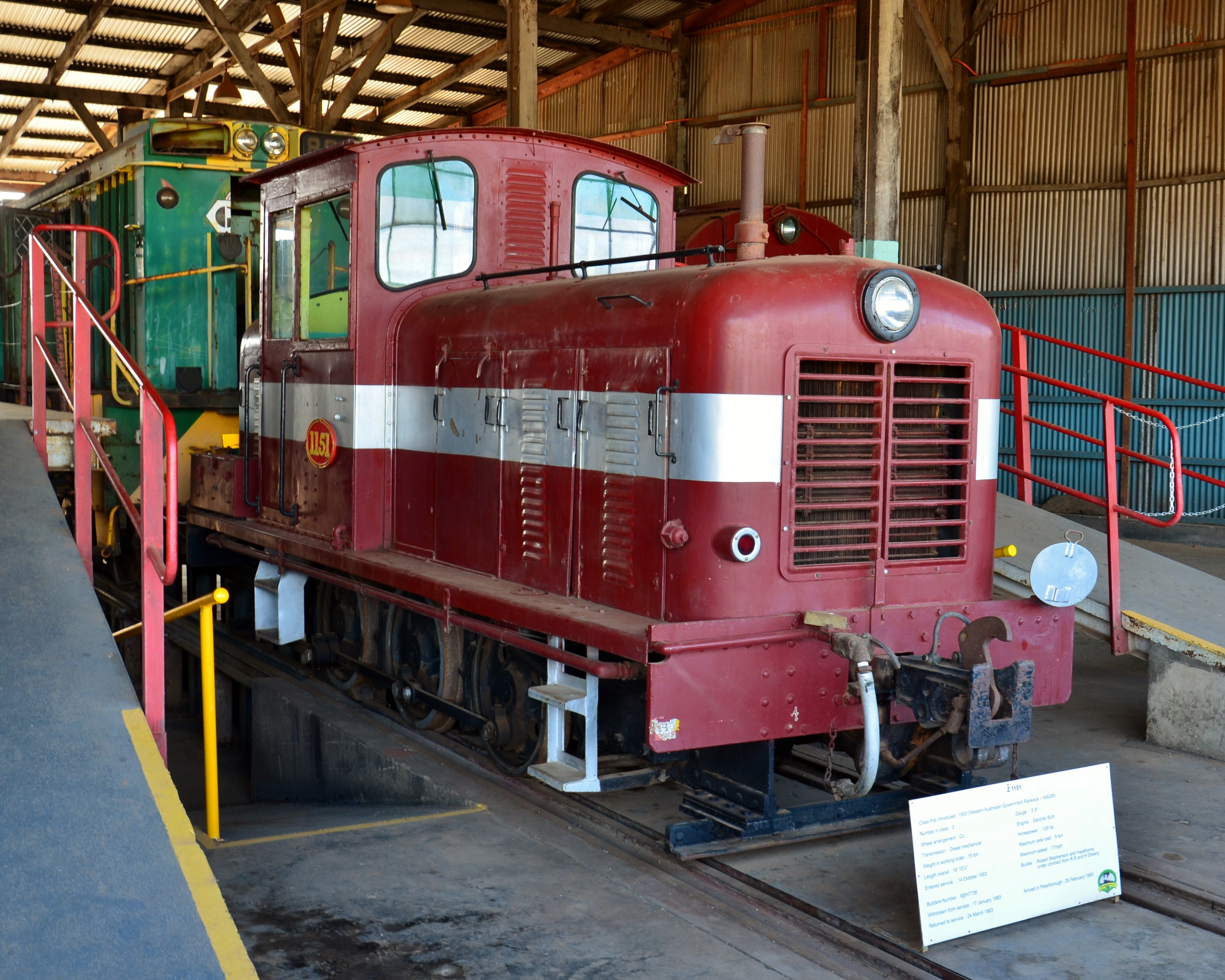
Z1151 preserved at Steamtown in a non-authentic livery, circa 2017

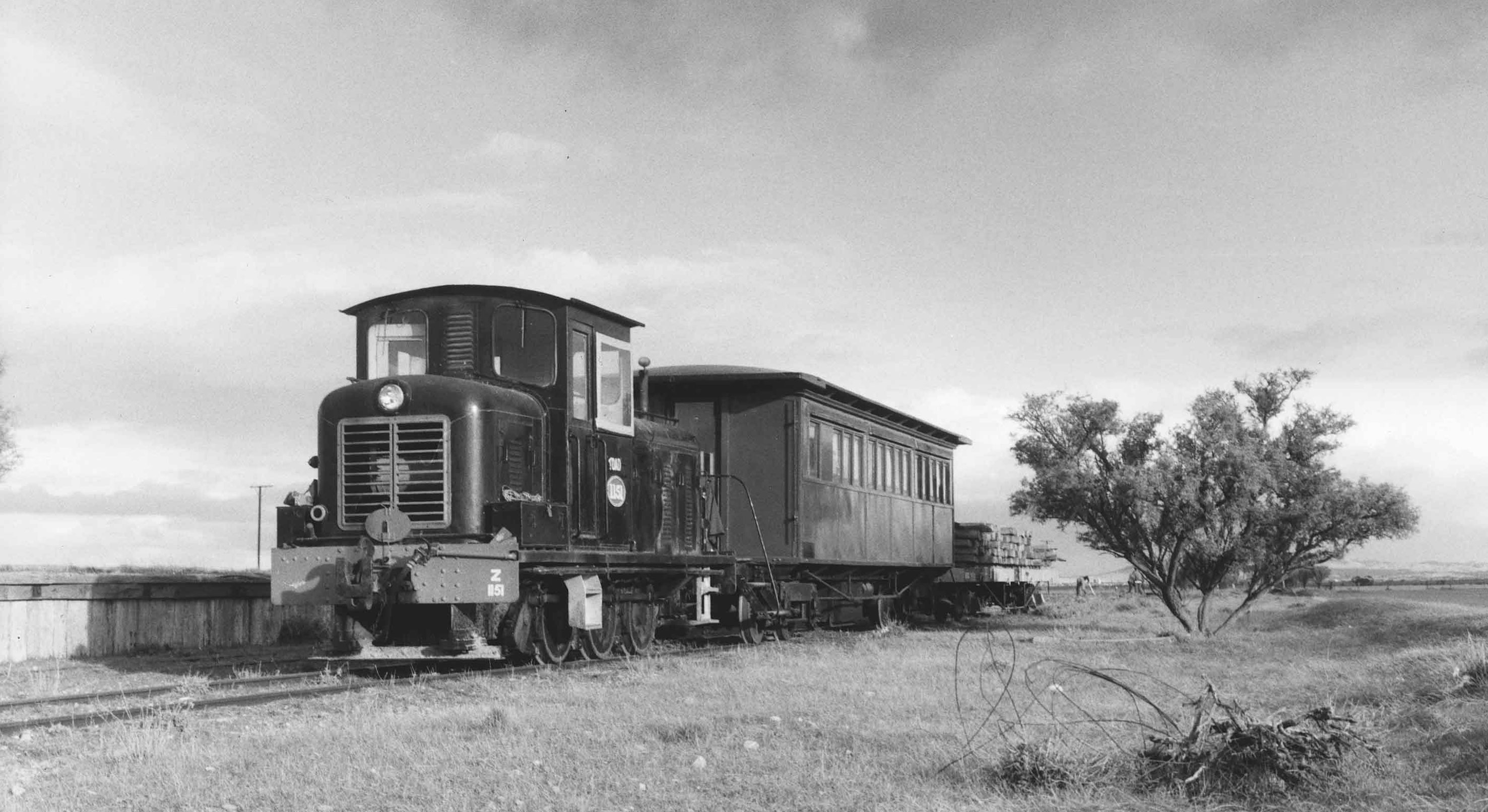
Z1151 with a small train in Walloway, South Australia, circa 1996
