= Olary, South Australia =

Olary
- Town
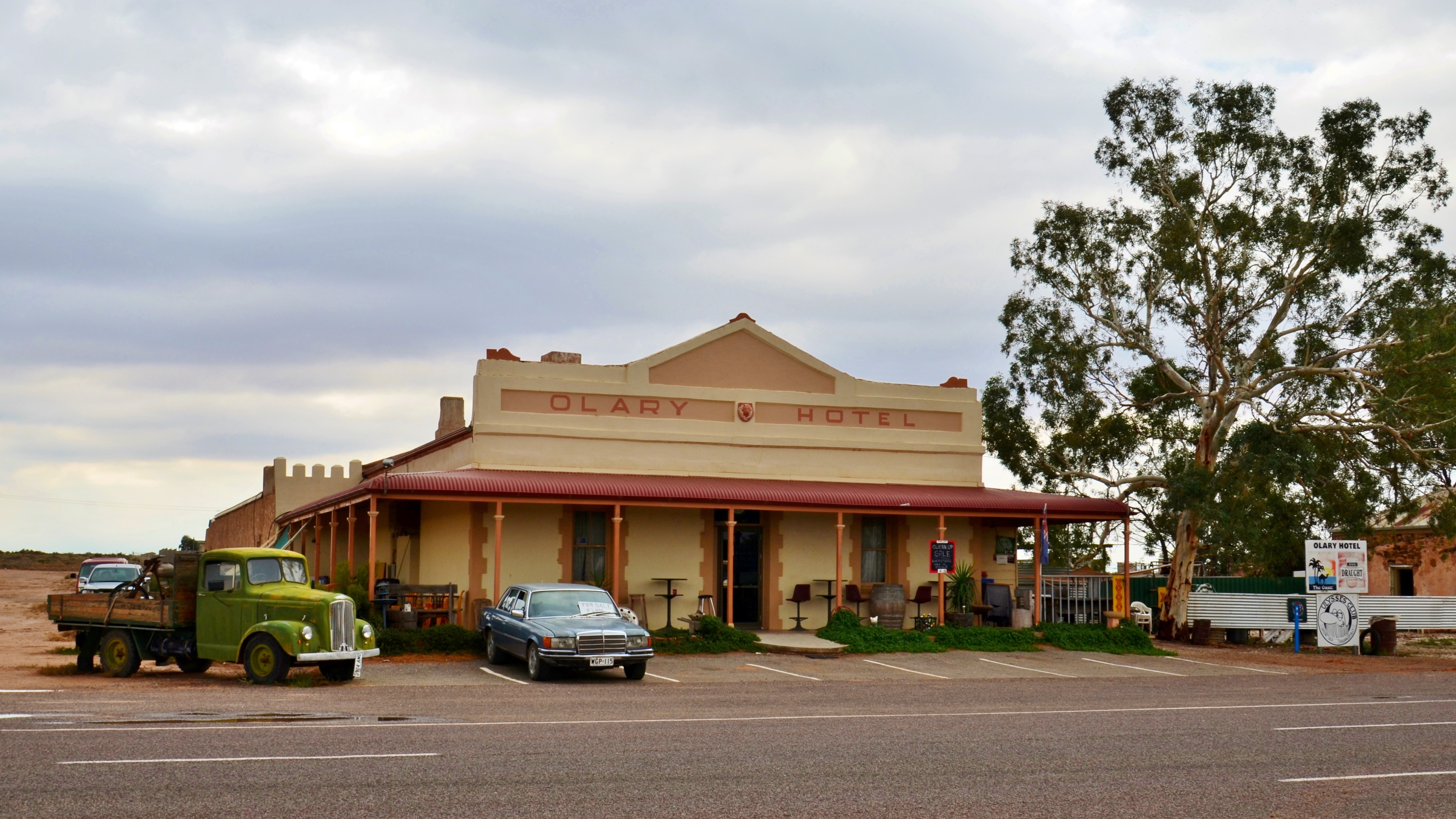
- Olary Hotel, 2017

- Coordinates: 32°16′51″S 140°19′35″E
- Country: Australia
- State: South Australia
- Region: Far North
- LGA: Pastoral Unincorporated Area
- Location: 335 km (208 mi) NNE of Adelaide; 110 km (68 mi) SW of Broken Hill
- Established: 1 December 1887 (town); 23 October 2003 (locality)

Government
  - State electorate: Stuart
  - Federal division: Grey
- Elevation: 285 m (935 ft)

Population
  - Total: 4 (SAL 2016)
- Time zone: UTC+9:30 (ACST)
  - Summer (DST): UTC+10:30 (ACST)
- Postcode: 5440
- Mean max temp: 24.7 °C (76.5 °F)
- Mean min temp: 9.5 °C (49.1 °F)
- Annual rainfall: 202.5 mm (7.97 in)
Localities around Olary
Outalpa	Abminga Station	Abminga Station
Outalpa	Olary	Abminga Station; Wiawera
Wiawera	Wiawera	Wiawera

Olary is a town and locality on the Barrier Highway in South Australia. It is situated near Olary Creek and is one of the easternmost settlements in the state. The name "Olary" was first given to a nearby well or waterhole by the pastoralists Duffield, Harrold, and Hurd.

== History ==
A small settlement was established in the late 1880s to serve the highway and the railway which passed through there. O'Lary Post Office opened on 12 October 1886, was renamed Oolarie in around 1888, and Olary in around 1896.

As motor vehicles began to be increasingly used to travel between Adelaide and Broken Hill, the population of the village declined.

In 2010, the historic Bimbowrie Cobb and Co coach house near Olary became the scene of a traditional restoration operation, with almost 20 tradespeople attending a five-day training course in stonemasonry restoration. Low-security prisoners from the Port Augusta Prison were among those who assisted with the project.

== Geography ==
The Flinders-Olary NatureLink includes the mountainous Flinders and Olary Ranges, together with the connecting plains country, and covers six percent of the state of South Australia.

== Governance ==
Olary is located within the federal division of Grey, the state electoral district of Stuart and the Pastoral Unincorporated Area of South Australia.

As of 2019, the community within Olary received municipal services from the Outback Communities Authority, a South Australian government agency.

== Nearby places of interest ==
The nearby Mount Victoria Well & Whim Historic Site is listed on the South Australian Heritage Register.

Radium Hill, located approximately 40 kilometres (25 mi) east-south-east of Olary, is the site of a uranium mine which operated from 1906 until 1961, and was the first uranium mine in Australia. In 1906, Sir Douglas Mawson discovered what he called davidite there. Named after Mawson's mentor, geologist Edgeworth David, davidite contains titanium and uranium.

== See also ==
- List of cities and towns in South Australia
