= Steamtown Heritage Rail Centre =

Coordinates: 32.9751°S 138.8261°E

Steamtown Heritage Rail Centre logo

The Steamtown Heritage Rail Centre is a railway museum located in the former South Australian Railways workshops in Peterborough, South Australia. Peterborough was the administrative and service centre for the Peterborough Division of the South Australian Railways, employing up to 1500 people during its heyday. The workshops covered an area of 11 hectares (27 acres) to the west of the township; exhibits are displayed in a former machine shop, in a 19-stall roundhouse, and on a 23 metres (75 feet) turntable.

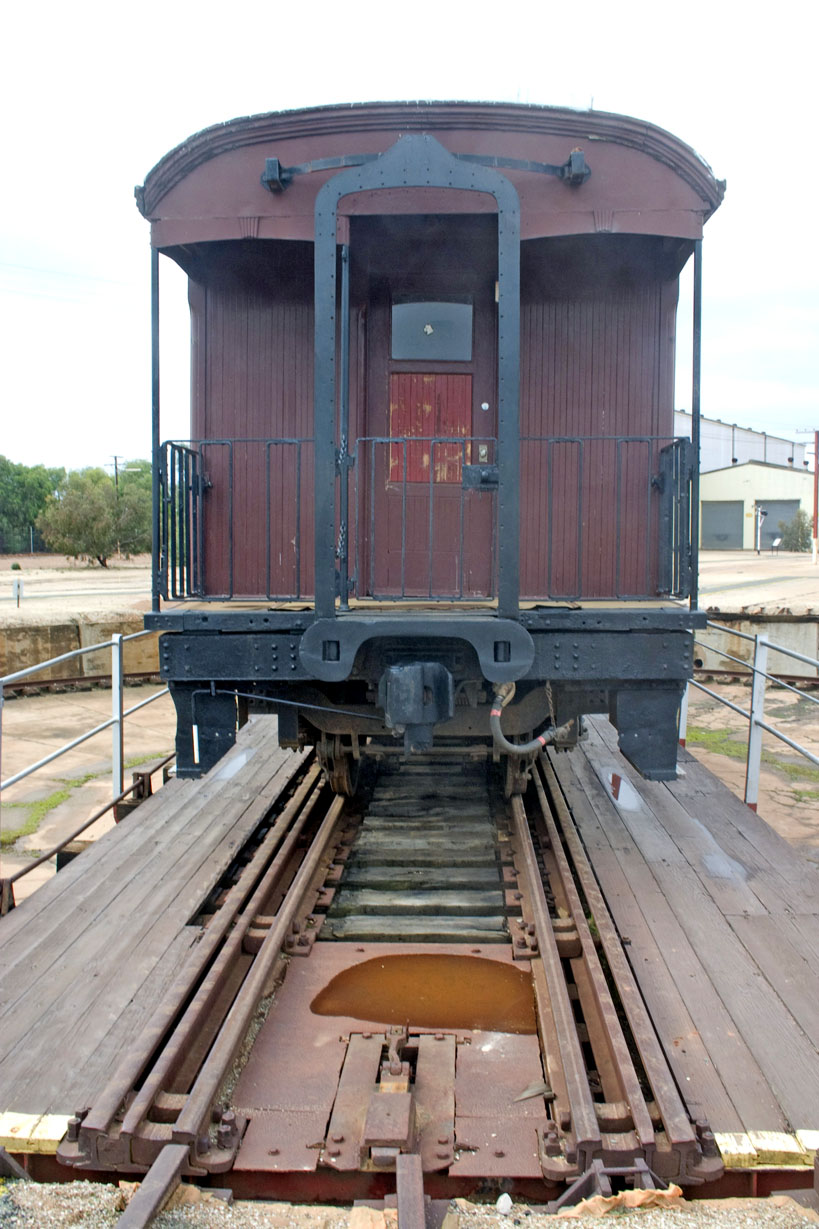
The turntable, with its three different rail gauges

== History ==
Switch using 1,067 mm (3 ft 6 in) / 1,435 mm (4 ft 8 1/2 in) track, between the roundhouse and the Peterborough West washout facilities

Before Steamtown Peterborough Railway Preservation Society's operations ceased in June 2002, some representatives of the Society, the Federation of North East Councils, the Northern Regional Development Board and the Flinders Ranges Area Consultative Committee met to formalise development of the workshops precinct. From this start, the Steamtown Heritage Rail Centre proceeded.

== Development ==
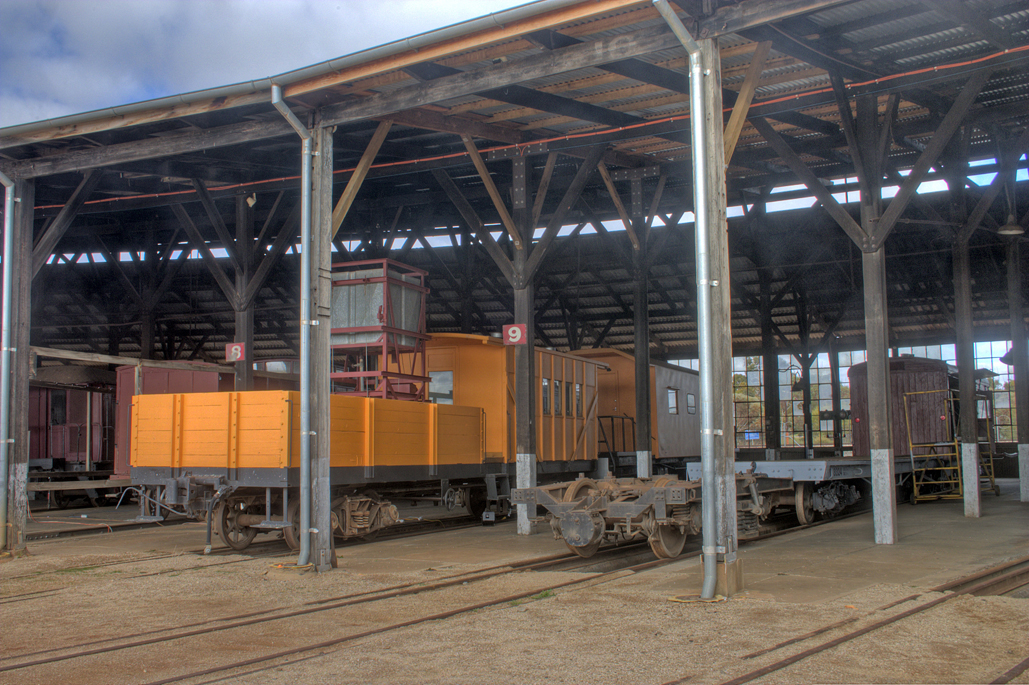
Part of the roundhose showing some of the museum's rolling stock

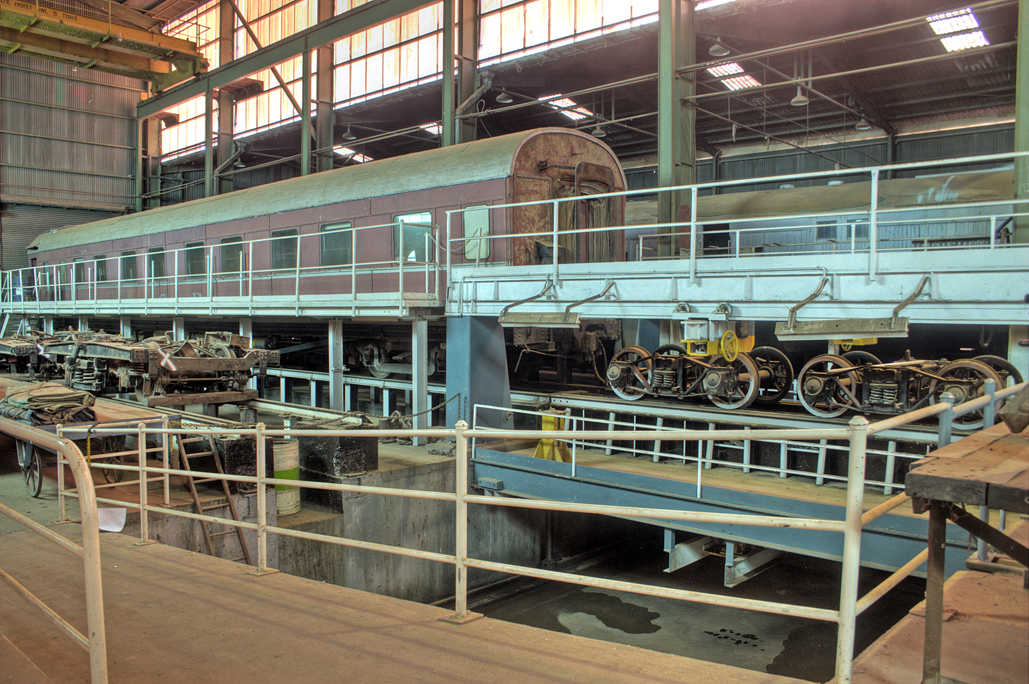
Inside the diesel shed: the bogie drop-pit

The grounds were improved and new displays, including interpretive signage, were erected. A reception centre, including offices, a souvenir shop and a café, was built off Main Street, at the north-eastern corner of the site.

The turntable is unusual in that it accommodates three rail gauges: Narrow gauge (1,067 mm or 3 ft 6 in), standard gauge (1,435 mm or 4 ft 8 1/2 in) and broad gauge (1,600 mm or 5 ft 3 in). In Australia there were only two similar turntables (located at Port Pirie and Gladstone); all three were on the same line, with the one at Peterborough the only one remaining. This unique situation arose from the standardisation project of the late 1960s. At this time the broad gauge line was extended from Terowie to Peterborough and the Port Pirie to Broken Hill section (passing through Peterborough) was replaced by standard gauge line. The Peterborough to Quorn section remained narrow gauge.

== Opening ==
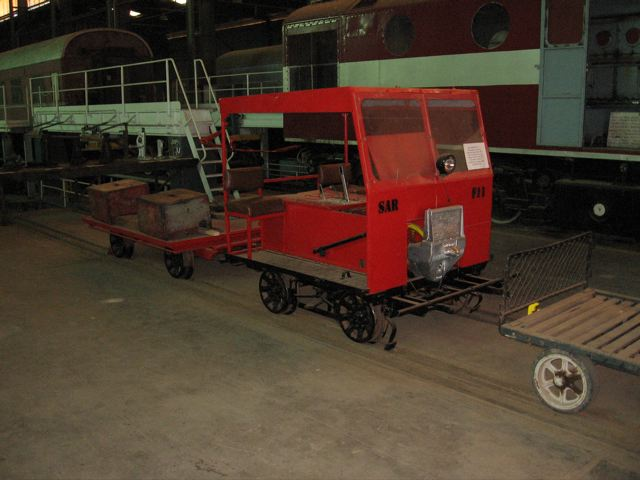
Inside the diesel shop: Fairmont section car and, behind it, NSU 55

NC1, NSU55, 863, W901, PMR720 at the SHRC night show

The Steamtown Heritage Rail Centre was officially opened on 29 November 2009.

== Services ==
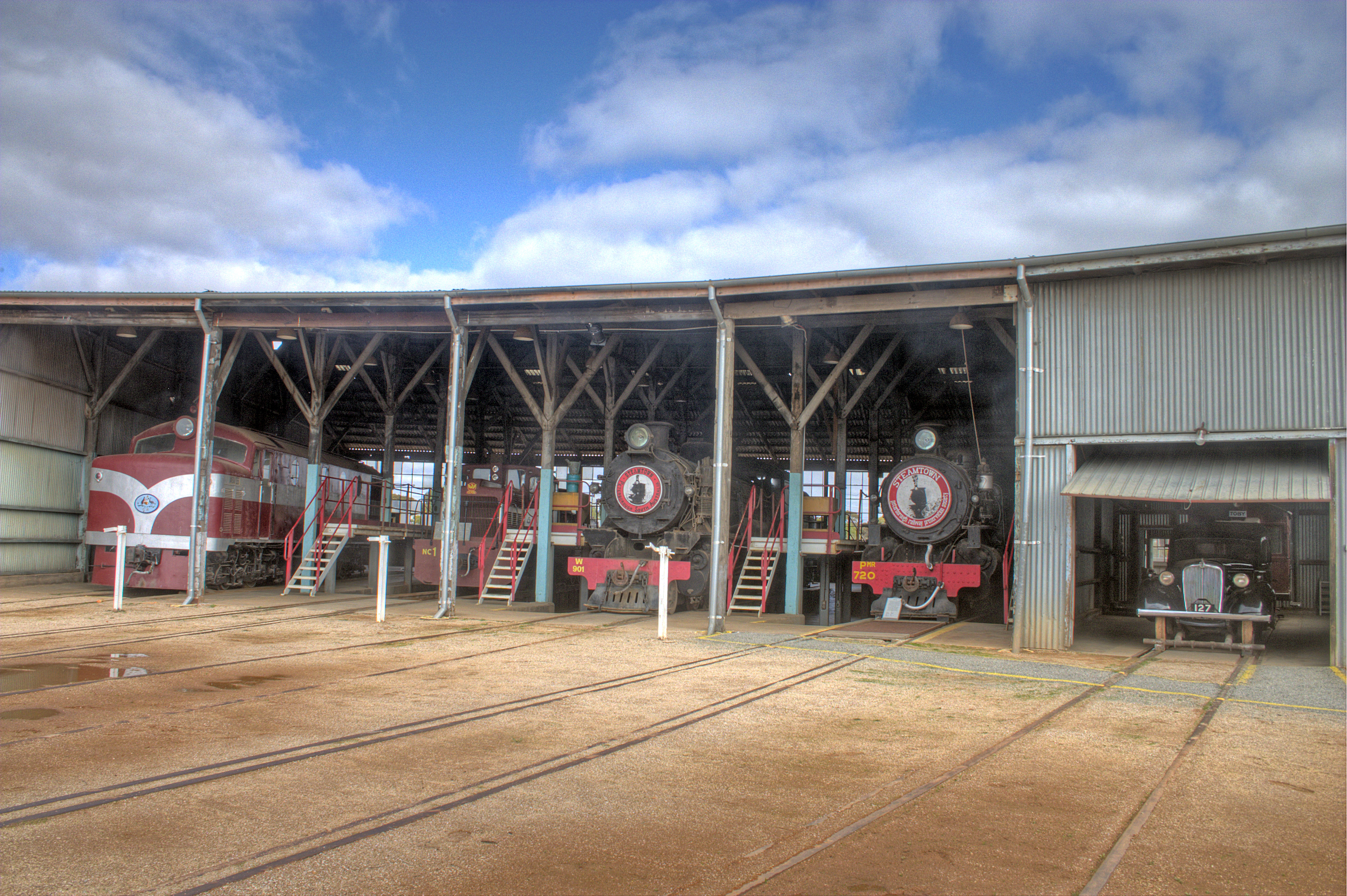
Part of the roundhouse, showing some of the locomotives on display

The centre is open seven days a week; an entry fee is charged.

Guided tours, lasting about an hour and a half, provide a narrative of the equipment displayed, the infrastructure on site and its social history as well as exploring amusing railway anecdotes and experiences.

After the centre's opening, technical difficulties limited the availability of the planned sound and light show; but after considerable work to resolve the issues the show is now considered a huge success, operating most nights, dependent only on bookings. The sound and light show has contributed to an increase in the number of overnight stays in the town, which benefits the other tourist attractions and the town in general.

The centre had accreditation as a rail-transport operator to run its motor inspection car, MIC 127, between the centre and the former goods platform in Peterborough yard, though this is rarely done.

== Operation ==
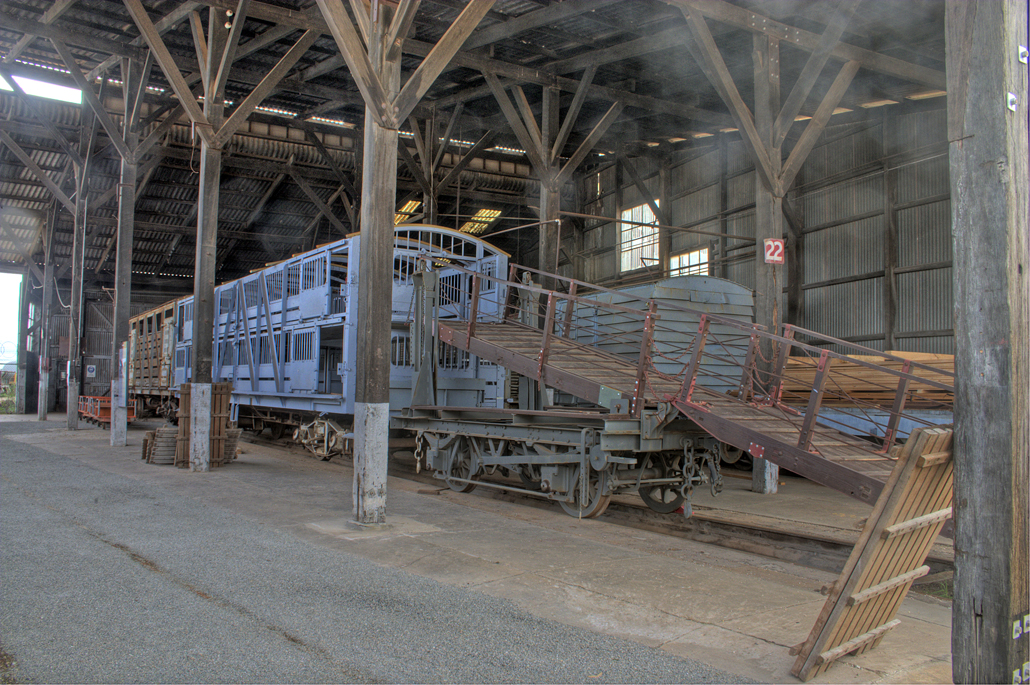
The sheep car that local high school students restored

The centre has been operated by a staff of volunteers sourced from the local community in conjunction with a paid manager and a receptionist.

1960s-vintage diesel locomotive workshop.

Through a skills-development program run in association with the local high school, students assisted with the refurbishment of a sheep wagon and a miniature train. One of these students, Ben Graefe, who also runs tours at the centre, won a Rotary Pride in Workmanship 2010 Award for his efforts.

The centre was planned to be cost-neutral to the council within seven years; however, attendances to both tours and its Sound and Light show were such that it was expected to break even within two to three years. It was expecting to achieve a visitation rate of 15,000 by the end of the 2011-2012 financial year.

As of August 2025 the Steamtown Heritage Rail Centre and Peterborough Visitor Centre are closed owing to the District Council's financial position. It is hoped that they will be reopened in time for the 2026 tourist season, under a new operating model.

=== Radium Hill Museum ===
On-site at the centre is the Radium Hill Museum, which commemorates Australia's first uranium mine, at Radium Hill (near Olary, 220 kilometres (140 miles) to the north-east of Peterborough). The mine opened in 1906 and closed in 1961. Members of the isolated though vibrant community of 37 different nationalities still meet to celebrate their experiences.

== Fleet table ==
The Steamtown fleet as of 2026 is shown in the following table:

Number	Entered service	Status	Original Owner	Livery	Gauge	Notes	Image
W901	April 1951	Static Display	WAGR	Black with red lining	NG	Was Operational	W901 & PMR720
W907	1951	Static Display	WAGR	Green with black lining	NG	Was a source of parts for W901	W907 at SHRC
PMR720	29 June 1950	Static Display	WAGR	Black with red lining	NG	Was Operational / Named "Keith Smith"	W901 & PMR720
T199	4 March 1912	Static Display	SAR	Black with red lining	NG	Was Operational	T199 at SHRC
532	1.6.1964	Static Display	SAR	Modified SAR Red and Yellow	SG	Donated in 2012 by G&W	
705	March 1972	Was Operational, suffered engine failure	SAR	G&W patch AN	SG	Donated in 2023 by G&W	705 at SHRC
863	June 28, 1963	Static Display	SAR	Cab & A end in fresh AN, B end in faded paint	NG	Donated in 2016 by G&W	863 & W901
NC1	1956	Operational / Static Display	CR	CR Maroon & Silver	NG	Used as a Shunter at Darwin, Alice Springs, and Pt Augusta	
NSU55	1955	Near Operational / Static Display	CR	CR Maroon & Silver	NG	Fitted with a Buell B3 air horn	NSU55 at SHRC
NSU62	1955	On Loan	CR	CR Maroon & Silver	NG	On loan to the Farina Restoration Group / was a source of spare parts	NSU62
Z1151	1953	Static Display	WAGR	Maroon & Silver	NG	Was able to ride the turntable with a carriage to prepare trains	

Table made by NR17 Photography

== Awards ==
October 2010 the Centre won an Advantage SA award, in the Regional Tourism category for Yorke and Mid North Region During October 2012, the Centre won an Advantage SA award, in the Regional Tourism category 2014 Steamtown won the SA Regional Award for Tourism 2015 Steamtown won the Hall of Fame Award for Tourism in the region of Yorke and Mid North
