= Davidite =

Mineral containing rare earth metals

Davidite-(La)
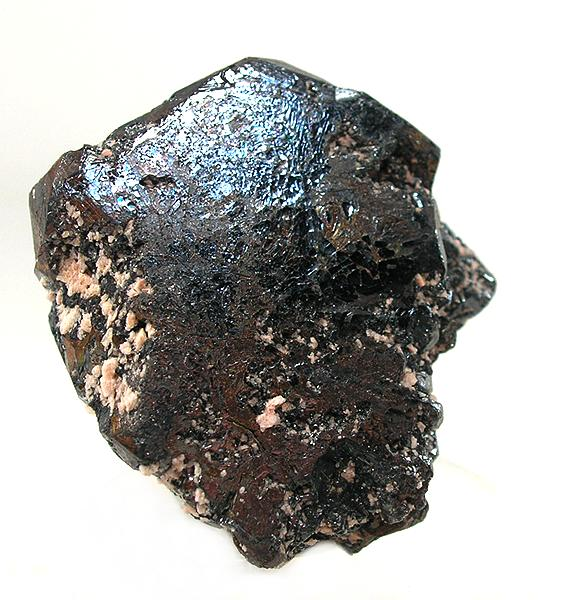
- Davidite-(La) from Kazakhstan

General
- Category: Oxide minerals
- Formula: (La,Ce,Ca)(Y,U)(Ti,Fe^{3+})_{20}O_{38}
- IMA symbol: Dvd-La
- Strunz classification: 4.CC.40
- Crystal system: Trigonal
- Crystal class: Rhombohedral (3̅); H-M symbol: (3̅)
- Space group: R3̅
- Unit cell: a = 10.376, c = 20.91 [Å]; Z = 3

Identification
- Color: Black
- Fracture: Subconchoidal to uneven
- Tenacity: Brittle
- Mohs scale hardness: 6
- Luster: Vitreous
- Diaphaneity: Opaque, translucent in very thin fragments
- Specific gravity: 4.33 to 4.48
- Alters to: Metamict
- Other characteristics: Radioactive

Davidite is a rare earth oxide mineral with chemical end members Lanthanum (La) and Cerium (Ce). It exists in two forms:

- Davidite-(La) (La,Ce,Ca)(Y,U)(Ti,Fe^{3+})_{20}O_{38} discovered at Radium Hill mine, South Australia in 1906 and named by Douglas Mawson for Australian geologist Tannatt William Edgeworth David (1858-1934).
- Davidite-(Ce) (Ce,La)(Y,U)(Ti,Fe^{3+})_{20}O_{38} first described in 1960 from Vemork, Iveland Municipality, Norway.
